= List of Major National Historical and Cultural Sites in Shanxi =

As of 2024, Shanxi Province has 531 Major Historical and Cultural Sites Protected at the National Level, ranking first among all provinces in China. Of these, 421 are ancient architectural sites, accounting for 79% of the provincial total and also ranking first nationwide. This list is part of Major Sites Protected for their Historical and Cultural Value at the National Level in the Province of Shanxi, People's Republic of China.

Site	Chinese name	Location	Designation	Image
Site of the Battle of Pingxingguan	Pingxingguan zhanyi yizhi 平型关战役遗址	39°20′44″N 113°57′34″E Lingqiu County 灵丘县	1-25	Upload file
Headquarters of the Eighth Route Army	Balujun zongsilingbu jiuzhi 八路军总司令部旧址	Wuxiang County 武乡县	1-26	Upload file
Yungang Grottoes	Yungang shiku 云冈石窟	Datong 大同市	1-34	Upload file
Fogong Temple Shijia Pagoda (Yingxian Wooden Pagoda)	Fogong si Shijia ta 佛宫寺释迦塔 (Yingxian muta 应县木塔)	39°33′55″N 113°10′55″E Ying County 应县	1-71	Upload file
Nanchan Temple Main Hall	Nanchan si dadian 南禅寺大殿	Wutai County 五台县	1-79	Upload file
Foguang Temple	Foguang si 佛光寺	38°52′09″N 113°23′16″E Wutai County 五台县	1-80	Upload file
Jinci Temple	Jinci 晋祠	Taiyuan 太原市	1-85	Upload file
Shanhua Temple	Shanhua si 善化寺	40°05′09″N 113°17′37″E Datong 大同市	1-88	Upload file
Huayan Temple	Huayan si 华严寺	Datong 大同市	1-91	Upload file
Yongle Palace	Yongle gong 永乐宫	Ruicheng County 芮城县	1-93	Upload file
Guangsheng Temple	Guangsheng si 广胜寺	Hongtong County 洪洞县	1-96	Upload file
Dingcun Site	Dingcun yizhi 丁村遗址	Xiangfen County 襄汾县	1-137	Upload file
Site of the Jin Capital in Houma	Houma Jinguo yizhi 侯马晋国遗址	Houma 侯马市	1-146	Upload file
Bethune Old Model Hospital	Baiqiu'en mofan bingshi jiuzhi 白求恩模范病室旧址	Wutai County 五台县	2-7	Upload file
Yanshan Temple	Yanshan si 岩山寺	Fanshi County 繁峙县	2-23	Upload file
Old Architecture of Wutaishan	Wutai Shan gu jianzhu qun 五台山古建筑群	Wutai County 五台县	2-26	Upload file
Hanging Temple	Xuankong si 悬空寺	39°39′57″N 113°42′18″E Hunyuan County 浑源县	2-30	Upload file
Pingyao City Walls	Pingyao chengqiang 平遥城墙	37°12′N 112°09′E Pingyao County 平遥县	3-60	Upload file
Dingcun Folk Houses	Dingcun mingzhai 丁村民宅	Xiangfen County 襄汾县	3-87	Upload file
Faxing Temple	Faxing si 法兴寺	Zhangzi County 长子县	3-106	Upload file
Tiantai Temple	Tiantai an 天台庵	Pingshun County 平顺县	3-107	Upload file
Qinglian Temple	Qinglian si 青莲寺	Zezhou County 泽州县	3-110	Upload file
Zhenguo Temple	Zhenguo si 镇国寺	37°17′06″N 112°16′44″E Pingyao County 平遥县	3-111	Upload file
Dayun Hall	Dayun yuan 大云院	Pingshun County 平顺县	3-112	Upload file
Yuhuang Temple	Yuhuang miao 玉皇庙	Zezhou County 泽州县	3-113	Upload file
Chongfu Temple	Chongfu si 崇福寺	Shuozhou 朔州市	3-117	Upload file
Shuanglin Temple	Shuanglin si 双林寺	37°10′15″N 112°07′30″E Pingyao County 平遥县	3-120	Upload file
Wanrong Dongyue Temple	Wanrong Dongyue miao 万荣东岳庙	Wanrong County 万荣县	3-129	Upload file
Xiezhou Guandi Temple	Xiezhou Guandi miao 解州关帝庙	Yuncheng 运城市	3-130	Upload file
Xihoudu Site	Xihoudu yizhi 西侯度遗址	34°41′35″N 110°16′12″E Ruicheng County 芮城县	3-182	Upload file
Taosi Site	Taosi yizhi 陶寺遗址	35°52′55″N 111°29′55″E Xiangfen County 襄汾县	3-192	Upload file
Yuwangcheng Site	Yuwangcheng yizhi 禹王城遗址	Xia County 夏县	3-205	Upload file
Pingcheng Site	Pingcheng yizhi 平城遗址	Datong 大同市	3-215	Upload file
Guangwu Han Tombs	Guangwu Han muqun 广武汉墓群	Shanyin County 山阴县	3-236	Upload file
Tomb of Sima Guang	Sima Guang mu 司马光墓	Xia County 夏县	3-246	Upload file
Xujiayao, Houjiayao Site	Xujiayao-Houjiayao yizhi 许家窑—侯家窑遗址	Yanggao County 阳高县	4-2	Upload file
Xiyincun Site	Xiyincun yizhi 西阴村遗址	Xia County 夏县	4-5	Upload file
Jingjie Site	Jingjie yizhi 旌介遗址	Lingshi County 灵石县	4-24	Upload file
Qucun-Tianma Site	Qucun-Tianma yizhi 曲村—天马遗址	Quwo County 曲沃县	4-26	Upload file
Longmen Temple	Longmen si 龙门寺	Pingshun County 平顺县	4-92	Upload file
Jincheng Erxian Temple	Jincheng Erxian miao 晋城二仙庙	Zezhou County 泽州县	4-97	Upload file
Chongqing Temple	Chongqing si 崇庆寺	Zhangzi County 长子县	4-98	Upload file
Guanwang Temple	Guanwang miao 关王庙	Yangquan 阳泉市	4-99	Upload file
Zetian Temple	Zetian miao 则天庙	Wenshui County 文水县	4-100	Upload file
North and South Jixiang Temples	Nan, Bei Jixiang si 南、北吉祥寺	Lingchuan County 陵川县	4-101	Upload file
Ji Family Estate	Ji shi minju 姬氏民居	Gaoping 高平市	4-115	Upload file
Niuwang Temple Stage	Niuwang miao xitai 牛王庙戏台	Linfen 临汾市	4-116	Upload file
Jiangzhou Hall	Jiangzhou datang 绛州大堂	Xinjiang County 新绛县	4-117	Upload file
Yuci City God Temple	Yuci chenghuangmiao 榆次城隍庙	Jinzhong 晋中市	4-118	Upload file
Huozhou Great Prefectural Hall	Huozhou zhoushu datang 霍州州署大堂	Huozhou 霍州市	4-119	Upload file
Thousand Buddha Temple	Qianfo an 千佛庵	Xi County 隰县	4-134	Upload file
Wanrong Houtu Temple	Wanrong Houtu miao 万荣后土庙	Wanrong County 万荣县	4-167	Upload file
Xianshenlou	Xianshen lou 祆神楼	Jiexiu 介休市	4-168	Upload file
Longshan Caves	Longshan shiku 龙山石窟	Taiyuan 太原市	4-192	Upload file
Site of the Government of the Shanxi-Suiyan Region and of the Military Headquarters	Jin-Sui bianqu zhengfu ji junqu silingbu jiuzhi 晋绥边区政府及军区司令部旧址	Xing County 兴县	4-241	Upload file
Site of the Headquarters of the Eighth March Army	Balujun qianfang zongbu jiuzhi 八路军前方总部旧址	Zuoquan County 左权县	4-243	Upload file
Shizitan Site	Shizitan yizhi 柿子滩遗址	Ji County 吉县	5-8	Upload file
Dongxiafeng Site	Dongxiafeng yizhi 东下冯遗址	Xia County 夏县	5-9	Upload file
Jinyang City ruins	Jinyang gucheng yizhi 晋阳古城遗址	Taiyuan 太原市	5-10	Upload file
Old Towns of Pujindu and Puzhou	Pujindu yu Puzhou gucheng yizhi 蒲津渡与蒲州故城遗址	Yongji 永济市	5-11	Upload file
Quhui Temple Stone Sculptures	Quhui si shixiang zhuan 曲回寺石像冢	Lingqiu County 灵丘县	5-12	Upload file
Mamaozhuang Tombs	Mamaozhuang muqun 马茂庄墓群	Lüliang 吕梁市	5-151	Upload file
Yonggu Mausoleum on Fangshan	Fangshan Yongguling 方山永固陵	Datong 大同市	5-152	Upload file
Macun Carved Brick Tomb	Macun zhuandiao mu 马村砖雕墓	Jishan County 稷山县	5-153	Upload file
Wanrong Jiwang Temple	Wanrong Jiwang miao 万荣稷王庙	Wanrong County 万荣县	5-224	Upload file
Datong Nine Dragon Wall	Datong jiulong bi 大同九龙壁	Datong 大同市	5-225	Upload file
Guangji Temple Main Hall	Guangji si Daxiong baodian 广济寺大雄宝殿	Wutai County 五台县	5-226	Upload file
Jiexiu Houtu Temple	Jiexiu Houtu miao 介休后土庙	Jiexiu 介休市	5-227	Upload file
Zhengjue Temple	Zhengjue si 正觉寺	Changzhi County 长治县	5-228	Upload file
Longyan Temple	Longyan si 龙岩寺	Lingchuan County 陵川县	5-229	Upload file
Jingzhuang Dayun Temple Main Hall	Jingzhuang Dayun si Daxiong baodian 荆庄大云寺大雄宝殿	Hunyuan County 浑源县	5-230	Upload file
Dou Dafu Ancestral Temple	Dou dafu ci 窦大夫祠	Taiyuan 太原市	5-231	Upload file
Guanyin Hall	Guanyin tang 观音堂	Changzhi 长治市	5-232	Upload file
Lu'an City God Temple	Lu'an fu chenghuangmiao 潞安府城隍庙	Changzhi 长治市	5-233	Upload file
Ayuwang Pagoda	Ayuwang ta 阿育王塔	39°04′49″N 112°57′18″E Dai County 代县	5-234	Upload file
Bianjing Drum Tower	Bianjing lou 边靖楼	39°03′49″N 112°56′53″E Shangguan, Dai County 代县	5-235	Upload file
Chunhua Temple	Chunhua si 淳化寺	Pingshun County 平顺县	5-236	Upload file
Minghui Dashi Pagoda	Minghui dashi ta 明惠大师塔	Pingshun County 平顺县	5-237	Upload file
Jiutian Shengmu Temple	Jiutian Shengmu miao 九天圣母庙	Pingshun County 平顺县	5-238	Upload file
Cixiang Temple	Cixiang si 慈相寺	Pingyao County 平遥县	5-239	Upload file
Pingyao Confucian Temple	Pingyao wenmiao 平遥文庙	Pingyao County 平遥县	5-240	Upload file
Xingdongyuan Dongyue Temple	Xingdongyuan Dongyue miao 兴东垣东岳庙	Shilou County 石楼县	5-241	Upload file
Dabei Temple	Dabei yuan 大悲院	Quwo County 曲沃县	5-242	Upload file
Taifu Temple	Taifu guan 太符观	Fenyang 汾阳市	5-243	Upload file
Qin County Dayun Temple	Qin xian Dayun yuan 沁县大云院	Qin County 沁县	5-244	Upload file
Jueshan Temple Pagoda	Jueshan si ta 觉山寺塔	Lingqiu County 灵丘县	5-245	Upload file
Zishou Temple	Zishou si 资寿寺	Lingshi County 灵石县	5-246	Upload file
Qingliang Temple	Qingliang si 清凉寺	Ruicheng County 芮城县	5-247	Upload file
Guangrenwang Temple	Guangrenwang miao 广仁王庙	Ruicheng County 芮城县	5-248	Upload file
Ruicheng Chenghuang Temple	Ruicheng Chenghuang miao 芮城城隍庙	Ruicheng County 芮城县	5-249	Upload file
Fanzhou Chanshi Pagoda	Fanzhou Chanshi ta 泛舟禅师塔	Yuncheng 运城市	5-250	Upload file
Hongfu Temple	Hongfu si 洪福寺	Dingxiang County 定襄县	5-251	Upload file
Hongji Temple	Hongji yuan 洪济院	Wuxiang County 武乡县	5-252	Upload file
Wuxiang County Dayun Temple	Wuxiang xian Dayun si 武乡县大云寺	Wuxiang County 武乡县	5-253	Upload file
Huixian Temple	Huixian guan 会仙观	Wuxiang County 武乡县	5-254	Upload file
Dawang Temple	Dawang miao 大王庙	Yu County 盂县	5-255	Upload file
Linjin County Seat of Government	Linjin xian ya 临晋县衙	Linyi County 临猗县	5-256	Upload file
Xiangyan Temple	Xiangyan si 香严寺	Liulin County 柳林县	5-257	Upload file
Hongdong Yuhuang Temple	Hongdong Yuhuang miao 洪洞玉皇庙	Hongdong County 洪洞县	5-258	Upload file
Hunyuan Yong'an Temple	Hunyuan Yong'an si 浑源永安寺	Hunyuan County 浑源县	5-259	Upload file
Taiyin Temple	Taiyin si 太阴寺	Jiang County 绛县	5-260	Upload file
Sanzong Temple	Sanzong miao 三嵕庙	Huguan County 壶关县	5-261	Upload file
Qiao Family Compound	Qiaojia dayuan 乔家大院	Qi County 祁县	5-262	Upload file
Zezhou Dai Temple	Zezhou Dai miao 泽州岱庙	Zezhou County 泽州县	5-263	Upload file
Anguo Temple	Anguo si 安国寺	Lüliang 吕梁市	5-264	Upload file
Xiaohuiling Erxian Temple	Xiaohuiling erxian miao 小会岭二仙庙	Lingchuan County 陵川县	5-265	Upload file
Cui Fujun Temple	Cui Fujun miao 崔府君庙	Lingchuan County 陵川县	5-266	Upload file
Xixi Erxian Temple	Xixi erxian miao 西溪二仙庙	Lingchuan County 陵川县	5-267	Upload file
Chongming Temple	Chongming si 崇明寺	Gaoping 高平市	5-268	Upload file
Kaihua Temple	Kaihua si 开化寺	Gaoping 高平市	5-269	Upload file
Youxian Temple	Youxian si 游仙寺	Gaoping 高平市	5-270	Upload file
Dinglin Temple	Dinglin si 定林寺	Gaoping 高平市	5-271	Upload file
Fusheng Temple	Fusheng si 福胜寺	Xinjiang County 新绛县	5-272	Upload file
Jiyi Temple	Jiyi miao 稷益庙	Xinjiang County 新绛县	5-273	Upload file
Baishan Dongyue Temple	Baishan Dongyue miao 柏山东岳庙	Pu County 蒲县	5-274	Upload file
Qinglong Temple	Qinglong si 青龙寺	Jishan County 稷山县	5-275	Upload file
Yuanqi Temple	Yuanqi si 原起寺	Lucheng 潞城市	5-276	Upload file
Great Wall at Yanmen Pass	Changcheng - Yanmen Pass 长城—雁门关	39°11′37″N 112°52′13″E Dai County 代县	5-442(7)	Upload file
Tianlongshan Grottoes	Tianlongshan shiku 天龙山石窟	Taiyuan 太原市	5-445	Upload file
Tashuihe Site	Tashuihe yizhi 塔水河遗址	Lingchuan County 陵川县	6-21	Upload file
Shangguo Site, Qiujiazhuang Tombs	Shangguo chengzhi he Qiujiazhuang muqun 上郭城址和邱家庄墓群	Wenxi County 闻喜县	6-22	Upload file
Nancun Site	Nancun chengzhi 南村城址	Fangshan County 方山县	6-23	Upload file
Road along the Yellow River	Huang He zhandao yizhi 黄河栈道遗址	Pinglu District 平陆县	6-24	Upload file
Huozhou Kiln Site	Huozhou yaozhi 霍州窑址	Huozhou 霍州市	6-25	Upload file
Hongshan Kiln Site	Hongshan yaozhi 洪山窑址	Jiexiu 介休市	6-26	Upload file
Cuijiahe Tombs	Cuijiahe muqun 崔家河墓群	Xia County 夏县	6-230	Upload file
Shaliangpo Tombs	Shaliangpo muqun 沙梁坡墓群	Tianzhen County 天镇县	6-231	Upload file
Guchengbao Tombs	Guchengbao muqun 古城堡墓群	Yanggao County 阳高县	6-232	Upload file
Wangjiafeng Tombs	Wangjiafeng muqun 王家峰墓群	Taiyuan 太原市	6-233	Upload file
Shitie Tombs	Shitie muqun 什贴墓群	Jinzhong 晋中市	6-234	Upload file
Tomb of Li Yumei	Li Yumei mu 栗毓美墓	Hunyuan County 浑源县	6-235	Upload file
Laojun Cave	Laojun dong 老君洞	Fushan County 浮山县	6-355	Upload file
Guashan Tianning Temple	Guashan Tianning si 卦山天宁寺	Jiaocheng County 交城县	6-356	Upload file
Tang Temple in Xiajiao	Xiajiao Tang di miao 下交汤帝庙	35°24′52″N 112°21′24″E Yangcheng County 阳城县	6-357	Upload file
Jinguang Temple	Jinguang si 普光寺	Shouyang County 寿阳县	6-358	Upload file
Jindong Temple	Jindong si 金洞寺	Xinzhou 忻州市	6-359	Upload file
Anchan Temple	Anchan si 安禅寺	Taigu County 太谷县	6-360	Upload file
Wubian Temple	Wubian si 无边寺	Taigu County 太谷县	6-361	Upload file
Hutu Temple	Hutu miao 狐突庙	Qingxu County 清徐县	6-362	Upload file
Beiyicheng Jade Emperor Temple	Beiyicheng Yuhuang miao 北义城玉皇庙	Zezhou County 泽州县	6-363	Upload file
Zhoucun Dongyue Temple	Zhoucun Dongyue miao 周村东岳庙	Zezhou County 泽州县	6-364	Upload file
Zhangbi Old Fortress	Zhangbi gubao 张壁古堡	Jiexiu 介休市	6-365	Upload file
Fotou Temple	Fotou si 佛头寺	Pingshun County 平顺县	6-366	Upload file
Xingfan Temple	Xingfan si 兴梵寺	Qi County 祁县	6-367	Upload file
Dingxiang Guanwang Temple	Dingxiang Guanwang miao 定襄关王庙	Dingxiang County 定襄县	6-368	Upload file
Miaodao Temple Double Pagoda	Miaodao si shuangta 妙道寺双塔	Linyi County 临猗县	6-369	Upload file
Chanfang Temple Pagoda	Chanfang si ta 禅房寺塔	Datong 大同市	6-370	Upload file
Kaifu Temple	Kaifu si 开福寺	Yangcheng County 阳城县	6-371	Upload file
Baitai Temple	Baitai si 白台寺	Xinjiang County 新绛县	6-372	Upload file
Prince Lingze Temple	Lingze wang miao 灵泽王庙	Xiangyuan County 襄垣县	6-373	Upload file
Xilimen Erxian Temple	Xilimen Erxian miao 西李门二仙庙	Gaoping 高平市	6-374	Upload file
Runcheng Dongyue Temple	Runcheng Dongyue miao 润城东岳庙	Yangcheng County 阳城县	6-375	Upload file
Yuquan Dongyue Temple	Yuquan Dongyue miao 玉泉东岳庙	Lingchuan County 陵川县	6-376	Upload file
Shizhang Jade Emperor Temple	Shizhang Yuhuang miao 石掌玉皇庙	Lingchuan County 陵川县	6-377	Upload file
Dongyi Longwang Temple	Dongyi Longwang miao 东邑龙王庙	Lucheng 潞城市	6-378	Upload file
Xiangning Shousheng Temple	Xiangning Shousheng si 乡宁寿圣寺	Xiangning County 乡宁县	6-379	Upload file
Jingyin Temple	Jingyin si 净因寺	Taiyuan 太原市	6-380	Upload file
Yanqing Temple	Yanqing si 延庆寺	Wutai County 五台县	6-381	Upload file
Zhongping Erxian Temple	Zhongping Erxian gong 中坪二仙宫	Gaoping 高平市	6-382	Upload file
Sansheng Temple	Sansheng si 三圣寺	Fanshi County 繁峙县	6-383	Upload file
Old Architecture of Fencheng	Fencheng gu jianzhuqun 汾城古建筑群	Xiangfen County 襄汾县	6-384	Upload file
Fuxiang Temple	Fuxiang si 福祥寺	Yushe County 榆社县	6-385	Upload file
Baiyugong	Baiyu gong 白玉宫	Lingchuan County 陵川县	6-386	Upload file
Erlang Temple	Erlang miao 二郞庙	Gaoping 高平市	6-387	Upload file
Zhensheng Temple	Zhensheng si 真圣寺	Taigu County 太谷县	6-388	Upload file
Qingyuan Confucian Temple	Qingyuan wenmiao 清源文庙	Qingxu County 清徐县	6-389	Upload file
Nanshentou Erxian Temple	Nanshentou Erxian miao 南神头二仙庙	Lingchuan County 陵川县	6-390	Upload file
Sirun Sanjiaotang Hall	Sirun Sanjiao tang 寺润三教堂	Lingchuan County 陵川县	6-391	Upload file
Sansheng Ruixian Pagoda	Sansheng ruixian ta 三圣瑞现塔	Lingchuan County 陵川县	6-392	Upload file
Huilong Temple	Huilong si 回龙寺	Pingshun County 平顺县	6-393	Upload file
Puzhao Temple Main Hall	Puzhao si dadian 普照寺大殿	Qin County 沁县	6-394	Upload file
Zhaozewang Temple	Zhaoze wang miao 昭泽王庙	Xiangyuan County 襄垣县	6-395	Upload file
Tianwang Temple	Tianwang si 天王寺	Zhangzi County 长子县	6-396	Upload file
Bu'er Temple	Bu'er si 不二寺	Yangqu County 阳曲县	6-397	Upload file
Jingtu Temple	Jingtu si 净土寺	Ying County 应县	6-398	Upload file
Yiju Temple	Yiju si 义居寺	Lin County 临县	6-399	Upload file
Mausoleum and Temple of Shun	Shun di lingmiao 舜帝陵庙	Yuncheng 运城市	6-400	Upload file
Chongsheng Temple	Chongsheng si 崇圣寺	Yushe County 榆社县	6-401	Upload file
Chong'an Temple	Chong'an si 崇安寺	Lingchuan County 陵川县	6-402	Upload file
Dongyang Houtu Temple	Dongyang Houtu miao 东羊后土庙	Linfen 临汾市	6-403	Upload file
Fujun Temple	Fujun miao 府君庙	Yu County 盂县	6-404	Upload file
Poutu Taishan Temple	Potou Taishan miao 坡头泰山庙	Yu County 盂县	6-405	Upload file
Yiji Shengmu Temple	Yiji shengmu miao 懿济圣母庙	Heshun County 和顺县	6-406	Upload file
Qingxu Temple	Qingxu guan 清虚观	Pingyao County 平遥县	6-407	Upload file
Fenyang Wuyue Temple	Fenyang Wuyue miao 汾阳五岳庙	Fenyang 汾阳市	6-408	Upload file
Qingchu Temple	Qingchu guan 清梦观	Gaoping 高平市	6-409	Upload file
Dayang Tangdi Temple	Dayang Tangdi miao 大阳汤帝庙	Zezhou County 泽州县	6-410	Upload file
Huozhou Guanyin Temple	Huozhou Guanyin miao 霍州观音庙	Huozhou 霍州市	6-411	Upload file
Huiluan Temple	Huiluan si 回銮寺	Jiexiu 介休市	6-412	Upload file
Xia Yu Temple	Xia Yu shen ci 夏禹神祠	Pingshun County 平顺县	6-413	Upload file
Jinzhuang Confucian Temple	Jinzhuang wenmiao 金庄文庙	Pingyao County 平遥县	6-414	Upload file
Qiaogoutou Jade Emperor Temple	Qiaogoutou Yuhuang miao 乔沟头玉皇庙	Xinjiang County 新绛县	6-415	Upload file
Changzhi Jade Emperor Temple	Changzhi Yuhuang guan 长治玉皇观	Changzhi County 长治县	6-416	Upload file
Sishenggong	Sisheng gong 四圣宫	Yicheng County 翼城县	6-417	Upload file
Zhenze Erxian Palace	Zhenze Erxian gong 真泽二仙宫	Huguan County 壶关县	6-418	Upload file
Pujing Temple	Pujing si 普净寺	Xiangfen County 襄汾县	6-419	Upload file
Jinci Temple	Jinci miao 晋祠庙	Lingshi County 灵石县	6-420	Upload file
Houji Temple	Houji miao 后稷庙	Wenxi County 闻喜县	6-421	Upload file
Baofeng Temple	Baofeng si 宝峰寺	Tunliu County 屯留县	6-422	Upload file
Futian Temple	Futian si 福田寺	Shouyang County 寿阳县	6-423	Upload file
Wangqu Dongyue Temple	Wangqu Dongyue miao 王曲东岳庙	Linfen 临汾市	6-424	Upload file
Longxiang Guandi Temple	Longxiang Guandi miao 龙香关帝庙	Xinjiang County 新绛县	6-425	Upload file
Jiexiu Dongyue Temple	Jiexiu Dongyue miao 介休东岳庙	Jiexiu 介休市	6-426	Upload file
Longxing Temple	Xinjiang Longxing si 新绛龙兴寺	Xinjiang County 新绛县	6-427	Upload file
Xiangyuan Confucian Temple	Xiangyuan wenmiao 襄垣文庙	Xiangyuan County 襄垣县	6-428	Upload file
Huanghua Temple	Huanghua si 光化寺	Taigu County 太谷县	6-429	Upload file
Jishan Jiwang Temple	Jishan Jiwang miao 稷山稷王庙	Jishan County 稷山县	6-430	Upload file
Nanhan Dongyue Temple	Nanhan Dongyue miao 南撖东岳庙	Yicheng County 翼城县	6-431	Upload file
Guzhong Temple	Guzhong miao 古中庙	Gaoping 高平市	6-432	Upload file
Jingyungong Jade Emperor Hall	Jingyun gong yuhuang dian 景云宫玉皇殿	Jiang County 绛县	6-433	Upload file
Dayang Taishan Temple	Dayang Taishan miao 大洋泰山庙	Xia County 夏县	6-434	Upload file
Erlang Temple North Hall	Erlang miao beidian 二郎庙北殿	Yuanqu County 垣曲县	6-435	Upload file
Niandui Jade Emperor Temple	Niandui Yuhuang miao 埝堆玉皇庙	Yuanqu County 垣曲县	6-436	Upload file
Xiyang Chongjiao Temple	Xiyang Chongjiao si 昔阳崇教寺	Xiyang County 昔阳县	6-437	Upload file
Zuoquan Confucian Temple Main Hall	Zuoquan wenmiao Dacheng dian 左权文庙大成殿	Zuoquan County 左权县	6-438	Upload file
Zhaili Guandi Temple Offerings Hall	Zhaili Guandi miao xiandian 寨里关帝庙献殿	Yuncheng 运城市	6-439	Upload file
Guocun Taishan Temple Main Hall	Guocun Taishan miao dadian 郭村泰山庙大殿	Yuncheng 运城市	6-440	Upload file
Liyinghou Temple	Li ying hou miao 利应侯庙	Pingyao County 平遥县	6-441	Upload file
Lingshi Houtu Temple	Lingshi Houtu miao 灵石后土庙	Lingshi County 灵石县	6-442	Upload file
Sanguan Temple	Sanguan miao 三官庙	Xinjiang County 新绛县	6-443	Upload file
Guduo Houtu Temple	Guduo Houtu miao 古垛后土庙	Hejin 河津市	6-444	Upload file
Qiaoze Temple Stage	Qiaoze miao xitai 乔泽庙戏台	Yicheng County 翼城县	6-445	Upload file
Shanqing Temple	Shanqing si 善庆寺	Lin County 临县	6-446	Upload file
Old Architecture of Qikou	Qikou gu jianzhuqun 碛口古建筑群	Lin County 临县	6-447	Upload file
Haihui Temple	Haihui si 海会寺	Yangcheng County 阳城县	6-448	Upload file
Yao Mausoleum	Yao ling 尧陵	Linfen 临汾市	6-449	Upload file
Shuishen Temple	Shuishen tang 水神堂	Guangling County 广灵县	6-450	Upload file
Liu Family Residence	Liushi minju 柳氏民居	Qinshui County 沁水县	6-451	Upload file
Xiangyu Old Fortress	Xiangyu gubao 湘峪古堡	Qinshui County 沁水县	6-452	Upload file
Old Architecture of Guobicun	Guobicun gu jianzhuqun 郭壁村古建筑群	Qinshui County 沁水县	6-453	Upload file
Old Architecture of Douzhuang	Douzhuang gu jianzhuqun 窦庄古建筑群	Qinshui County 沁水县	6-454	Upload file
Pingyao Qingliang Temple	Pingyao Qingliang si 平遥清凉寺	Pingyao County 平遥县	6-455	Upload file
Wenfeng Pagoda	Wenfeng ta 文峰塔	Fenyang 汾阳市	6-456	Upload file
Dai County Confucian Temple	Dai xian wenmiao 代县文庙	Dai County 代县	6-457	Upload file
Gongzhu Temple	Gongzhu si 公主寺	Fanshi County 繁峙县	6-458	Upload file
Wang Family Mansion	Wangjia dayuan 王家大院	Lingshi County 灵石县	6-459	Upload file
Old Architecture of Guoyucun	Guoyucun gu jianzhuqun 郭峪村古建筑群	Yangcheng County 阳城县	6-460	Upload file
Mengjiagou Longquan Temple	Mengjiagou Longquan si 孟家沟龙泉寺	Shouyang County 寿阳县	6-461	Upload file
Tianzhen Temple	Tianzhen guan 天贞观	Lüliang 吕梁市	6-462	Upload file
Caojia Mansion	Caojia dayuan 曹家大院	Taigu County 太谷县	6-463	Upload file
Jingxin Temple	Jingxin si 净信寺	Taigu County 太谷县	6-464	Upload file
Mingxiu Temple	Mingxiu si 明秀寺	Taiyuan 太原市	6-465	Upload file
Duofu Temple	Duofu si 多福寺	Taiyuan 太原市	6-466	Upload file
Twin Pagoda Temple (Yongzuo Temple)	Yongzuo si 永祚寺	37°50′51″N 112°35′48″E Taiyuan 太原市	6-467	Upload file
Wanquan Confucian Temple	Wanquan wenmiao 万泉文庙	Wanrong County 万荣县	6-468	Upload file
Dongfeng Stage	Dongfeng xitai 董封戏台	Jiang County 绛县	6-469	Upload file
Yunlin Temple	Yunlin si 云林寺	Yanggao County 阳高县	6-470	Upload file
Dijicheng	Dijicheng 砥洎城	Yangcheng County 阳城县	6-471	Upload file
Ciyun Temple	Ciyun si 慈云寺	Tianzhen County 天镇县	6-472	Upload file
Guangwucheng	Guangwu cheng 广武城	Shanyin County 山阴县	6-473	Upload file
Lu'an Prefectural Seat of Government	Lu'an fu ya 潞安府衙	Changzhi 长治市	6-474	Upload file
Qujia Mansion	Qujia dayuan 渠家大院	Qi County 祁县	6-475	Upload file
Xinghuacun Fenjiu Liquor Factory	Xinghuacun Fenjiu zuofang 杏花村汾酒作坊	Fenyang 汾阳市	6-476	Upload file
Mimi Temple	Mimi si 秘密寺	Fanshi County 繁峙县	6-477	Upload file
Tiefo Temple	Tiefo si 铁佛寺	Linfen 临汾市	6-478	Upload file
Changping Guandi Temple	Changping Guandi miao 常平关帝庙	Yuncheng 运城市	6-479	Upload file
Zhongyanglou	Zhongyang lou 中阳楼	Xiaoyi 孝义市	6-480	Upload file
Old Architecture of Shijiagou	Shijiagou gu jianzhuqun 师家沟古建筑群	Fenxi County 汾西县	6-481	Upload file
Wahuang Temple	Wahuang miao 娲皇庙	Huozhou 霍州市	6-482	Upload file
Pingyao City God Temple	Pingyao chenghuang miao 平遥城隍庙	Pingyao County 平遥县	6-483	Upload file
Former Site of Rishengchang	Rishengchang jiuzhi 日昇昌旧址	Pingyao County 平遥县	6-484	Upload file
Taiheyan Pailou	Taiheyan pailou 太和岩牌楼	Jiexiu 介休市	6-485	Upload file
Jiexiu Wuyue Temple	Jiexiu Wuyue miao 介休五岳庙	Jiexiu 介休市	6-486	Upload file
Yangtoushan Caves	Yangtou shan shiku 羊头山石窟	Gaoping 高平市	6-815	Upload file
Biluo Temple	Biluo si 碧落寺	Zezhou County 泽州县	6-816	Upload file
Jindeng Temple Caves	Jindeng si shiku 金灯寺石窟	Pingshun County 平顺县	6-817	Upload file
Former Residence of Xu Xiangqian	Xu Xiangqian guju 徐向前故居	Wutai County 五台县	6-904	Upload file
Mass Grave of the Datong Coal Miners	Datong meikuang wanrenkeng 大同煤矿万人坑	Datong 大同市	6-905	Upload file
Xihetou Tunnel Warfare Site	Xihetou didaozhan yizhi 西河头地道战遗址	Dingxiang County 定襄县	6-906	Upload file
Former Site of the Shanxi Third Middle School	Shanxi shengli di-san zhongxue jiuzhi 山西省立第三中学旧址	Datong 大同市	6-907	Upload file
Former Site of the Huangyadong Arms Factory	Huangyadong binggongchang jiuzhi 黄崖洞兵工厂旧址	Licheng County 黎城县	6-908	Upload file

As well as sites protected at the national level, there are 696 sites in Shanxi that are protected at the provincial level (see 山西省文物保护单位).

== See also ==
- Principles for the Conservation of Heritage Sites in China
