= Peng (Western Zhou state) =

倗
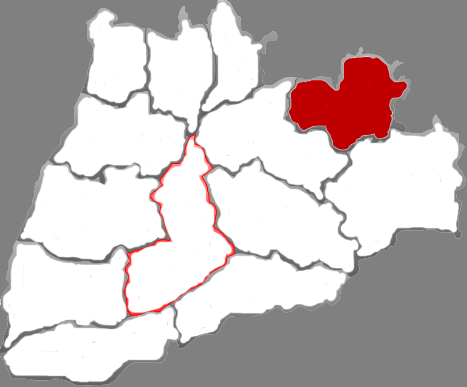
- Jiang County, Yuncheng, where Peng was located.
- Capital: Modern-day Jiang County in Yuncheng, Shanxi
- Common languages: Old Chinese
- Religion: Ancestor veneration
- Government: Fiefdom
- Earl (伯)
  - c. 9th Century BCE: Cheng, Earl of Peng (倗伯偁)
  - c. 9th Century BCE: Zhao, Earl of Peng (倗伯肇)
- Historical era: Western Zhou

Peng (Chinese: 倗) was a vassal state of the Western Zhou dynasty, located in present-day Shanxi Province.

== History ==
Little is known about the State of Peng, as it was not recorded in Qin-Han dynasty histories. However, from the bronze inscriptions seen in tombs, it appears to have been a state with significant local power. The state was located close to Chengzhou, the capital of Western Zhou, and south of Jin. One ding notes a Duke of Yi (益公) praising Cheng, Earl of Peng. Cheng would outlive his wife, Bi Ji (畢姬), and make many bronzes in her honour. Zhao, Earl of Peng and presumably the heir to Cheng, would make a vessel in honour of his father.

=== Periodization ===
Excavators believe the State of Peng dates back to the reign of King Mu of Zhou in the 9th Century BCE, though some argue it may date back further to King Gong of Zhou's reign, given when the excavated tombs M1 and M2 were closed (c. 922-900 BCE) and the closeness in which the bronzes resemble those from his reign.

== Archaeology ==
In April 2004, a cemetery were discovered in Hengbei, Yuncheng, wherein laid individuals from the State of Peng. In 2006, whilst cleaning artifacts taken from the tomb, bronze inscriptions were found that were written by Cheng, Earl of Peng (倗伯爯) to his wife, Bi Ji (畢姬), which were used to confirm the fact. The tombs contained decorations made of jade, chariots, and numerous traditional bronzes, such as five dings, used for ancestor veneration.

== Ancestry ==
Maria Khayutina notes that the individuals of Peng bore the Kui (媿) or Gui (鬼) surnames, which are associated with the di (狄 or 翟) "barbarian" groups in received texts.

Genetic tests on the bodies in the tomb revealed a predominance of Y-haplogroup Q1a1 in the tested male subset, substantial O3 as the next most common paternal lineage, and a mtDNA profile made up of East Eurasian lineages that have been argued as closest to present-day northern Han Chinese. Therefore, the genetics of northern Han Chinese people stabilised around 3,000 years ago around the State of Peng, and grew to be distinct from other ethnicities.
