= Lingchuan =

Lingchuan may refer to two counties in the People's Republic of China:

- Lingchuan County, Guangxi (灵川县)
- Lingchuan County, Shanxi (陵川县)
