= Wuxiang =

Wuxiang may refer to:

- Waxiang Chinese (瓦乡话), a dialect of Chinese
- Wuxiang County (武乡县), Changzhi, Shanxi, China
- Wuxiang, Ningbo (五乡镇), town in Yinzhou District, Ningbo, Zhejiang, China
- Five-spice powder (五香粉), mixture of five spices used in Chinese cuisine
