= Gongzhu Temple =

Buddhist temple in Xinzhou, Shanxi, China

- 公主寺

- Location within Shanxi

Religion
- Affiliation: Buddhism
- Deity: Chan Buddhism

Location
- Location: Xingyuan Township, Fanshi County, Shanxi
- Country: China
- Interactive map of Gongzhu Temple
- Coordinates: 39°09′39″N 113°23′03″E

Architecture
- Style: Chinese architecture
- Established: Northern Wei (386–534)

Gongzhu Temple or Princess Temple (Chinese: 公主寺; pinyin: Gōngzhǔ Sì) is a Buddhist temple located in Xingyuan Township of Fanshi County, Shanxi, China.

== History ==
The original temple dates back to the 4th century, in the Northern Wei (386–534). Legend said that the temple was built by Princess Chengxin, the fourth daughter of Emperor Wencheng.

According to the Records of Qingliang Mountain (清凉山志), the temple belonged to the jurisdiction of Mount Wutai.

On 18 August 1986, the temple was designated as a provincial key cultural preservation unit by the Shanxi Provincial Government.

On 25 May 2006, it was listed among the sixth batch of "Major National Historical and Cultural Sites in Shanxi" by the State Council of China.

== Architecture ==
The entire complex faces the south. Along the central axis are the Shanmen, Second Hall, Mahavira Hall, and Back Hall.

=== Mahavira Hall ===
The Mahavira Hall still preserves the architectural style of the Ming dynasty. It has single-eave overhanging gable roof with a 35-centimetre (14 in) high base. Inner walls are painted with frescos over 90 square metres (970 sq ft). There are thirty Ming dynasty (1368–1644) statues in the hall. In the middle is Sakyamuni, statues of Amitabha and Bhaisajyaguru stand on the left and right sides of Sakyamuni's statue. In front of Sakyamuni stand Ananda and Kassapa Buddha on the left and right. The statues of Eighteen Arhats sitting on the seats before both sides of the gable walls.

== Gallery ==
Statues of Sakyamuni, Ananda and Kassapa Buddha at the hall.

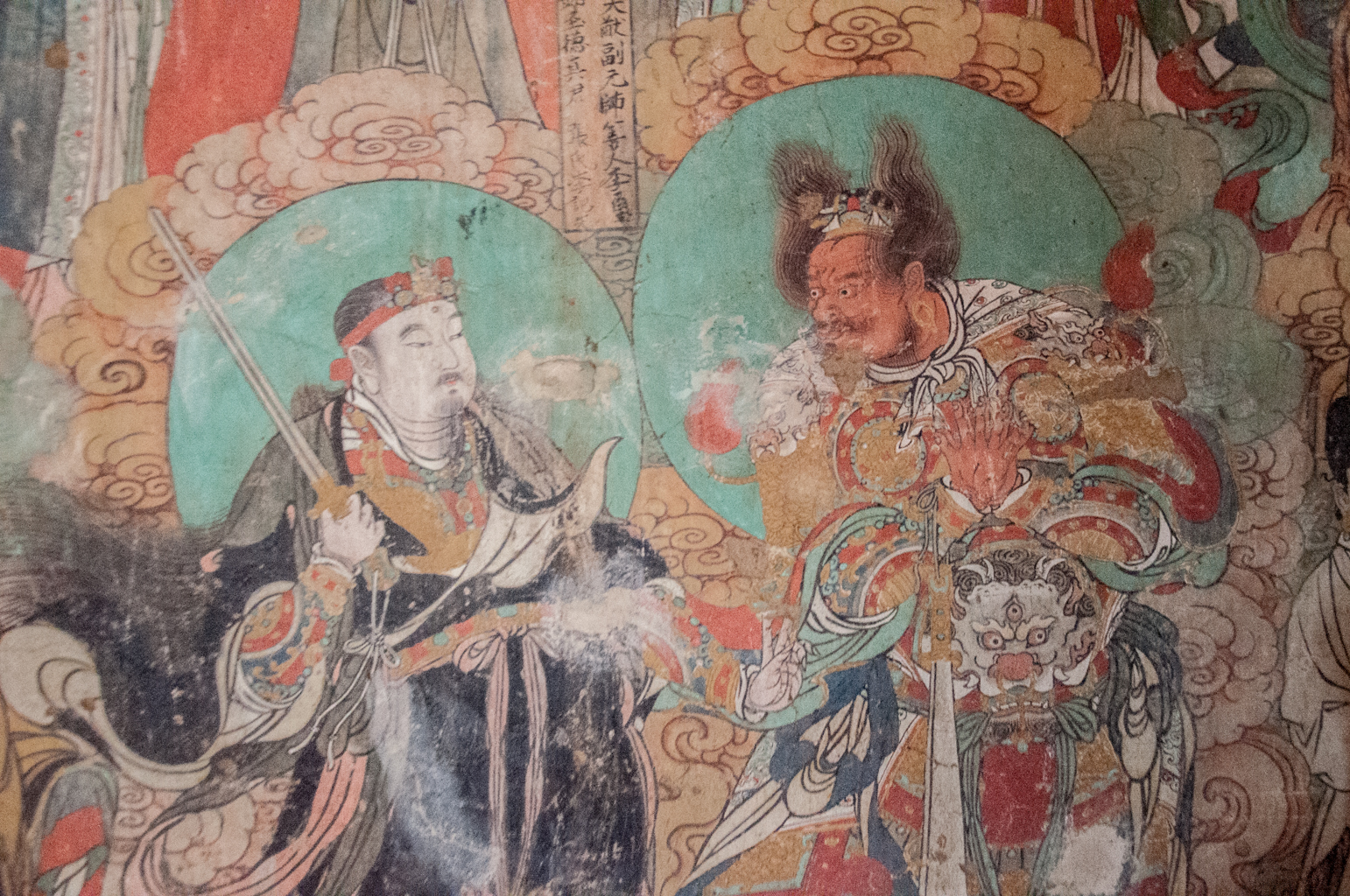
Fresco.

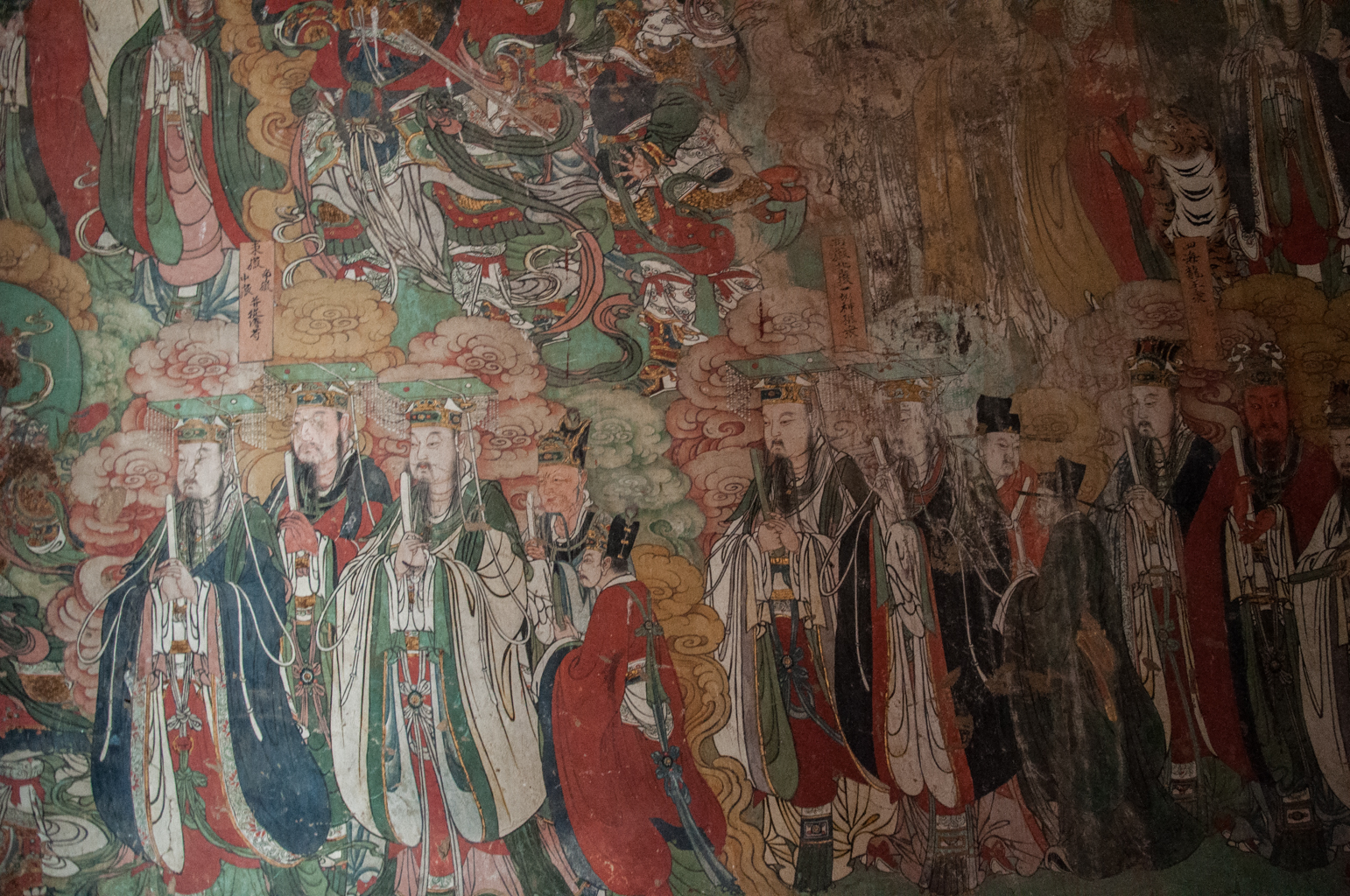
Fresco.
