= Qinglong Temple (Jishan County) =

Buddhist temple in Jishan County, Shanxi, China

- 青龙寺
- Location within Shanxi Location within China

Religion
- Affiliation: Buddhism
- Deity: Chan Buddhism

Location
- Location: Jishan County, Shanxi
- Country: China
- Coordinates: 35°35′38″N 110°56′02″E

Architecture
- Style: Chinese architecture
- Funded by: Wang Zheng
- Established: 662

Qinglong Temple (simplified Chinese: 青龙寺; traditional Chinese: 青龍寺; pinyin: Qínglóng Sì) is a Buddhist temple located in Jishan County, Shanxi, China. The temple is renowned for its frescos which were painted in both Yuan and Ming dynasties (1127–1644). The temple occupies an area of 6,857.9-square-metre (73,818 sq ft) and the total area including temple lands, forests and mountains is over 6,926.67-square-metre (74,558.1 sq ft).

== History ==
Qinglong Temple was first constructed by Minister of Public Works Wang Zheng (王政) in 662, namely the 2nd year in the reign of Emperor Gaozong in the Tang dynasty (618–907).

Qinglong Temple has been rebuilt numerous times since the Yuan dynasty (1127–1368).

On June 25, 2001, it has been listed among the fifth batch of "Major National Historical and Cultural Sites in Shaanxi" by the State Council of China.

== Architecture ==
Qinglong Temple consists of more than 10 buildings including shanmen, Main Hall, Middle Hall, Hall of Ten Kings of Hell, Hall of Guru, Hufa Hall, Hall of Sangharama Palace, east wing-room, west wing-room, etc. The temple still maintain the style of the Yuan and Ming dynasties (1127–1644).

== National treasure ==
Inner walls of the Main Hall, Middle Hall and the Hall of Sangharama Palace are fully painted with frescos, most of them were made in the Ming dynasty (1368–1644), and the most famous are the Eighteen Arhats, Three-Life Buddha, Ten Kings of Hell, and Ten Thousands of Taoist Gods.
