= Xinjiang County =

County in Shanxi, China

Xinjiang County 新绛县 Sinkiang, Hsin-chiang
- County
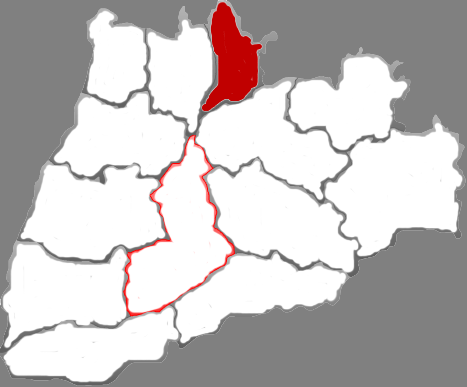
- Location in Yuncheng

- Location of the seat in Shanxi
- Coordinates: 35°36′59″N 111°13′30″E
- Country: People's Republic of China
- Province: Shanxi
- Prefecture-level city: Yuncheng

Area
  - Total: 594 km^{2} (229 sq mi)

Population (2020)
  - Total: 282,230
  - Density: 475/km^{2} (1,230/sq mi)
- Time zone: UTC+8 (China Standard)
- Website: www.jiangzhou.gov.cn

Xinjiang County (Chinese: 新绛县; pinyin: Xīnjiàng Xiàn), formerly Jiangzhou (Chinese: 绛州), lies in the municipal region of Yuncheng in the southwest of Shanxi province, China.

== Situation ==
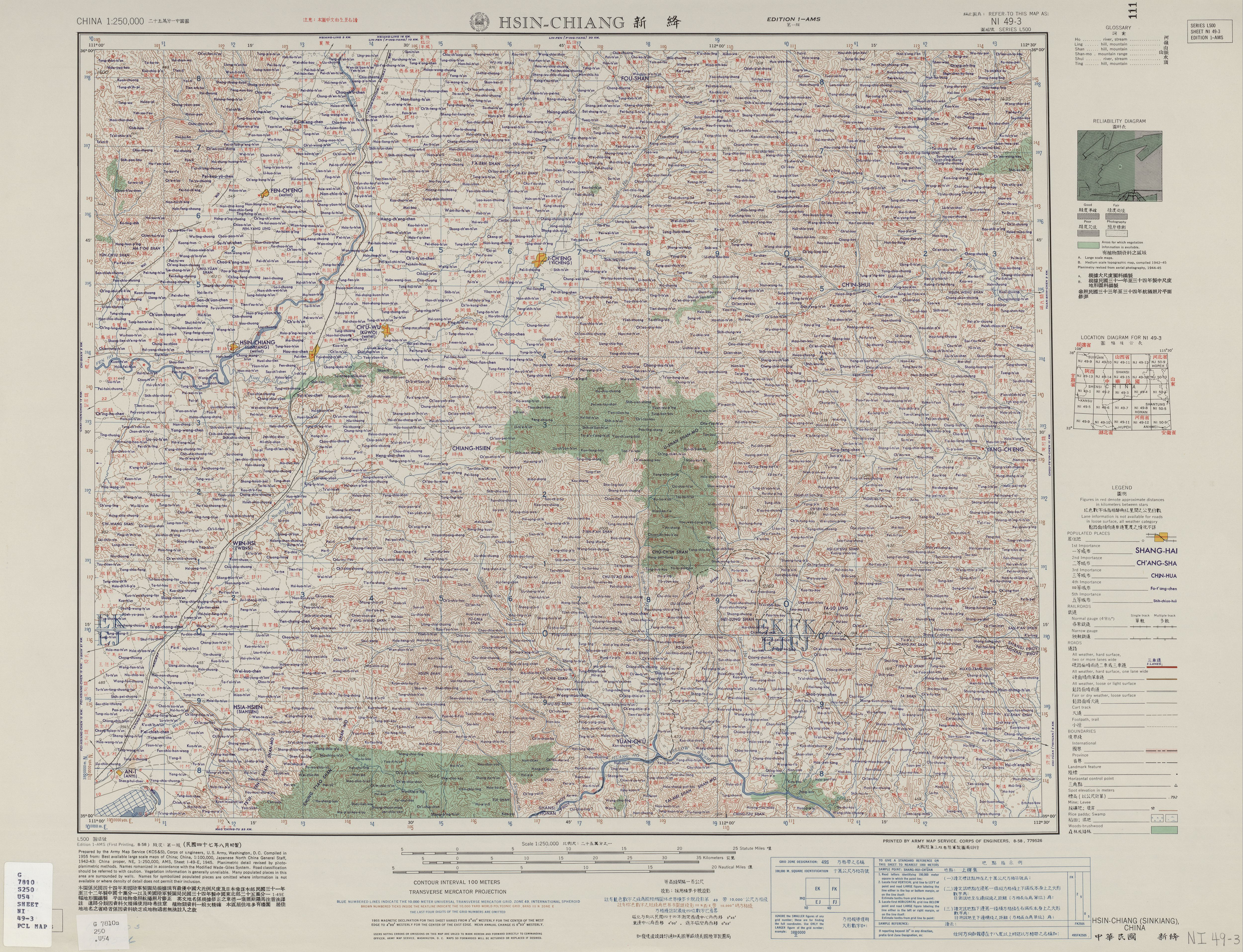
Map including Xinjiang (labeled as HSIN-CHIANG (SINKIANG) (walled) 新絳) (AMS, 1955)

The county's area is approximately 600 km^{2}. It is bordered by Wenxi County to the east and Jishan County to the west. Xiangning County to the northwest, Xiangfen County to the northeast, and Houma City to the east are all in Linfen Municipality.

The Fen River, a major tributary of the Yellow, flows westward through the county.

== Administration ==
Xinjiang's population is 320,000 (2002). The county executive, legislature, and judiciary are in Longxing Town (龙兴镇), together with the CPC and PSB branches.

== Climate ==
Climate data for Xinjiang, elevation 431 m (1,414 ft), (1991–2020 normals, extremes 1981–2010)
Month	Jan	Feb	Mar	Apr	May	Jun	Jul	Aug	Sep	Oct	Nov	Dec	Year
Record high °C (°F)	14.2 (57.6)	20.9 (69.6)	28.8 (83.8)	36.2 (97.2)	39.4 (102.9)	41.5 (106.7)	41.2 (106.2)	39.5 (103.1)	39.9 (103.8)	33.0 (91.4)	24.1 (75.4)	14.7 (58.5)	41.5 (106.7)
Mean daily maximum °C (°F)	5.0 (41.0)	9.7 (49.5)	16.1 (61.0)	22.9 (73.2)	28.1 (82.6)	32.5 (90.5)	33.2 (91.8)	31.2 (88.2)	26.4 (79.5)	20.1 (68.2)	12.6 (54.7)	6.1 (43.0)	20.3 (68.6)
Daily mean °C (°F)	−1.2 (29.8)	3.1 (37.6)	9.3 (48.7)	15.8 (60.4)	21.0 (69.8)	25.7 (78.3)	27.2 (81.0)	25.5 (77.9)	20.5 (68.9)	13.9 (57.0)	6.4 (43.5)	0.2 (32.4)	14.0 (57.1)
Mean daily minimum °C (°F)	−5.9 (21.4)	−1.9 (28.6)	3.7 (38.7)	9.6 (49.3)	14.7 (58.5)	19.7 (67.5)	22.4 (72.3)	21.1 (70.0)	16.0 (60.8)	9.1 (48.4)	1.7 (35.1)	−4.3 (24.3)	8.8 (47.9)
Record low °C (°F)	−19.2 (−2.6)	−21.3 (−6.3)	−10.8 (12.6)	−4.1 (24.6)	0.2 (32.4)	9.8 (49.6)	14.6 (58.3)	13.6 (56.5)	4.1 (39.4)	−5.2 (22.6)	−14.0 (6.8)	−20.4 (−4.7)	−21.3 (−6.3)
Average precipitation mm (inches)	6.0 (0.24)	8.8 (0.35)	12.4 (0.49)	32.7 (1.29)	44.8 (1.76)	52.9 (2.08)	104.2 (4.10)	87.8 (3.46)	75.7 (2.98)	45.0 (1.77)	20.4 (0.80)	4.0 (0.16)	494.7 (19.48)
Average precipitation days (≥ 0.1 mm)	2.6	3.1	4.2	5.8	7.3	7.5	9.5	8.7	9.0	7.2	4.7	2.1	71.7
Average snowy days	3.3	2.8	0.9	0.2	0	0	0	0	0	0	1.2	2.5	10.9
Average relative humidity (%)	55	53	50	52	54	55	66	69	70	69	66	58	60
Mean monthly sunshine hours	141.7	147.3	183.9	215.9	234.1	218.6	212.0	193.3	159.5	155.4	141.2	139.2	2,142.1
Percentage possible sunshine	45	47	49	55	54	50	48	47	43	45	46	46	48
Source: China Meteorological Administration

== Industry ==
Until recently, its industry was dominated by the production of handicrafts, including lacquerware, embroidery, and leather goods, as well as the manufacture of drugs.

== Culture ==
Xinjiang is known for its folk opera performances.

The county is the home of the Jiangzhou Drum Troupe (山西绛州鼓乐团, also known as Shanxi Jiangzhou Drum Art Ensemble, 山西绛州鼓乐艺术团), China's most famous traditional percussion ensemble, which was founded in 1987.

== History ==
Until the Xinhai Revolution, Xinjiang was known as Jiangzhou (Chinese: 绛州; pinyin: Jiàngzhōu).

== Famous Locals ==
- The Chan Buddhist monk Yaoshan Weiyan (药山惟俨, 751–834)
- The Ming scholar-official and Roman Catholic Thomas Han (韓霖, Han Lin, 1601–1649)

== See also ==
- List of administrative divisions of Shanxi
