= Pingyao County =

Pingyao 平遥县
- County
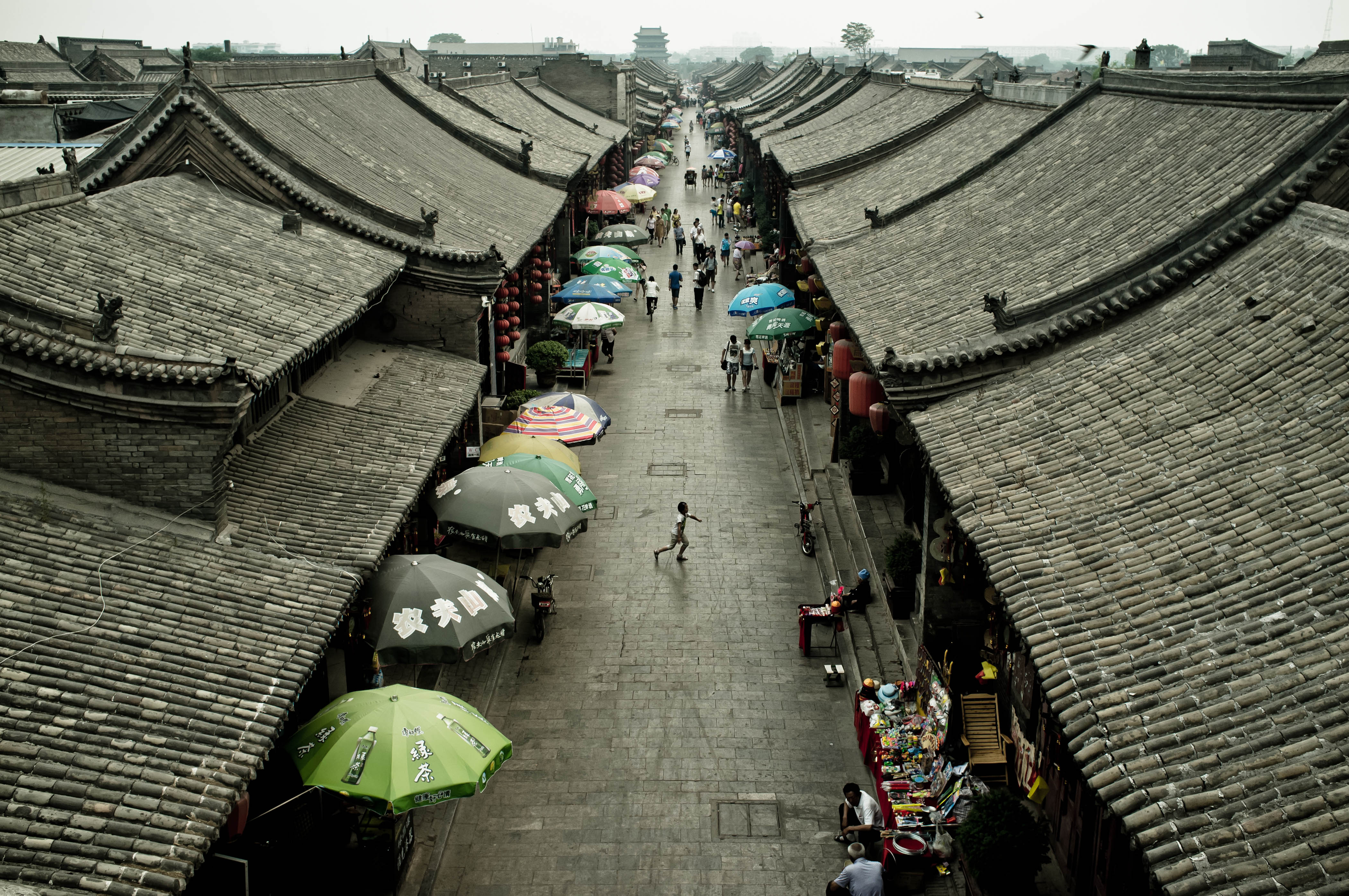
- Pingyao Ancient City

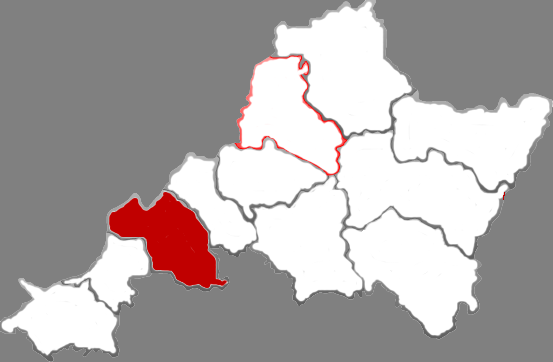
- Pingyao in Jinzhong

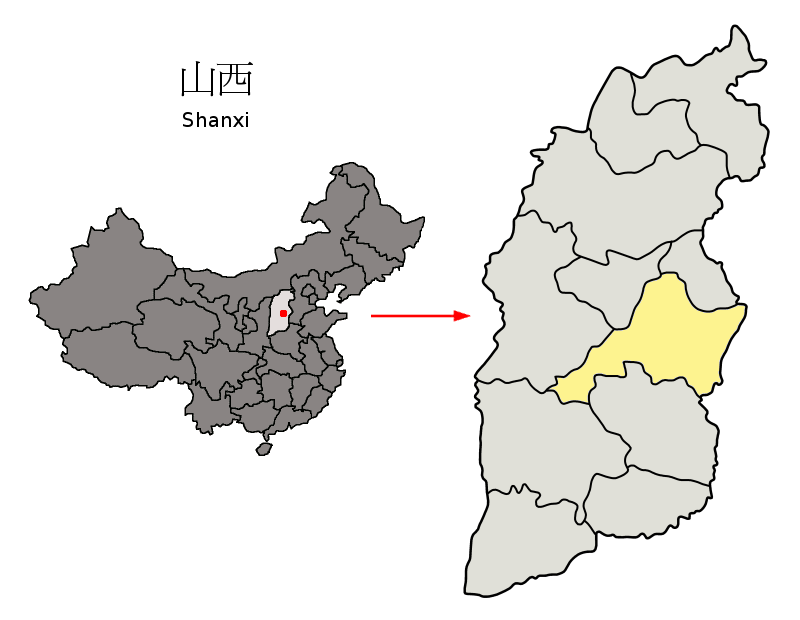
- Jinzhong in Shanxi
- Coordinates: 37°11′23″N 112°10′35″E
- Country: People's Republic of China
- Province: Shanxi
- Prefecture-level city: Jinzhong

Area
  - Total: 1,260 km^{2} (490 sq mi)

Population (2010)
  - Total: 502,712
  - Density: 399/km^{2} (1,030/sq mi)
- Time zone: UTC+8 (China Standard)
- Postal code: 031100
- Area code: 0354
- Website: www.pingyao.gov.cn

Pingyao County
- Traditional Chinese: 平遙縣
- Simplified Chinese: 平遥县
Transcriptions
Standard Mandarin
- Hanyu Pinyin: Píngyáoxiàn
- Wade–Giles: P‘ing-yao Hsien

Pingyao County is a county in Jinzhong in central Shanxi Province, China. It is home to Pingyao Ancient City, a AAAAA-rated tourist attraction, preserving a great deal of architecture from the Ming and Qing dynasties. It spans an area of 1,260 square kilometres (490 mi^{2}), and, as of 2010, it had 502,712 residents.

The county government is seated in Chengxi Subdistrict.

== History ==
Pingyao County is home to Pingyao Ancient City, which has history dating back to approximately 800 BCE.

The area has been incorporated since the Western Han dynasty, when it formed Zhongdu County (simplified Chinese: 中都县; traditional Chinese: 中都縣; pinyin: Zhōngdū Xiàn).

On November 18, 2019, a coal mine operated by Fengyan Group suffered a gas explosion, killing 15 miners and injuring 9 others.

== Geography ==
The Fen River runs through Pingyao County. The county's highest point, Baota Mountain, is approximately 1,895 metres (6,217 ft) above sea level.

Pingyao County is border by Qi County to its east, Wenshui County to its north, Fenyang to its west, Jiexiu to its southwest, Qinyuan County to its south, and both Qin County and Wuxiang County to its southeast.

== Climate ==
Climate data for Pingyao, elevation 780 m (2,560 ft), (1991–2020 normals, extremes 1981–2010)
Month	Jan	Feb	Mar	Apr	May	Jun	Jul	Aug	Sep	Oct	Nov	Dec	Year
Record high °C (°F)	13.6 (56.5)	22.2 (72.0)	29.3 (84.7)	37.3 (99.1)	38.0 (100.4)	41.1 (106.0)	39.6 (103.3)	37.7 (99.9)	37.5 (99.5)	30.3 (86.5)	24.3 (75.7)	17.5 (63.5)	41.1 (106.0)
Mean daily maximum °C (°F)	2.8 (37.0)	7.3 (45.1)	14.0 (57.2)	21.4 (70.5)	26.9 (80.4)	30.4 (86.7)	31.0 (87.8)	29.1 (84.4)	24.5 (76.1)	18.5 (65.3)	10.7 (51.3)	3.9 (39.0)	18.4 (65.1)
Daily mean °C (°F)	−4.4 (24.1)	−0.5 (31.1)	6.3 (43.3)	13.5 (56.3)	19.3 (66.7)	23.2 (73.8)	24.7 (76.5)	22.8 (73.0)	17.5 (63.5)	11.0 (51.8)	3.6 (38.5)	−2.6 (27.3)	11.2 (52.2)
Mean daily minimum °C (°F)	−9.9 (14.2)	−6.4 (20.5)	−0.3 (31.5)	6.0 (42.8)	11.5 (52.7)	16.2 (61.2)	19.2 (66.6)	17.6 (63.7)	12.0 (53.6)	5.3 (41.5)	−1.7 (28.9)	−7.6 (18.3)	5.2 (41.3)
Record low °C (°F)	−22.4 (−8.3)	−24.1 (−11.4)	−13.2 (8.2)	−8.5 (16.7)	−1.9 (28.6)	5.3 (41.5)	11.3 (52.3)	8.3 (46.9)	−0.7 (30.7)	−8.0 (17.6)	−21.9 (−7.4)	−22.1 (−7.8)	−24.1 (−11.4)
Average precipitation mm (inches)	2.2 (0.09)	4.3 (0.17)	9.3 (0.37)	26.1 (1.03)	30.2 (1.19)	42.4 (1.67)	97.6 (3.84)	90.9 (3.58)	58.5 (2.30)	32.4 (1.28)	11.8 (0.46)	2.4 (0.09)	408.1 (16.07)
Average precipitation days (≥ 0.1 mm)	2.3	2.6	3.6	5.3	6.2	9.1	11.3	10.2	8.1	6.2	3.7	1.6	70.2
Average snowy days	3.0	3.6	2.1	0.6	0	0	0	0	0	0.1	1.9	2.7	14
Average relative humidity (%)	52	49	46	47	47	55	68	73	72	67	60	53	57
Mean monthly sunshine hours	149.2	166.8	201.9	226.0	248.3	224.9	213.0	199.7	177.3	180.4	161.3	150.5	2,299.3
Percentage possible sunshine	48	54	54	57	56	51	48	48	48	53	53	51	52
Source: China Meteorological Administration

== Administrative divisions ==
Pingyao County administers three subdistricts, five towns and nine townships.

Subdistricts
English name	Chinese name
Gucheng Subdistrict	Chinese: 古城街道; pinyin: Gǔchéng Jiēdào
Chengdong Subdistrict	simplified Chinese: 城东街道; traditional Chinese: 城東街道; pinyin: Chéngdōng Jiēdào
Chengxi Subdistrict	Chinese: 城西街道; pinyin: Chéngxī Jiēdào
Towns
Gutao	simplified Chinese: 古陶镇; traditional Chinese: 古陶鎮; pinyin: Gǔtáo Zhèn
Duancun	simplified Chinese: 段村镇; traditional Chinese: 段村鎮; pinyin: Duàncūn Zhèn
Dongquan	simplified Chinese: 东泉镇; traditional Chinese: 東泉鎮; pinyin: Dōngquán Zhèn
Hongshan	simplified Chinese: 洪善镇; traditional Chinese: 洪善鎮; pinyin: Hóngshàn Zhèn
Ninggu	simplified Chinese: 宁固镇; traditional Chinese: 寧固鎮; pinyin: Nínggù Zhèn
Townships
Nanzheng Township	simplified Chinese: 南政乡; traditional Chinese: 南政鄉; pinyin: Nánzhèng Xiāng
Zhongdu Township	simplified Chinese: 中都乡; traditional Chinese: 中都鄉; pinyin: Zhōngdū Xiāng
Yuebi Township	simplified Chinese: 岳壁乡; traditional Chinese: 岳壁鄉; pinyin: Yuèbì Xiāng
Buyi Township	simplified Chinese: 卜宜乡; traditional Chinese: 卜宜鄉; pinyin: Bǔyí Xiāng
Mengshan Township	simplified Chinese: 孟山乡; traditional Chinese: 孟山鄉; pinyin: Mèngshān Xiāng
Zhukeng Township	simplified Chinese: 朱坑乡; traditional Chinese: 朱坑鄉; pinyin: Zhūkēng Xiāng
Xiangyuan Township	simplified Chinese: 襄垣乡; traditional Chinese: 襄垣鄉; pinyin: Xiāngyuán Xiāng
Dujiazhuang Township	simplified Chinese: 杜家庄乡; traditional Chinese: 杜家莊鄉; pinyin: Dùjiāzhuāng Xiāng
Xiangle Township	simplified Chinese: 香乐乡; traditional Chinese: 香樂鄉; pinyin: Xiānglè Xiāng

== Economy ==
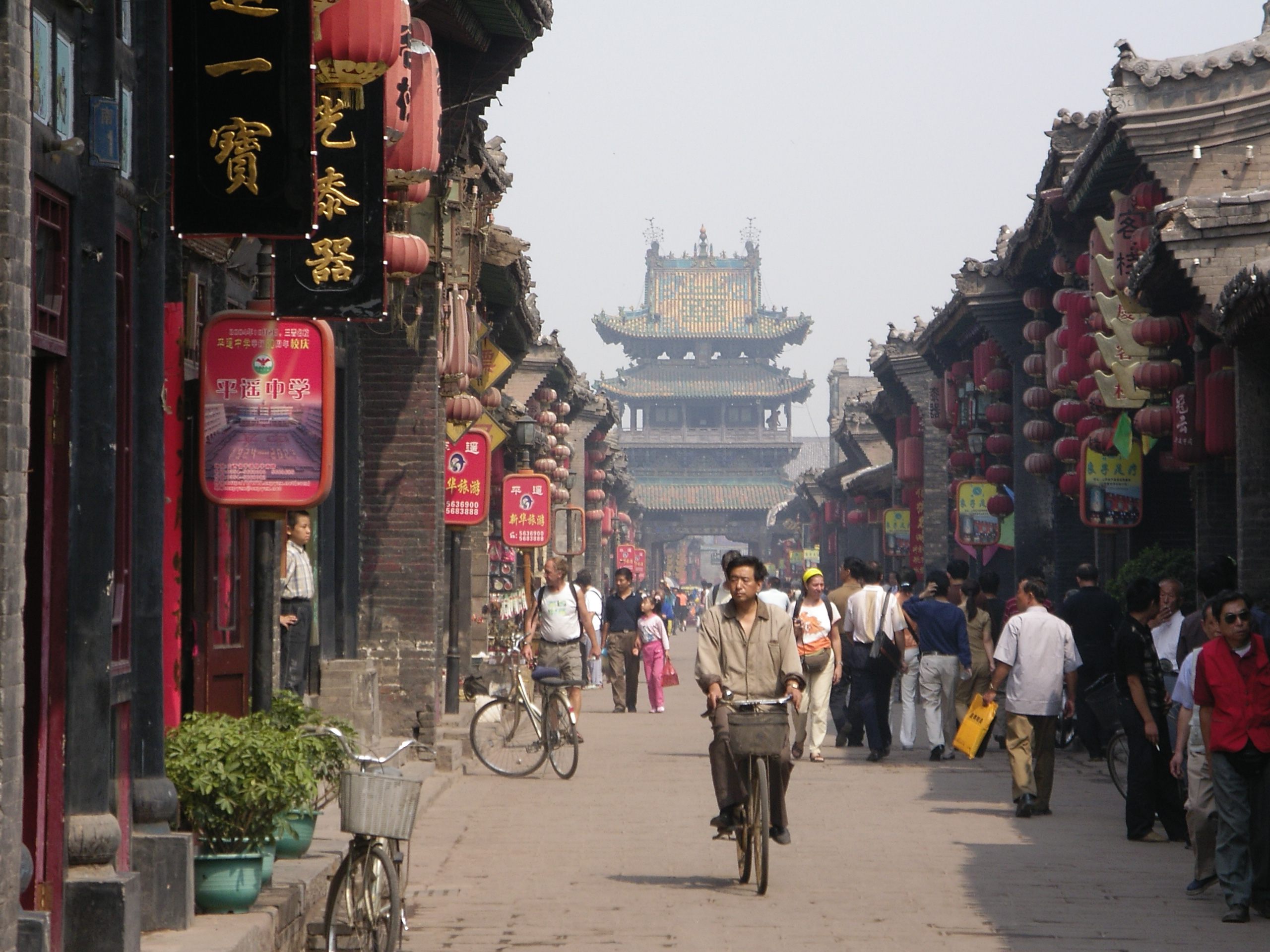
A street in Pingyao

As of 2018, the Pingyao County's GDP totaled ¥11.869 billion, a 7.5% increase from the previous year. The county's consumer retail sales totaled ¥6.801 billion, an 8.4% increase from the previous year, and its public budget revenue totaled ¥665 million, an increase of 35.7% from the previous year.

10.2% of Pingyao County's output came from its primary sector, 33.0% came from its secondary sector, and 56.8% came from its tertiary sector.

=== Agriculture ===
In 2018, the county produced 260,000 tons of grain, 570,000 tons of vegetables, and 190,000 tons of meat, eggs, and milk. The county grew 2,000 hectares (4,900 acres) of corn, 1,000 hectares (2,500 acres) mu of Chinese medicine ingredients, and sizable amounts of other grains, fruits, and vegetables.

=== Industry ===
Major industrial entities with operations in Pingyao County include the China Iron & Steel Research Institute Group, Huawei, Pingyao Beer, Higrand Biotech, Hesteel Group, Shanxi Liangyu Carbon, and Fengyan Group.

=== Tourism ===
In 2018, Pingyao County received 15,486,700 tourists. The same year, the China Cultural Fair included it in its list of "China's Most Beautiful Counties".

== Transportation ==
The Datong–Puzhou railway and the Datong–Xi'an high-speed railway both run through the county.

National Highway 108 and the Datong-Yuncheng Expressway also run through the county.

== See also ==
- List of counties in Shanxi
- Pingyao Ancient City
