= Yuanqu County =

Yuanqu County 垣曲县 Yuanku; Yüanku
- County
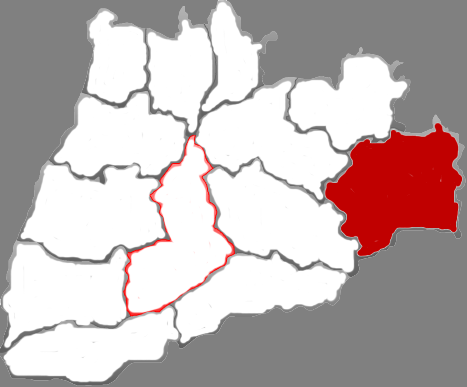
- Location in Yuncheng

- Location of the seat in Shanxi
- Coordinates: 35°17′38″N 111°40′24″E
- Country: People's Republic of China
- Province: Shanxi
- Prefecture-level city: Yuncheng
- Time zone: UTC+8 (China Standard)
- Website: www.yuanqu.gov.cn

Yuanqu County
- Traditional Chinese: 垣曲縣
- Simplified Chinese: 垣曲县
Transcriptions
Standard Mandarin
- Hanyu Pinyin: Yuánqǔ Xiàn
- Wade–Giles: Yüan-ch‘ü Hsien

Yuanqu County is a county in Yuncheng City, in the south of Shanxi province, China, bordering Henan province to the southeast and south. It is the easternmost county-level division of Yuncheng.

== Climate ==
Climate data for Yuanqu, elevation 505 m (1,657 ft), (1991–2020 normals, extremes 1981–2010)
Month	Jan	Feb	Mar	Apr	May	Jun	Jul	Aug	Sep	Oct	Nov	Dec	Year
Record high °C (°F)	18.1 (64.6)	22.4 (72.3)	29.5 (85.1)	37.9 (100.2)	39.6 (103.3)	40.3 (104.5)	40.5 (104.9)	39.4 (102.9)	38.3 (100.9)	31.8 (89.2)	26.9 (80.4)	20.3 (68.5)	40.5 (104.9)
Mean daily maximum °C (°F)	5.0 (41.0)	8.7 (47.7)	14.8 (58.6)	21.7 (71.1)	26.6 (79.9)	30.8 (87.4)	31.1 (88.0)	29.4 (84.9)	25.1 (77.2)	19.7 (67.5)	12.9 (55.2)	6.7 (44.1)	19.4 (66.9)
Daily mean °C (°F)	−0.3 (31.5)	2.8 (37.0)	8.2 (46.8)	14.8 (58.6)	19.9 (67.8)	24.3 (75.7)	25.8 (78.4)	24.3 (75.7)	19.5 (67.1)	13.7 (56.7)	7.2 (45.0)	1.6 (34.9)	13.5 (56.3)
Mean daily minimum °C (°F)	−4.4 (24.1)	−1.7 (28.9)	2.9 (37.2)	8.6 (47.5)	13.6 (56.5)	18.3 (64.9)	21.5 (70.7)	20.5 (68.9)	15.3 (59.5)	9.2 (48.6)	2.8 (37.0)	−2.4 (27.7)	8.7 (47.6)
Record low °C (°F)	−14.2 (6.4)	−13.7 (7.3)	−7.6 (18.3)	−2.0 (28.4)	3.4 (38.1)	9.9 (49.8)	13.4 (56.1)	11.6 (52.9)	5.4 (41.7)	−1.6 (29.1)	−8.8 (16.2)	−12.3 (9.9)	−14.2 (6.4)
Average precipitation mm (inches)	9.4 (0.37)	12.6 (0.50)	18.1 (0.71)	41.7 (1.64)	53.2 (2.09)	62.4 (2.46)	142.2 (5.60)	105.8 (4.17)	89.9 (3.54)	50.6 (1.99)	23.1 (0.91)	6.4 (0.25)	615.4 (24.23)
Average precipitation days (≥ 0.1 mm)	3.9	4.5	5.1	6.6	7.4	8.4	11.3	11.1	10.6	7.4	5.1	3.1	84.5
Average snowy days	4.6	3.9	1.8	0.3	0	0	0	0	0	0	1.6	2.8	15
Average relative humidity (%)	50	53	54	57	59	62	76	79	76	69	61	50	62
Mean monthly sunshine hours	153	147.1	176.1	203.6	220.2	205.9	174.7	169.8	147.8	156.6	155.8	159.5	2,070.1
Percentage possible sunshine	49	47	47	52	51	47	40	41	40	45	51	53	47
Source: China Meteorological Administration
