= Shouyang County =

Coordinates: 37°53′28″N 113°10′27″E

Shouyang 寿阳县 Showyang
- County
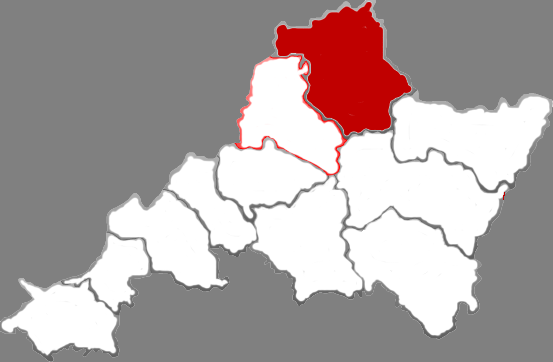
- Shouyang in Jinzhong

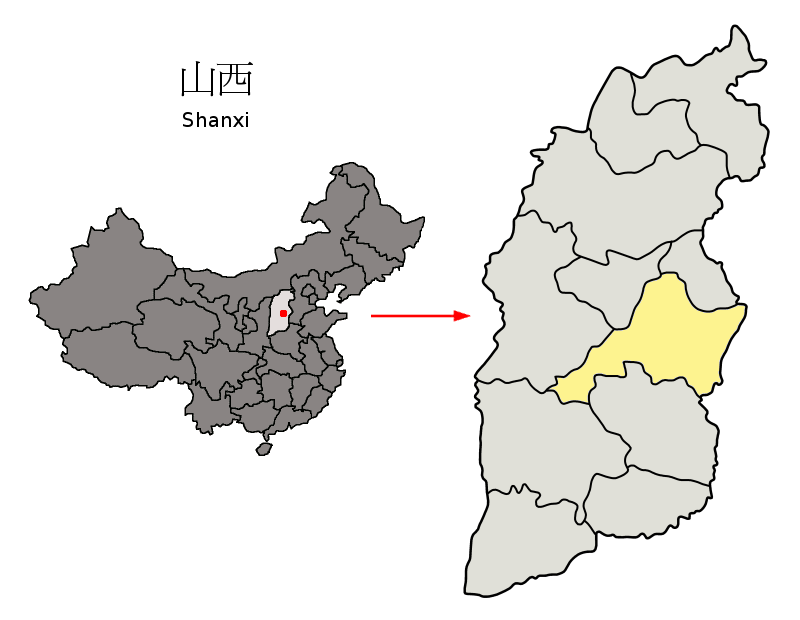
- Jinzhong in Shanxi
- Country: People's Republic of China
- Province: Shanxi
- Prefecture-level city: Jinzhong
- Time zone: UTC+8 (China Standard)

Shouyang County (simplified Chinese: 寿阳县; traditional Chinese: 壽陽縣; pinyin: Shòuyáng Xiàn) is a county in Jinzhong, Shanxi province, China.

== Climate ==
Climate data for Shouyang, elevation 1,066 m (3,497 ft), (1991–2020 normals, extremes 1981–2010)
Month	Jan	Feb	Mar	Apr	May	Jun	Jul	Aug	Sep	Oct	Nov	Dec	Year
Record high °C (°F)	14.1 (57.4)	18.1 (64.6)	26.1 (79.0)	34.5 (94.1)	34.6 (94.3)	39.7 (103.5)	37.9 (100.2)	33.7 (92.7)	34.1 (93.4)	27.5 (81.5)	21.7 (71.1)	14.5 (58.1)	39.7 (103.5)
Mean daily maximum °C (°F)	0.7 (33.3)	4.4 (39.9)	10.8 (51.4)	18.1 (64.6)	23.7 (74.7)	27.3 (81.1)	28.1 (82.6)	26.5 (79.7)	22.1 (71.8)	16.3 (61.3)	8.5 (47.3)	2.0 (35.6)	15.7 (60.3)
Daily mean °C (°F)	−7.8 (18.0)	−4.0 (24.8)	2.5 (36.5)	10.0 (50.0)	16.1 (61.0)	20.1 (68.2)	21.8 (71.2)	20.2 (68.4)	14.9 (58.8)	8.2 (46.8)	0.5 (32.9)	−5.9 (21.4)	8.1 (46.5)
Mean daily minimum °C (°F)	−14.0 (6.8)	−10.3 (13.5)	−4.2 (24.4)	2.6 (36.7)	8.5 (47.3)	13.4 (56.1)	16.9 (62.4)	15.5 (59.9)	9.5 (49.1)	2.3 (36.1)	−5.0 (23.0)	−11.5 (11.3)	2.0 (35.6)
Record low °C (°F)	−25.7 (−14.3)	−23.7 (−10.7)	−17.4 (0.7)	−10.3 (13.5)	−2.8 (27.0)	4.2 (39.6)	9.3 (48.7)	5.6 (42.1)	−2.3 (27.9)	−9.4 (15.1)	−21.7 (−7.1)	−25.1 (−13.2)	−25.7 (−14.3)
Average precipitation mm (inches)	3.2 (0.13)	5.0 (0.20)	10.7 (0.42)	25.6 (1.01)	40.1 (1.58)	55.9 (2.20)	119.8 (4.72)	107.5 (4.23)	61.2 (2.41)	34.2 (1.35)	12.8 (0.50)	2.4 (0.09)	478.4 (18.84)
Average precipitation days (≥ 0.1 mm)	2.4	2.9	4.0	6.0	7.2	10.7	13.8	11.7	8.8	6.4	3.7	2.0	79.6
Average snowy days	3.6	4.1	3.7	1.6	0	0	0	0	0	0.3	2.9	3.0	19.2
Average relative humidity (%)	53	51	47	49	52	62	76	79	76	68	61	54	61
Mean monthly sunshine hours	185.3	180.8	214.4	234.6	260.4	227.1	210.9	204.6	190.6	197.9	183.2	184.0	2,473.8
Percentage possible sunshine	60	59	58	59	59	51	47	49	52	58	61	62	56
Source: China Meteorological Administration
