= Datong Mass Grave Memorial =

Chinese coal mine pit mass grave

- 大同煤矿万人坑 (Chinese)
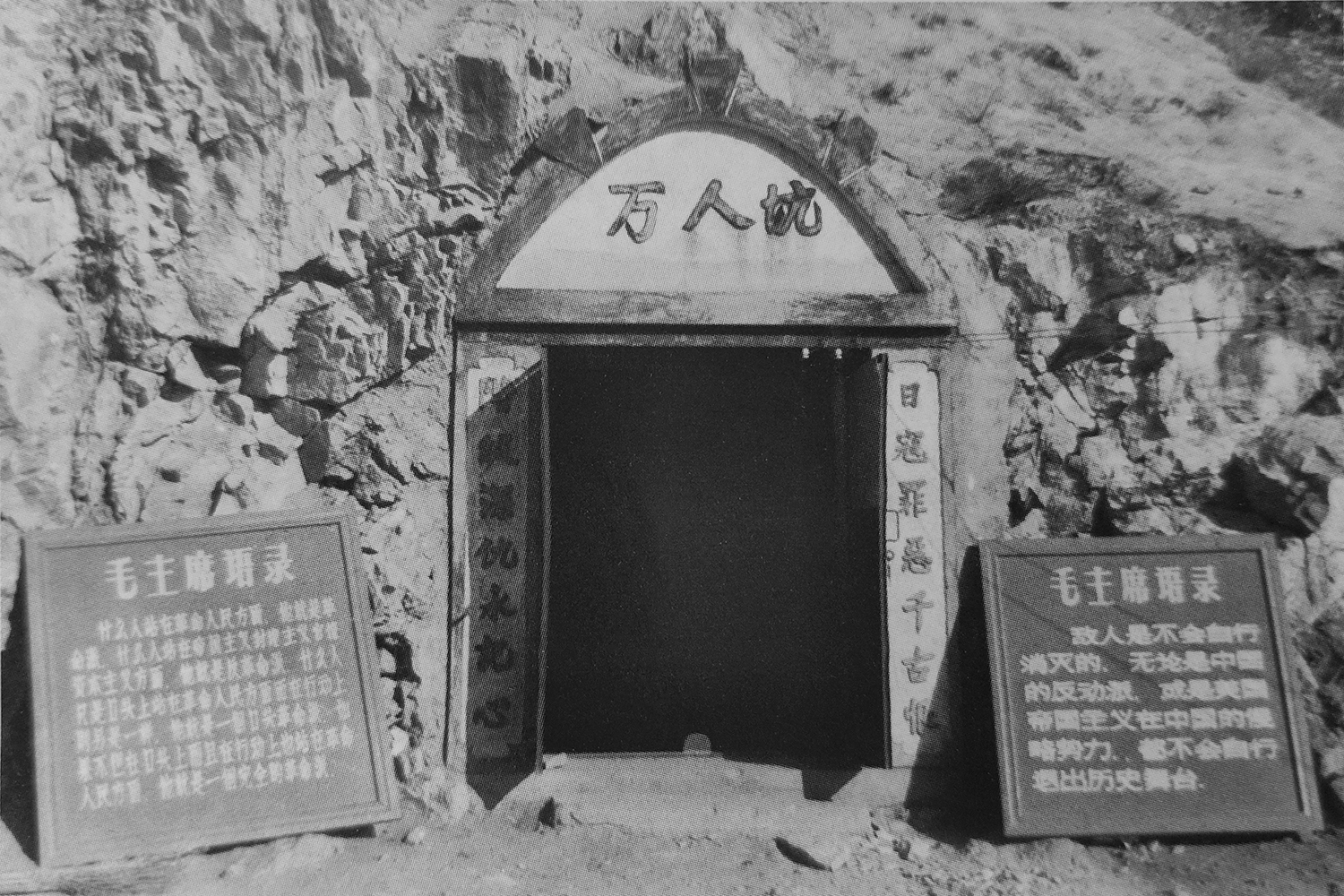
- Entrance to the mass grave photographed in December 1966
- Interactive map of Datong Mass Grave Memorial
- 40°01′30″N 113°07′55″E
- Type: Mass grave
- Location: Datong, Shanxi Province, People's Republic of China

The Datong Mass Grave Memorial (Chinese: 大同煤矿万人坑, lit. Datong coal mine pit of ten thousand people) is a mass grave from the time of the Second Sino-Japanese War. It is located in a former coal mine in the city of Datong in the province of Shanxi.

According to historian Li Jinwen, more than 155,000 Chinese laborers are buried in unused coal mines around Datong. During the war, the Japanese occupiers wanted to extract the coal around Datong for their war effort. Chinese laborers were made to work in the mine for extended hours without protective equipment. The miners were plagued by injuries, malnutrition, and diseases. When people succumbed and died, their bodies were disposed of in unused mineshafts. The Japanese even buried alive miners who could no longer work. The artist Wang Youshan depicted the events in his art installation, Washing: 1941, Datong, Ten Thousand Men in Ditch.

The mass graves were first uncovered in the 1960s. The pits were first open to the public in 1969. In 2006, construction began on a memorial hall, which opened to the public in 2010. The memorial features a museum of 337,000 square meters, recounting the atrocities faced by Datong coal miners. Along with the memorial to the miners, the museum also depicts the history of coal mining in Datong.
