= Linyi County, Shanxi =

Linyi County 临猗县
- County
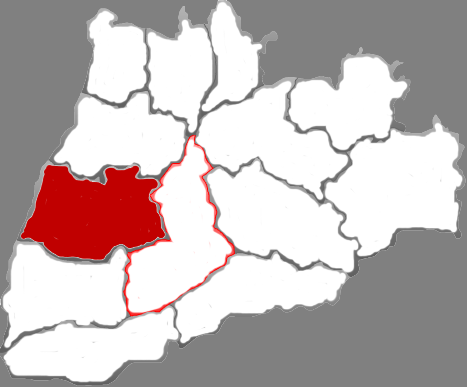
- Location in Yuncheng

- Location of the seat in Shanxi
- Coordinates: 35°08′39″N 110°46′28″E
- Country: People's Republic of China
- Province: Shanxi
- Prefecture-level city: Yuncheng

Population (2020)
  - Total: 482,559
- Time zone: UTC+8 (China Standard)
- Website: www.sxly.gov.cn

Linyi County (simplified Chinese: 临猗县; traditional Chinese: 臨猗縣; pinyin: Línyī Xiàn) is a county in the southwest of Shanxi province, China, bordering Shaanxi province to the west. It is under the administration of Yuncheng city.

== Climate ==
Climate data for Linyi, elevation 436 m (1,430 ft), (1991–2020 normals, extremes 1981–2010)
Month	Jan	Feb	Mar	Apr	May	Jun	Jul	Aug	Sep	Oct	Nov	Dec	Year
Record high °C (°F)	14.3 (57.7)	22.0 (71.6)	28.9 (84.0)	38.2 (100.8)	39.1 (102.4)	41.4 (106.5)	40.7 (105.3)	38.7 (101.7)	39.0 (102.2)	31.5 (88.7)	25.0 (77.0)	17.0 (62.6)	41.4 (106.5)
Mean daily maximum °C (°F)	5.4 (41.7)	10.0 (50.0)	16.2 (61.2)	22.8 (73.0)	27.6 (81.7)	31.9 (89.4)	32.7 (90.9)	30.9 (87.6)	26.3 (79.3)	20.4 (68.7)	13.2 (55.8)	6.8 (44.2)	20.4 (68.6)
Daily mean °C (°F)	−0.7 (30.7)	3.4 (38.1)	9.3 (48.7)	15.8 (60.4)	20.9 (69.6)	25.6 (78.1)	27.2 (81.0)	25.5 (77.9)	20.5 (68.9)	14.1 (57.4)	6.7 (44.1)	0.6 (33.1)	14.1 (57.3)
Mean daily minimum °C (°F)	−5.4 (22.3)	−1.7 (28.9)	3.7 (38.7)	9.5 (49.1)	14.5 (58.1)	19.5 (67.1)	22.4 (72.3)	21.1 (70.0)	16.0 (60.8)	9.2 (48.6)	1.8 (35.2)	−4.0 (24.8)	8.9 (48.0)
Record low °C (°F)	−15.7 (3.7)	−12.4 (9.7)	−9.1 (15.6)	−2.2 (28.0)	5.3 (41.5)	9.6 (49.3)	16.1 (61.0)	12.5 (54.5)	3.5 (38.3)	−5.7 (21.7)	−10.6 (12.9)	−14.8 (5.4)	−15.7 (3.7)
Average precipitation mm (inches)	4.8 (0.19)	8.1 (0.32)	14.3 (0.56)	31.7 (1.25)	47.2 (1.86)	52.6 (2.07)	81.8 (3.22)	76.8 (3.02)	76.1 (3.00)	47.8 (1.88)	18.5 (0.73)	3.5 (0.14)	463.2 (18.24)
Average precipitation days (≥ 0.1 mm)	2.7	3.0	3.9	5.8	7.0	7.1	8.5	8.9	9.3	7.7	5.2	2.3	71.4
Average snowy days	3.3	2.6	1.1	0	0	0	0	0	0	0	1.2	2.0	10.2
Average relative humidity (%)	55	54	54	57	58	59	71	74	74	72	68	58	63
Mean monthly sunshine hours	133.9	139.3	179.0	214.7	233.7	223.8	230.7	209.5	162.2	156.8	141.4	139.8	2,164.8
Percentage possible sunshine	43	45	48	54	54	52	52	51	44	45	46	46	48
Source: China Meteorological Administration

== Transport ==
Linyi is situated about 22 km from Yuncheng city. It has a regular bus service connecting Yuncheng city and Yuncheng North station. The G209 road connects Linyi and Yuncheng.

== Education ==
There are several key schools in Linyi county which serve the county and surrounding towns and villages. Yuncheng University is 12 km away from Linyi county.
