= Yuncheng =

Yuncheng 运城市
- Prefecture-level city
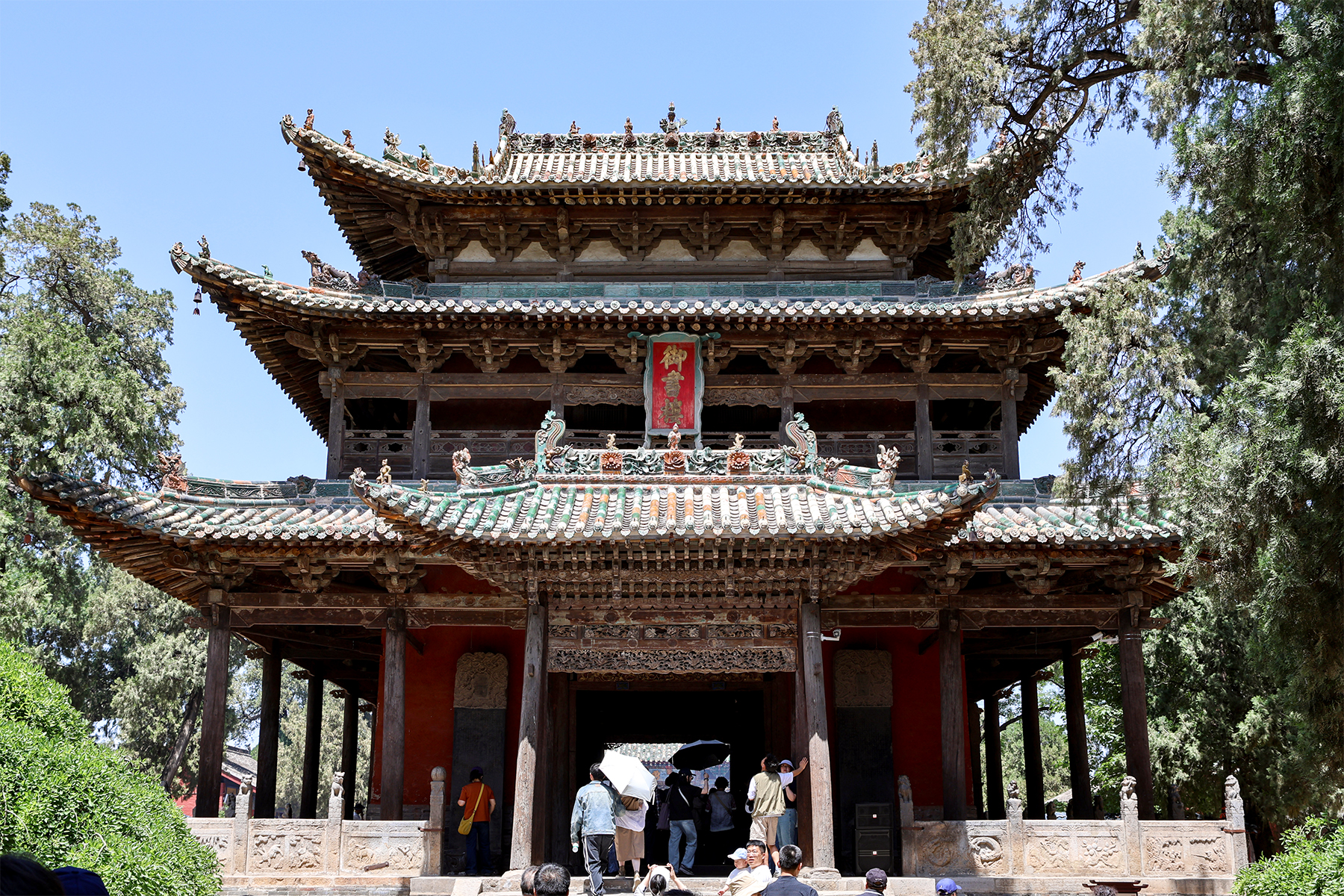
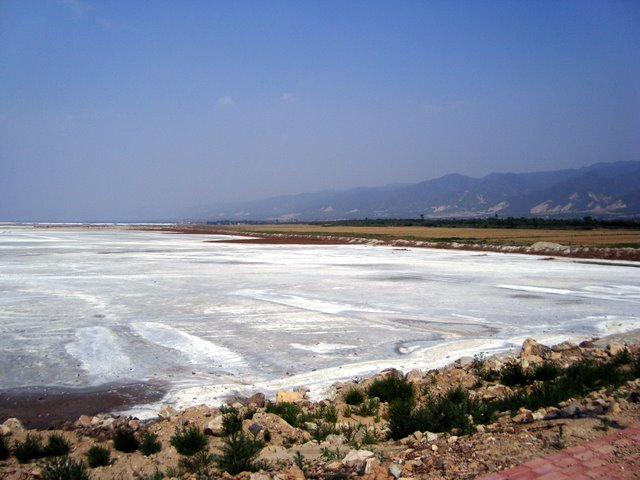
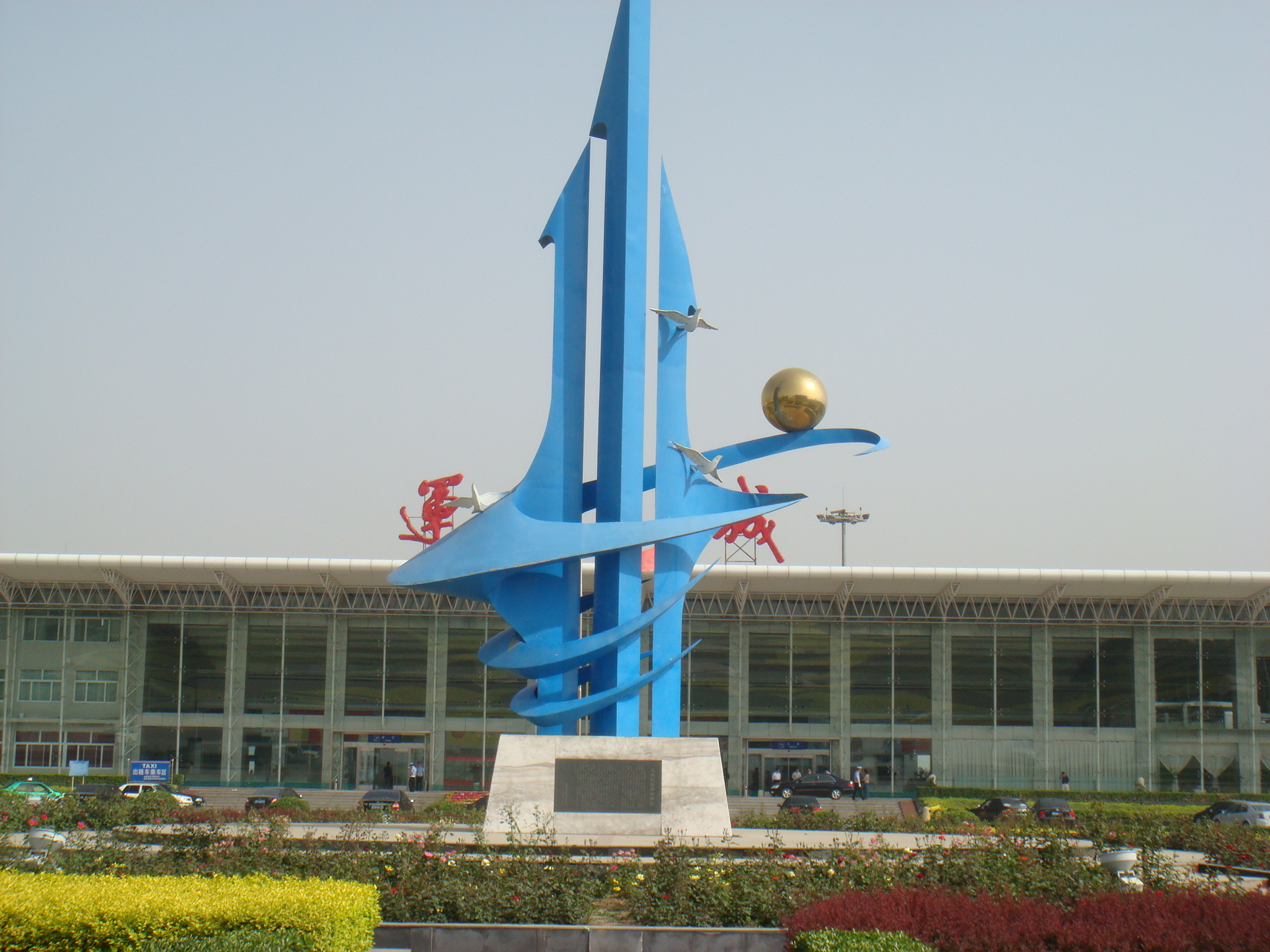
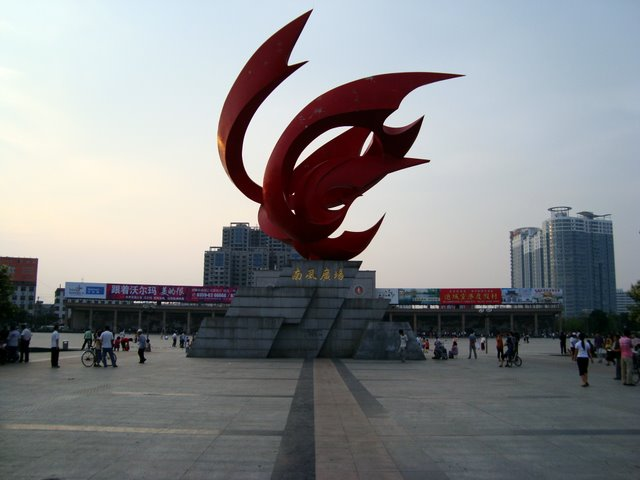
- Top to bottom, left to right: Haizhou Emperor Guan Temple, Yuncheng Salt Lake, Yuncheng Airport, Nanfeng Plaza

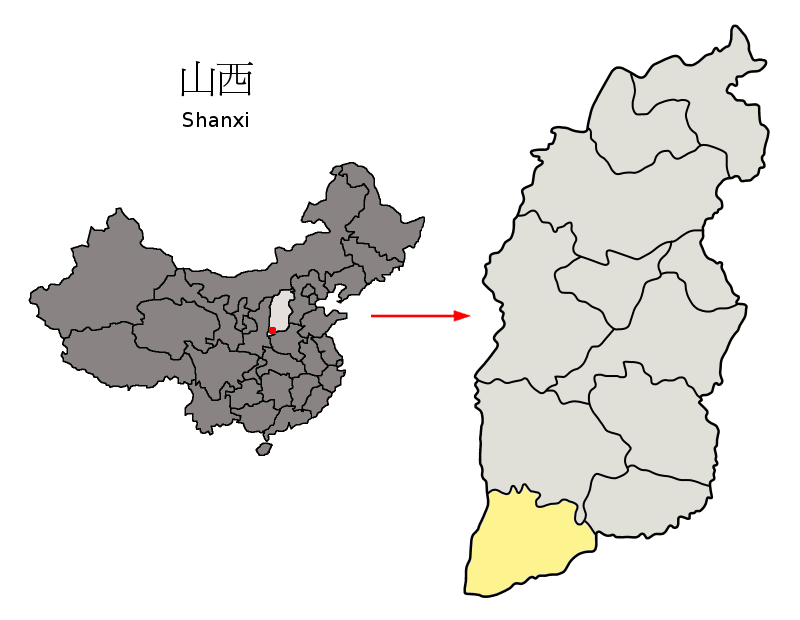
- Location of Yuncheng City jurisdiction in Shanxi

- Location of the city center in Shanxi Yuncheng (Eastern China) Yuncheng (China)
- Coordinates (Yulin municipal government): 35°01′36″N 111°00′25″E
- Country: People's Republic of China
- Province: Shanxi
- County-level divisions: 13
- Municipal seat: Yanhu District

Government
  - Type: Prefecture-level city
  - Communist Party Secretary: Wang Yuyan
  - Mayor: Wang Qingxian (王清宪)

Area
  - Prefecture-level city: 14,183 km^{2} (5,476 sq mi)
  - Urban: 1,205 km^{2} (465 sq mi)
  - Metro: 1,205 km^{2} (465 sq mi)
- Elevation: 370 m (1,210 ft)

Population (2020 census)
  - Prefecture-level city: 4,774,508
  - Density: 336.64/km^{2} (871.88/sq mi)
  - Urban: 928,334
  - Urban density: 770.4/km^{2} (1,995/sq mi)
  - Metro: 928,334
  - Metro density: 770.4/km^{2} (1,995/sq mi)

GDP
  - Prefecture-level city: CN¥ 164.4 billion US$ 25.8 billion
  - Per capita: CN¥ 34,425; US$ 5,508
- Time zone: UTC+8 (China Standard)
- Postal code: 044000
- Area code: 0359
- ISO 3166 code: CN-SX-08
- License Plate: 晋M
- Administrative division code: 140800

Yuncheng
- Simplified Chinese: 运城
- Traditional Chinese: 運城
Transcriptions
Standard Mandarin
- Hanyu Pinyin: Yùnchéng
- Wade–Giles: Yün-ch‘êng

Yuncheng (simplified Chinese: 运城; traditional Chinese: 運城) is the southernmost prefecture-level city in Shanxi province, People's Republic of China. It borders Linfen and Jincheng municipalities to the north and east, and Henan (Luoyang and Jiyuan to the east, Sanmenxia to the south) and Shaanxi (Weinan) provinces to the east, south and west, respectively. As of the 2020 census, its population was 4,774,508 inhabitants (5,134,779 in 2010), of whom 928,334 (680,036 in 2010) lived in the built-up (or metro) area made of Yanhu District. One can note than Pinglu County, 205,080 inhabitants in the south, is now part of Sanmenxia built-up (or metro) area.

Yuncheng is a city that was born and prospered from salt. It is named after the "City of Salt Luck". The city is historically associated with the Yuncheng Salt Lake (运城盐湖), one of the largest natural salt lakes in China, which has been exploited for thousands of years and provided a crucial economic foundation for the region. In ancient times, the salt from Yuncheng was an important source of revenue and even influenced regional trade routes, making the city a strategic economic center. Due to its geographical location, Yuncheng also serves as a gateway connecting Shanxi with Henan and Shaanxi, making it an important transportation and cultural hub in the Yellow River basin.

The city is served by Yuncheng Yanhu International Airport, several national highways, and high-speed railway lines, which further strengthen its role as a regional transport node.

== Name ==
Yuncheng was called the "Salt Family" in the Spring and Autumn Period. In the Han Dynasty, the salt city was named "Siyan City". Emperor Taizong of the Yuan Dynasty named Yuncheng Salt Lake "Shenghui Town" because it benefited the world. The city was built at the end of the Yuan Dynasty and was named "Phoenix City" was later renamed "Yuncheng" because of the "City of Salt Luck".

== History ==
Yuncheng is one of the important birthplaces of Chinese civilization. The legendary Chinese ancestors such as Nüwa, Lei Zu, Chi You, Shun, and Yu all were said to have lived here. It is even alleged that Yu established the Xia Dynasty here. During the Warring States Period, the Wei State established its capital here. This marked the beginning of dynastic history in China and laid the foundation for early state formation, making the region not only a political center but also a cultural hub influencing the Central Plains. Anyi, the capital of Wei, is located in Xia County, Yuncheng today.

Hedong Salt Pond is the earliest salt pond developed and utilized in the world, with a mining history of more than 4,600 years. As an important strategic resource, salt ponds were the common goal of various tribes in the Central Plains of China in ancient China. From the ancient legend of the Yellow Emperor's battle with Chiyou, to the historical records of King Mu of Zhou, Emperor Cheng of Han, Emperor Zhang of Han, Emperor Taizong of Tang, Kangxi and other emperors visiting successively, the Hedong Salt Pond has been regarded as a "national treasure" by successive dynasties. The salt pond not only supported the livelihoods of local people, but also served as a financial and military resource for dynasties.

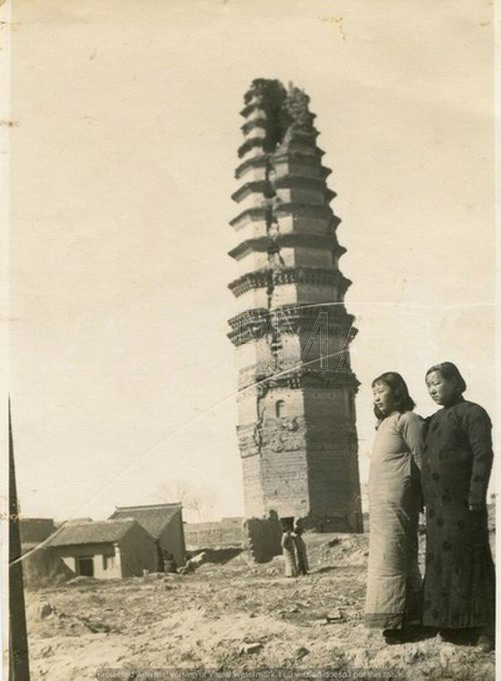
The Taiping Xingguo Temple Pagoda (太平兴国寺塔) in Anyi, Yuncheng, c. 1940s.

In early China, it was the location of the state of Kunwu (昆吾). Yuncheng was the site of the Yuncheng Campaign (三打运城), battle between the Kuomintang army and the People's Liberation Army during Chinese civil war.

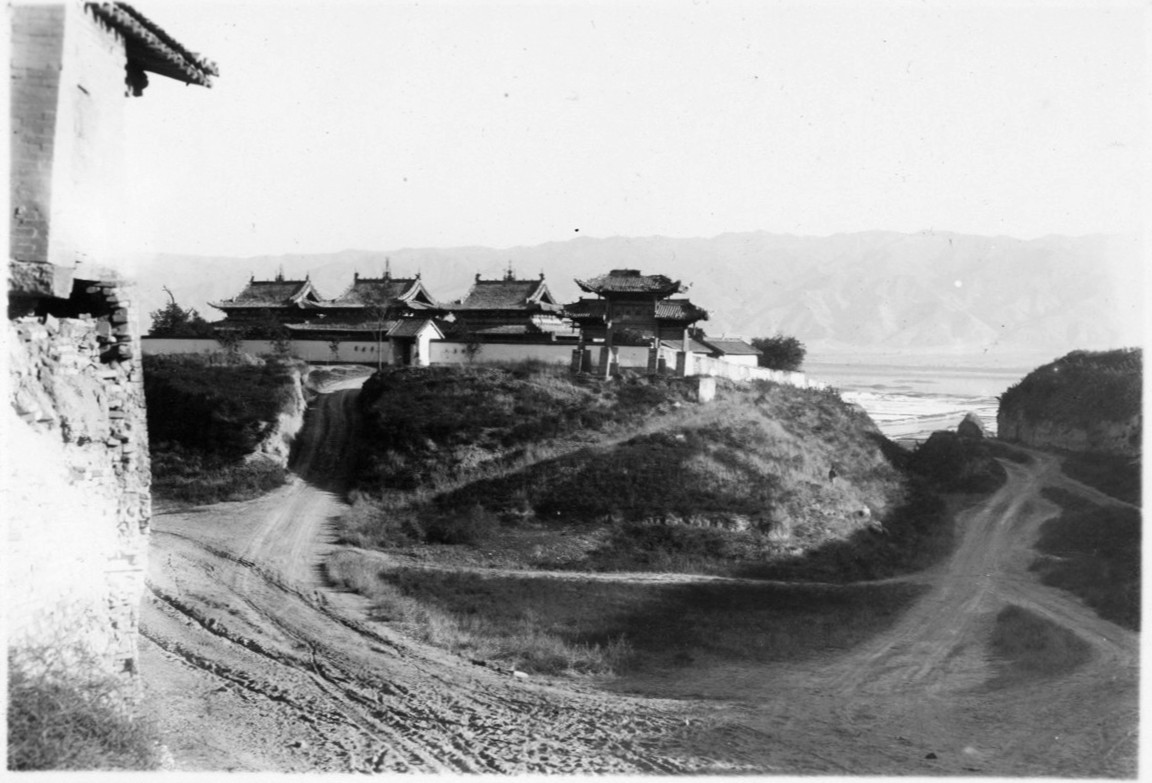
The Salt Lake Temple (盐池神庙), overlooking Yuncheng, c. 1920s–1930s. Visible is the Haiguang Pavilion (海光楼), which was destroyed in 1947.

Yuncheng currently has 6,205 immovable cultural relics, 102 national key cultural relics protection units, and 55 wooden buildings before the Yuan Dynasty.

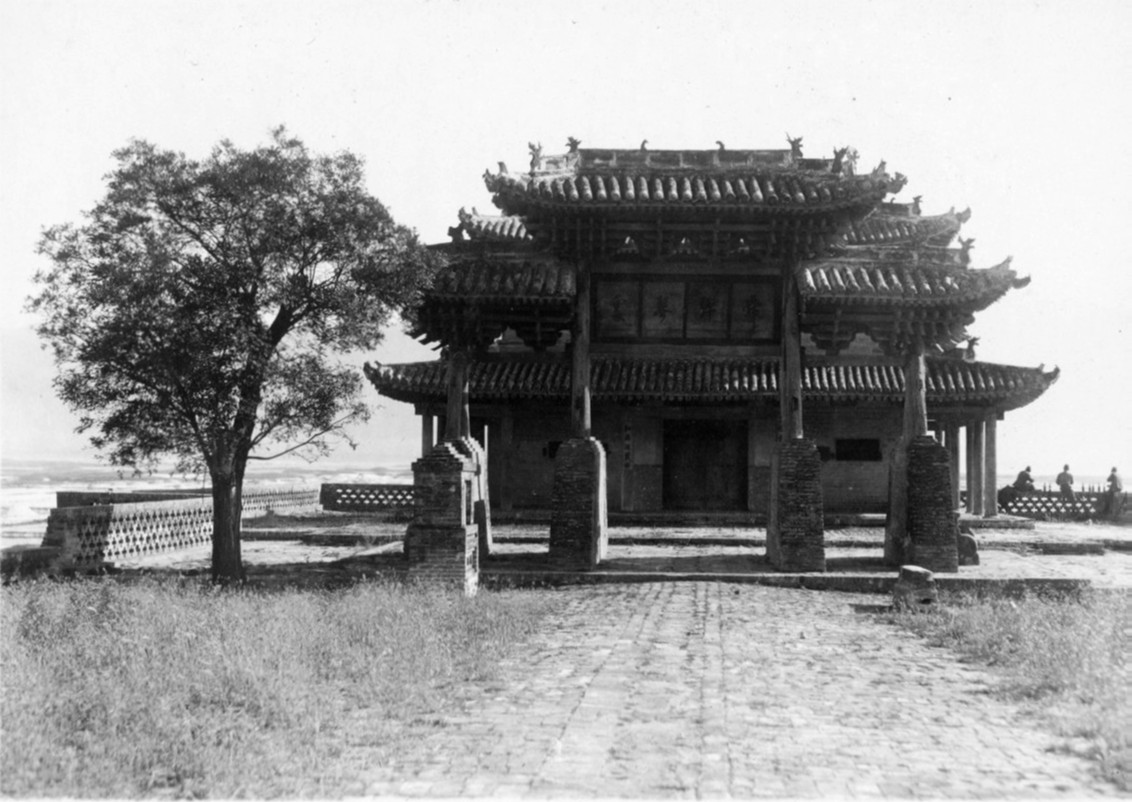
The site traditionally associated with Emperor Shun playing the zither, within the Salt Lake Temple complex on a terrace overlooking Yuncheng Salt Lake, c. 1920s–1930s. According to legend, the sage-king Shun played the five-stringed qin here and composed the "Ode to the South Wind".

== Archaeology ==
In July 2022, archaeologists announced a discovery of a 2.8 cm long 5,200 years old stone carving chrysalis in a semi-crypt house at the Shangguo Site in Wenxi County. Archaeologists made suppositions that this house may have belonged to the Yangshao Culture period, based on the unearthed pottery pieces. According to archaeologist Tian Jianwen, the discovery of stone carving chrysalises provided significant information for the study of the silkworm culture in China.

== Administration ==
Yuncheng is located between 34°35′-35°49′ north latitude. There are 13 county-level administrative divisions under Yuncheng's jurisdiction, including 1 district, 10 counties and 2 county-level cities. The Municipal executive, legislature and judiciary are in Yanhu District, together with the CPC and Public Security Bureau.

Map
Name	Chinese	Hanyu Pinyin	Population (2010)	Area (km^{2})	Density (/km^{2})
Yanhu District	盐湖区	Yánhú Qū	680,036	1,237	501
Yongji City	永济市	Yǒngjì Shì	444,724	1,221	352
Hejin City	河津市	Héjīn Shì	395,527	593	607
Ruicheng County	芮城县	Ruìchéng Xiàn	394,849	1,161	327
Linyi County	临猗县	Línyī Xiàn	572,508	1,350	393
Wanrong County	万荣县	Wànróng Xiàn	439,364	1,037	405
Xinjiang County	新绛县	Xīnjiàng Xiàn	332,473	600	533
Xia County	夏县	Xià Xiàn	352,821	1,328	264
Jishan County	稷山县	Jìshān Xiàn	347,425	680	485
Wenxi County	闻喜县	Wénxǐ Xiàn	404,150	1,160	328
Jiang County	绛县	Jiàng Xiàn	281,643	968	279
Pinglu County	平陆县	Pínglù Xiàn	258,241	1,151	217
Yuanqu County	垣曲县	Yuánqǔ Xiàn	231,018	1,620	136

== Climate ==
Yuncheng has a continental, monsoon-influenced semi-arid climate (Köppen BSk), with four distinct seasons. Due to its southerly location and position to the north of the Zhongtiao Mountains, allowing for downsloping when winds are from the south, it is among the warmest locales in the province. Winters are cold and very dry, while summers are hot and humid. Monthly mean temperatures range from −0.6 °C (30.9 °F) in January to 27.5 °C (81.5 °F) in July, and the annual mean is 14.23 °C (57.6 °F). Over 60% of the annual rainfall occurs from June to September.The average frost-free period across the city is between 188 and 238 days. With monthly percent possible sunshine ranging from 45% in March to 54% in May and July, the city receives 2,219 hours of bright sunshine annually, low by Shanxi standards and North China.

Climate data for Yuncheng (Yanhu District), elevation 375 m (1,230 ft), (1991–2020 normals, extremes 1951–2010)
Month	Jan	Feb	Mar	Apr	May	Jun	Jul	Aug	Sep	Oct	Nov	Dec	Year
Record high °C (°F)	16.4 (61.5)	25.2 (77.4)	29.6 (85.3)	37.6 (99.7)	40.2 (104.4)	42.7 (108.9)	41.4 (106.5)	40.8 (105.4)	40.0 (104.0)	33.2 (91.8)	25.3 (77.5)	17.5 (63.5)	42.7 (108.9)
Mean daily maximum °C (°F)	5.4 (41.7)	10.0 (50.0)	16.4 (61.5)	23.1 (73.6)	28.1 (82.6)	32.3 (90.1)	33.2 (91.8)	31.5 (88.7)	26.7 (80.1)	20.5 (68.9)	13.1 (55.6)	6.6 (43.9)	20.6 (69.0)
Daily mean °C (°F)	−0.6 (30.9)	3.7 (38.7)	9.8 (49.6)	16.4 (61.5)	21.6 (70.9)	26.2 (79.2)	27.8 (82.0)	26.2 (79.2)	21.1 (70.0)	14.6 (58.3)	7.0 (44.6)	0.7 (33.3)	14.5 (58.2)
Mean daily minimum °C (°F)	−5.1 (22.8)	−1.3 (29.7)	4.3 (39.7)	10.2 (50.4)	15.3 (59.5)	20.3 (68.5)	23.2 (73.8)	21.9 (71.4)	16.7 (62.1)	10.0 (50.0)	2.5 (36.5)	−3.7 (25.3)	9.5 (49.1)
Record low °C (°F)	−18.9 (−2.0)	−16.2 (2.8)	−10.8 (12.6)	−5.0 (23.0)	2.9 (37.2)	11.0 (51.8)	15.4 (59.7)	12.3 (54.1)	2.6 (36.7)	−4.9 (23.2)	−11.6 (11.1)	−16.0 (3.2)	−18.9 (−2.0)
Average precipitation mm (inches)	4.9 (0.19)	8.1 (0.32)	14.0 (0.55)	37.4 (1.47)	48.9 (1.93)	54.9 (2.16)	87.7 (3.45)	81.9 (3.22)	81.2 (3.20)	51.9 (2.04)	22.6 (0.89)	3.6 (0.14)	497.1 (19.56)
Average precipitation days (≥ 0.1 mm)	2.9	3.0	4.1	6.4	7.4	7.5	8.7	8.7	9.4	7.4	4.9	2.2	72.6
Average snowy days	3.3	2.4	1.0	0.1	0	0	0	0	0	0	1.2	2.2	10.2
Average relative humidity (%)	55	53	51	53	53	54	64	68	69	69	67	59	60
Mean monthly sunshine hours	131.1	139.1	176.4	210.4	231.4	222.1	221.2	200.8	158.0	144.7	132.8	136.0	2,104
Percentage possible sunshine	42	45	47	53	53	51	50	49	43	42	43	45	47
Source: China Meteorological Administration

== Notable people ==
- Guan Yu, general and deified historical figure
- Guan Hanqing, Dramatist
- Jing Haipeng, PLAAC astronaut
- Zhang Ziyi, Chinese zootechnician
- Gladys Aylward, British missionary who works in the city in the 1930s

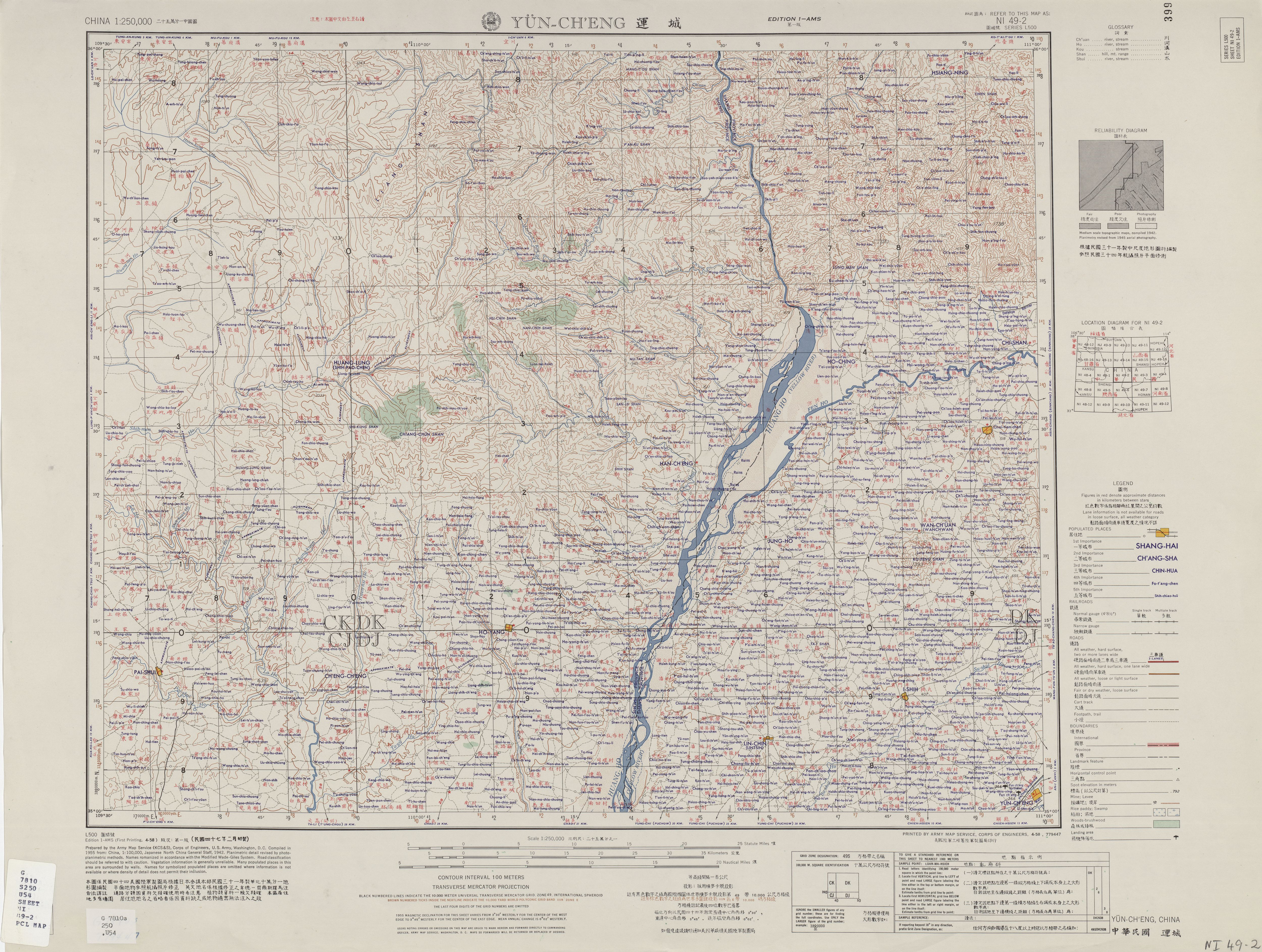
Map including Yuncheng (labeled as YÜN-CH'ENG 運城) (AMS, 1958)

== Transportation ==
- Yuncheng Station Has a maximum daily passenger volume of 14,000
- China National Highway 209
- G59 Hohhot–Beihai Expressway
- Datong–Xi'an Passenger Railway, with frequent service to Beijing, Taiyuan, and Xi'an. Besides the Yuncheng North Railway Station (near Yuncheng's central city), the railway also has stations at Yongji and Wenxi.
- Yuncheng Yanhu International Airport (ICAO: ZBYC, IATA: YCU) is located on Guan Gong West Street in Taocun Town, Yancheng City, Shanxi Province, China.

== See also ==
- Chinese frigate Yuncheng
