= Lingchuan County, Shanxi =

Lingchuan County 陵川县 Lingchwan
- County
- Location of the seat in Shanxi
- Coordinates: 35.67°N 113.31°E
- Country: People's Republic of China
- Province: Shanxi
- Prefecture-level city: Jincheng

Population (2020)
  - Total: 204,825
- Time zone: UTC+8 (China Standard)

Lingchuan County (Chinese: 陵川县; pinyin: Língchuān Xiàn) is a county in the southeast of Shanxi province, China, bordering Henan province to the east and southeast. It is under the administration of Jincheng city.

== Climate ==
Climate data for Lingchuan, elevation 1,312 m (4,304 ft), (1991–2020 normals, extremes 1981–2010)
Month	Jan	Feb	Mar	Apr	May	Jun	Jul	Aug	Sep	Oct	Nov	Dec	Year
Record high °C (°F)	14.4 (57.9)	19.5 (67.1)	25.3 (77.5)	31.8 (89.2)	33.5 (92.3)	33.9 (93.0)	34.4 (93.9)	31.8 (89.2)	32.1 (89.8)	26.5 (79.7)	21.6 (70.9)	15.3 (59.5)	34.4 (93.9)
Mean daily maximum °C (°F)	0.9 (33.6)	4.0 (39.2)	9.7 (49.5)	16.6 (61.9)	21.6 (70.9)	25.2 (77.4)	26.2 (79.2)	24.8 (76.6)	20.6 (69.1)	15.1 (59.2)	8.5 (47.3)	2.3 (36.1)	14.6 (58.3)
Daily mean °C (°F)	−4.8 (23.4)	−1.8 (28.8)	3.5 (38.3)	10.3 (50.5)	15.7 (60.3)	19.6 (67.3)	21.2 (70.2)	19.8 (67.6)	15.3 (59.5)	9.5 (49.1)	2.9 (37.2)	−3.1 (26.4)	9.0 (48.2)
Mean daily minimum °C (°F)	−8.8 (16.2)	−5.8 (21.6)	−1.1 (30.0)	4.8 (40.6)	10.2 (50.4)	14.4 (57.9)	17.1 (62.8)	15.9 (60.6)	11.0 (51.8)	5.1 (41.2)	−1.3 (29.7)	−7.0 (19.4)	4.5 (40.2)
Record low °C (°F)	−20.9 (−5.6)	−18.7 (−1.7)	−13.6 (7.5)	−6.4 (20.5)	0.9 (33.6)	6.7 (44.1)	11.3 (52.3)	7.2 (45.0)	1.6 (34.9)	−6.3 (20.7)	−17.1 (1.2)	−21.4 (−6.5)	−21.4 (−6.5)
Average precipitation mm (inches)	5.7 (0.22)	10.6 (0.42)	13.0 (0.51)	32.1 (1.26)	54.9 (2.16)	77.6 (3.06)	143.0 (5.63)	121.5 (4.78)	74.8 (2.94)	33.8 (1.33)	18.2 (0.72)	5.5 (0.22)	590.7 (23.25)
Average precipitation days (≥ 0.1 mm)	4.0	4.6	5.2	6.4	8.1	10.9	14.2	12.8	10.7	7.1	5.1	3.7	92.8
Average snowy days	5.7	7.0	5.8	1.3	0.1	0	0	0	0	0.5	3.3	5.2	28.9
Average relative humidity (%)	54	56	53	54	56	64	77	79	74	66	59	53	62
Mean monthly sunshine hours	187.5	180.7	211.4	240.2	260.1	231.6	211.4	203.0	184.8	196.5	188.8	193.6	2,489.6
Percentage possible sunshine	60	58	57	61	60	53	48	49	50	57	62	64	57
Source: China Meteorological Administration
