= Jiang County =

Jiang County 绛县
- County
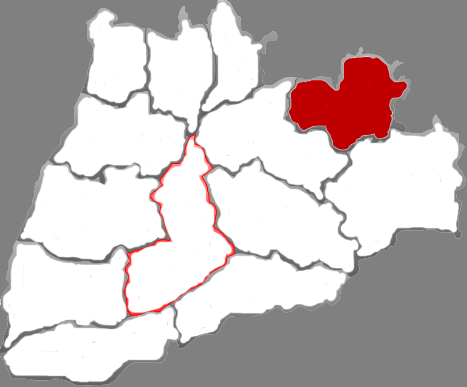
- Location in Yuncheng

- Location of the seat in Shanxi
- Coordinates: 35°29′03″N 111°37′41″E
- Country: People's Republic of China
- Province: Shanxi
- Prefecture-level city: Yuncheng
- Time zone: UTC+8 (China Standard)
- Website: www.jiangxian.gov.cn

Jiang County or Jiangxian (simplified Chinese: 绛县; traditional Chinese: 絳縣; pinyin: Jiàng Xiàn) is a county in the south of Shanxi province, China. It is under the administration of Yuncheng city.

It is the site of a necropolis at Hengbei dating to the Zhou dynasty.

== Climate ==
Climate data for Jiangxian, elevation 761 m (2,497 ft), (1991–2020 normals, extremes 1981–2010)
Month	Jan	Feb	Mar	Apr	May	Jun	Jul	Aug	Sep	Oct	Nov	Dec	Year
Record high °C (°F)	16.1 (61.0)	21.2 (70.2)	26.5 (79.7)	33.1 (91.6)	36.5 (97.7)	39.4 (102.9)	38.5 (101.3)	37.4 (99.3)	36.7 (98.1)	29.3 (84.7)	25.0 (77.0)	15.6 (60.1)	39.4 (102.9)
Mean daily maximum °C (°F)	3.0 (37.4)	7.2 (45.0)	13.3 (55.9)	20.0 (68.0)	24.9 (76.8)	29.2 (84.6)	30.0 (86.0)	28.3 (82.9)	23.8 (74.8)	17.9 (64.2)	10.8 (51.4)	4.4 (39.9)	17.7 (63.9)
Daily mean °C (°F)	−2.6 (27.3)	1.4 (34.5)	7.5 (45.5)	14.1 (57.4)	19.2 (66.6)	23.7 (74.7)	25.2 (77.4)	23.6 (74.5)	18.9 (66.0)	12.7 (54.9)	5.4 (41.7)	−1.1 (30.0)	12.3 (54.2)
Mean daily minimum °C (°F)	−7.0 (19.4)	−3.1 (26.4)	2.3 (36.1)	8.1 (46.6)	13.2 (55.8)	18.1 (64.6)	20.7 (69.3)	19.5 (67.1)	14.7 (58.5)	8.3 (46.9)	1.1 (34.0)	−5.2 (22.6)	7.6 (45.6)
Record low °C (°F)	−20.5 (−4.9)	−17.1 (1.2)	−11.0 (12.2)	−3.4 (25.9)	1.9 (35.4)	7.3 (45.1)	11.8 (53.2)	11.6 (52.9)	4.0 (39.2)	−5.3 (22.5)	−15.4 (4.3)	−20.4 (−4.7)	−20.5 (−4.9)
Average precipitation mm (inches)	7.4 (0.29)	10.4 (0.41)	15.9 (0.63)	44.0 (1.73)	56.8 (2.24)	65.4 (2.57)	116.1 (4.57)	89.8 (3.54)	81.7 (3.22)	50.3 (1.98)	25.2 (0.99)	5.0 (0.20)	568 (22.37)
Average precipitation days (≥ 0.1 mm)	3.6	4.1	4.9	6.5	8.0	8.1	10.4	9.9	10.0	7.7	6.0	3.2	82.4
Average snowy days	4.9	4.6	2.1	0.3	0	0	0	0	0	0	2.1	3.4	17.4
Average relative humidity (%)	54	53	51	53	55	57	69	73	71	66	63	55	60
Mean monthly sunshine hours	154.7	156.4	191.6	219.7	238.5	224.9	217.8	195.7	163.8	163.9	157.6	164.1	2,248.7
Percentage possible sunshine	49	50	51	56	55	52	50	47	45	48	52	54	51
Source: China Meteorological Administration
