= Jishan County =

Jishan County 稷山县 Chishan, Tsishan
- County
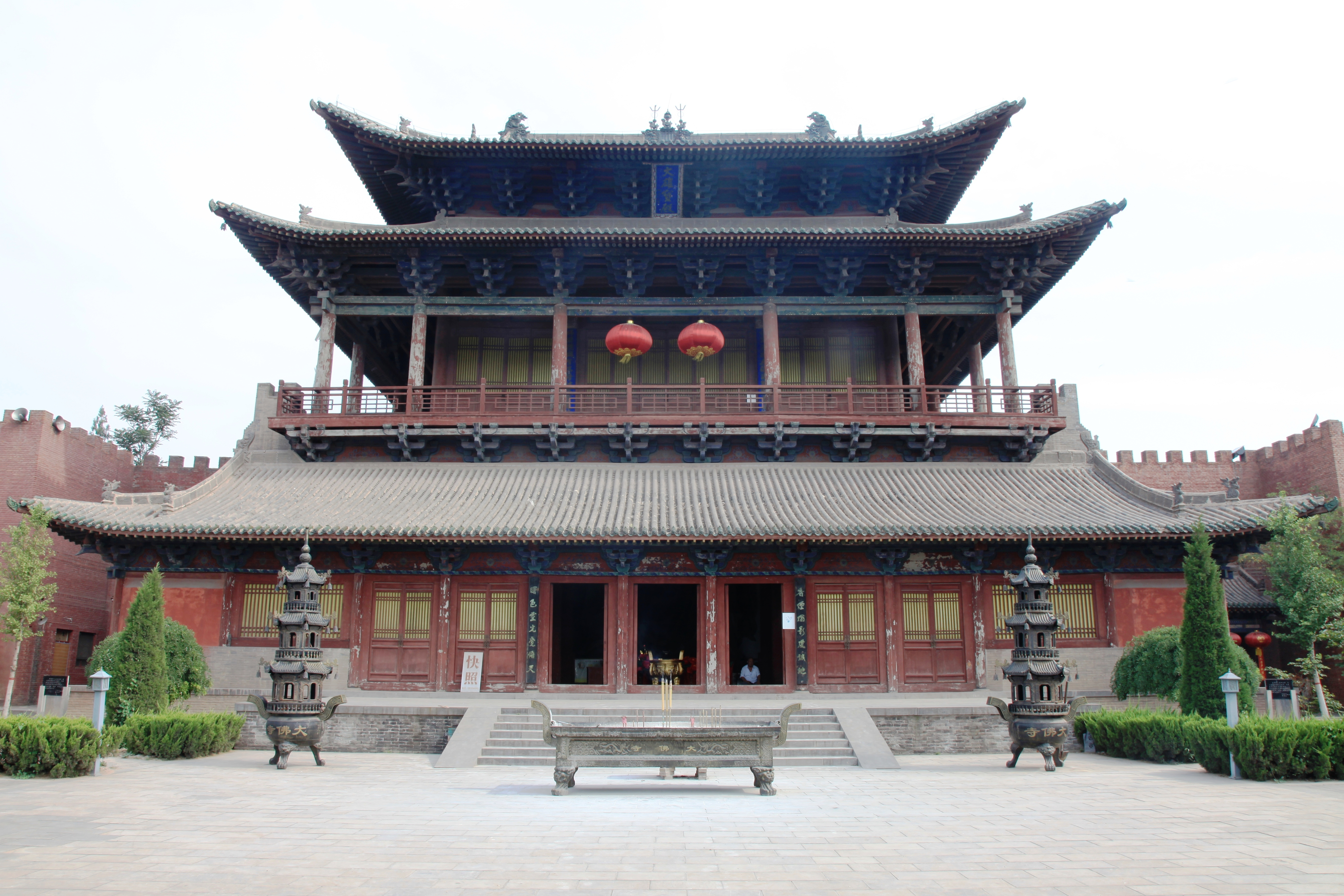
- Dafo Temple

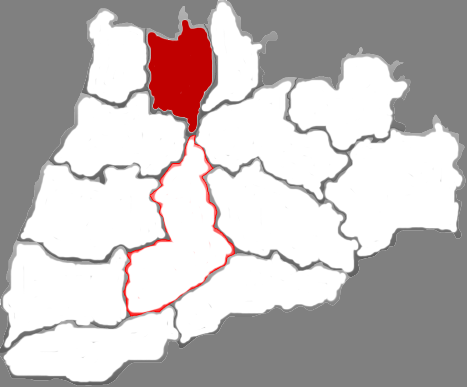
- Location in Yuncheng

- Location in Shanxi
- Coordinates: 35.604°N 110.983°E
- Country: People's Republic of China
- Province: Shanxi
- Prefecture-level city: Yuncheng
- Seat: Jifeng (稷峰镇)

Population (2020)
  - Total: 316,114
- Time zone: UTC+8 (China Standard)
- Website: www.jishan.gov.cn/index.jsp

Jishan (Chinese: 稷山; pinyin: Jìshān (pronounced: jēʹshänʹ)) is a county in the southwest of Shanxi province, China. It is on the Fen River under the administration of Yuncheng city.

== History ==
The Macun Tombs of the Duan family, known for their extravagant interior wall reliefs, were discovered in Macun village in the county.

In 1960, Jishan County was noted as a model county in the Four Pests campaign.

In April 2007, three officials in Jishan county (Nan Huirong, Xue Zhijing and Yang Qinyu) criticized County CCP Secretary Li Runshan in a writing circulated to local government departments. They were arrested ten days later and subsequently appeared in handcuffs at a "public warning meeting" attended by more than five hundred local officials.

== Administrative Divisions ==
Five towns:

- Jifeng (稷峰镇), Xishe (西社镇), Huayu (化峪镇), Zhaidian (翟店镇), Qinghe (清河镇),

Two townships:

- Caicun (蔡村乡), Taiyang (太阳乡)

== Demographics ==
The population of Jishan County in c.1952 was 110,984 and in 1990 was 281,849.

== Climate ==
Climate data for Jishan, elevation 434 m (1,424 ft), (1991–2020 normals, extremes 1981–2010)
Month	Jan	Feb	Mar	Apr	May	Jun	Jul	Aug	Sep	Oct	Nov	Dec	Year
Record high °C (°F)	15.7 (60.3)	22.2 (72.0)	30.6 (87.1)	38.7 (101.7)	40.3 (104.5)	42.3 (108.1)	41.4 (106.5)	39.8 (103.6)	40.0 (104.0)	31.6 (88.9)	25.1 (77.2)	15.8 (60.4)	42.3 (108.1)
Mean daily maximum °C (°F)	5.4 (41.7)	10.1 (50.2)	16.5 (61.7)	23.3 (73.9)	28.5 (83.3)	32.8 (91.0)	33.6 (92.5)	31.6 (88.9)	26.7 (80.1)	20.6 (69.1)	13.0 (55.4)	6.4 (43.5)	20.7 (69.3)
Daily mean °C (°F)	−1.2 (29.8)	3.1 (37.6)	9.4 (48.9)	15.9 (60.6)	21.1 (70.0)	25.9 (78.6)	27.4 (81.3)	25.7 (78.3)	20.4 (68.7)	13.9 (57.0)	6.5 (43.7)	0.1 (32.2)	14.0 (57.2)
Mean daily minimum °C (°F)	−6.2 (20.8)	−2.3 (27.9)	3.5 (38.3)	9.3 (48.7)	14.4 (57.9)	19.5 (67.1)	22.4 (72.3)	21.1 (70.0)	15.8 (60.4)	9.0 (48.2)	1.6 (34.9)	−4.6 (23.7)	8.6 (47.5)
Record low °C (°F)	−17.0 (1.4)	−19.2 (−2.6)	−9.8 (14.4)	−2.9 (26.8)	2.0 (35.6)	9.1 (48.4)	13.2 (55.8)	12.9 (55.2)	3.0 (37.4)	−5.5 (22.1)	−12.9 (8.8)	−17.8 (0.0)	−19.2 (−2.6)
Average precipitation mm (inches)	4.7 (0.19)	7.6 (0.30)	11.8 (0.46)	29.8 (1.17)	41.0 (1.61)	50.8 (2.00)	86.9 (3.42)	83.2 (3.28)	69.5 (2.74)	42.2 (1.66)	17.5 (0.69)	2.9 (0.11)	447.9 (17.63)
Average precipitation days (≥ 0.1 mm)	2.4	2.8	3.9	5.6	7.2	7.6	9.6	8.6	9.5	7.1	4.5	1.8	70.6
Average snowy days	3.0	2.6	0.8	0.1	0	0	0	0	0	0	0.9	2.1	9.5
Average relative humidity (%)	55	53	50	53	54	55	66	71	72	70	66	58	60
Mean monthly sunshine hours	146.3	152.8	188.0	214.9	235.6	219.5	216.2	202.1	162.2	156.9	145.9	146.9	2,187.3
Percentage possible sunshine	47	49	50	54	54	51	49	49	44	46	48	49	49
Source: China Meteorological Administration

== Economy ==
Jishan County produces grain and cotton and historically has produced rice, wheat, cotton, millet and fruit.
