= Wuxiang County =

Wuxiang County 武乡县 Wusiang
- County
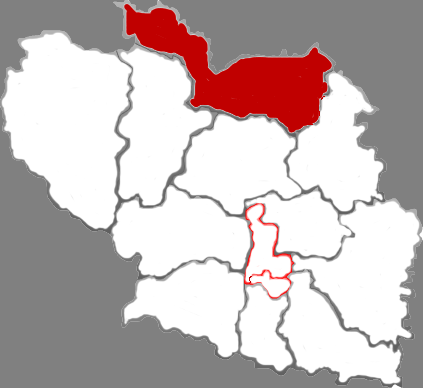
- Wuxiang in Changzhi

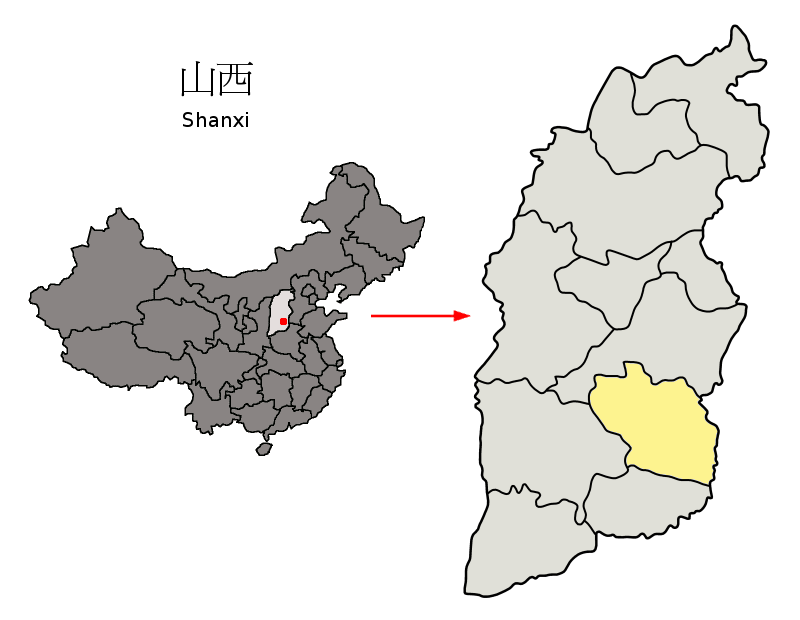
- Changzhi in Shanxi
- Coordinates: 36°50′17″N 112°51′50″E
- Country: People's Republic of China
- Province: Shanxi
- Prefecture-level city: Changzhi

Area
  - Total: 1,614 km^{2} (623 sq mi)

Population (2020)
  - Total: 155,386
  - Density: 96.27/km^{2} (249.3/sq mi)
- Time zone: UTC+8 (China Standard)

Wuxiang County (simplified Chinese: 武乡县; traditional Chinese: 武鄉縣; pinyin: Wǔxiāng Xiàn) is a county in the southeast of Shanxi province, China. It is the northernmost county-level division of the prefecture-level city of Changzhi.

== Climate ==
Climate data for Wuxiang, elevation 964 m (3,163 ft), (1991–2020 normals, extremes 1981–2010)
Month	Jan	Feb	Mar	Apr	May	Jun	Jul	Aug	Sep	Oct	Nov	Dec	Year
Record high °C (°F)	15.2 (59.4)	21.8 (71.2)	28.6 (83.5)	35.5 (95.9)	37.2 (99.0)	38.5 (101.3)	37.4 (99.3)	36.4 (97.5)	35.5 (95.9)	28.3 (82.9)	25.1 (77.2)	16.5 (61.7)	38.5 (101.3)
Mean daily maximum °C (°F)	2.7 (36.9)	6.3 (43.3)	12.3 (54.1)	19.8 (67.6)	25.0 (77.0)	28.5 (83.3)	29.2 (84.6)	27.4 (81.3)	23.1 (73.6)	17.8 (64.0)	10.2 (50.4)	3.8 (38.8)	17.2 (62.9)
Daily mean °C (°F)	−6.0 (21.2)	−1.8 (28.8)	4.3 (39.7)	11.8 (53.2)	17.4 (63.3)	21.2 (70.2)	22.9 (73.2)	21.1 (70.0)	16.1 (61.0)	9.7 (49.5)	2.1 (35.8)	−4.4 (24.1)	9.5 (49.2)
Mean daily minimum °C (°F)	−12.6 (9.3)	−8.2 (17.2)	−2.4 (27.7)	4.3 (39.7)	9.7 (49.5)	14.4 (57.9)	17.8 (64.0)	16.3 (61.3)	10.7 (51.3)	3.5 (38.3)	−3.7 (25.3)	−10.2 (13.6)	3.3 (37.9)
Record low °C (°F)	−25.5 (−13.9)	−24.4 (−11.9)	−17.0 (1.4)	−8.2 (17.2)	−1.3 (29.7)	4.3 (39.7)	10.5 (50.9)	8.0 (46.4)	−1.3 (29.7)	−7.9 (17.8)	−19.7 (−3.5)	−25.3 (−13.5)	−25.5 (−13.9)
Average precipitation mm (inches)	4.3 (0.17)	7.7 (0.30)	12.5 (0.49)	27.8 (1.09)	34.0 (1.34)	58.2 (2.29)	131.3 (5.17)	107.2 (4.22)	65.5 (2.58)	29.1 (1.15)	18.0 (0.71)	3.3 (0.13)	498.9 (19.64)
Average precipitation days (≥ 0.1 mm)	3.0	3.8	4.3	5.8	7.1	10.4	13.0	11.4	9.6	6.5	4.7	2.6	82.2
Average snowy days	3.6	4.9	3.4	0.7	0	0	0	0	0	0.1	2.7	3.5	18.9
Average relative humidity (%)	56	57	52	49	52	61	73	77	76	69	65	59	62
Mean monthly sunshine hours	186.8	178.1	207.1	241.0	263.7	232.7	217.1	204.1	186.0	203.3	186.1	187.3	2,493.3
Percentage possible sunshine	60	58	55	61	60	53	49	49	51	59	61	63	57
Source: China Meteorological Administration
