= List of administrative divisions of Shanxi =

Administrative divisions of Shanxi, a province of the People's Republic of China

Shanxi Province
- Province
- Capital: Taiyuan

Prefecture-level divisions
- Prefectural cities: 11

County level divisions
- County cities: 11
- Counties: 80
- Districts: 26

Township level divisions
- Towns: 568
- Townships: 628
- Subdistricts: 195

Villages level divisions
- Communities: 2,347
- Administrative villages: 28,106

Shanxi, a province of the People's Republic of China, is made up of prefecture-level divisions, which are divided into county-level divisions, which are then divided into township-level divisions.

== Administrative divisions ==
These administrative divisions are explained in greater detail at Administrative divisions of the People's Republic of China. The following table lists only the prefecture-level and county-level divisions of Shanxi.

Prefecture level	County Level				
Prefecture level	Name	Chinese	Hanyu Pinyin	Division code	
Taiyuan city 太原市; Tàiyuán Shì (Capital) (1401 / TYN)	Xiaodian District	小店区	Xiǎodiàn Qū	140105	XDQ
Taiyuan city 太原市; Tàiyuán Shì (Capital) (1401 / TYN)	Yingze District	迎泽区	Yíngzé Qū	140106	YZT
Taiyuan city 太原市; Tàiyuán Shì (Capital) (1401 / TYN)	Xinghualing District	杏花岭区	Xìnghuālǐng Qū	140107	XHL
Taiyuan city 太原市; Tàiyuán Shì (Capital) (1401 / TYN)	Jiancaoping District	尖草坪区	Jiāncǎopíng Qū	140108	JCP
Taiyuan city 太原市; Tàiyuán Shì (Capital) (1401 / TYN)	Wanbailin District	万柏林区	Wànbǎilín Qū	140109	WBL
Taiyuan city 太原市; Tàiyuán Shì (Capital) (1401 / TYN)	Jinyuan District	晋源区	Jìnyuán Qū	140110	JYM
Taiyuan city 太原市; Tàiyuán Shì (Capital) (1401 / TYN)	Qingxu County	清徐县	Qīngxú Xiàn	140121	QXU
Taiyuan city 太原市; Tàiyuán Shì (Capital) (1401 / TYN)	Yangqu County	阳曲县	Yángqǔ Xiàn	140122	YGQ
Taiyuan city 太原市; Tàiyuán Shì (Capital) (1401 / TYN)	Loufan County	娄烦县	Lóufán Xiàn	140123	LFA
Taiyuan city 太原市; Tàiyuán Shì (Capital) (1401 / TYN)	Gujiao city	古交市	Gǔjiāo Shì	140181	GUJ
Datong city 大同市; Dàtóng Shì (1402 / DTG)	Pingcheng District	平城区	Píngchéng Qū	140202	XRQ
Datong city 大同市; Dàtóng Shì (1402 / DTG)	Yungang District	云冈区	Yúngāng Qū	140211	
Datong city 大同市; Dàtóng Shì (1402 / DTG)	Xinrong District	新荣区	Xīnróng Qū	140212	
Datong city 大同市; Dàtóng Shì (1402 / DTG)	Yunzhou District	云州区	Yúnzhōu Qū	140213	
Datong city 大同市; Dàtóng Shì (1402 / DTG)	Yanggao County	阳高县	Yánggāo Xiàn	140221	YGO
Datong city 大同市; Dàtóng Shì (1402 / DTG)	Tianzhen County	天镇县	Tiānzhèn Xiàn	140222	TZE
Datong city 大同市; Dàtóng Shì (1402 / DTG)	Guangling County	广灵县	Guǎnglíng Xiàn	140223	GLJ
Datong city 大同市; Dàtóng Shì (1402 / DTG)	Lingqiu County	灵丘县	Língqiū Xiàn	140224	LQX
Datong city 大同市; Dàtóng Shì (1402 / DTG)	Hunyuan County	浑源县	Húnyuán Xiàn	140225	HYM
Datong city 大同市; Dàtóng Shì (1402 / DTG)	Zuoyun County	左云县	Zuǒyún Xiàn	140226	ZUY
Yangquan city 阳泉市; Yángquán Shì (1403 / YQS)	Chengqu District (Note: Official name registered by the Ministry of Civil Affairs.)	城区	Chéngqū	140302	CQU
Yangquan city 阳泉市; Yángquán Shì (1403 / YQS)	Kuangqu District	矿区	Kuàngqū	140303	KQY
Yangquan city 阳泉市; Yángquán Shì (1403 / YQS)	Jiaoqu District	郊区	Jiāoqū	140311	JQY
Yangquan city 阳泉市; Yángquán Shì (1403 / YQS)	Pingding County	平定县	Píngdìng Xiàn	140321	PDG
Yangquan city 阳泉市; Yángquán Shì (1403 / YQS)	Yuxian County	盂县	Yùxiàn	140322	YUX
Changzhi city 长治市; Chángzhì Shì (1404 / CZS)	Luzhou District	潞州区	Lùzhōu Qū	140411	
Changzhi city 长治市; Chángzhì Shì (1404 / CZS)	Lucheng District	潞城区	Lùchéng Qū	140412	
Changzhi city 长治市; Chángzhì Shì (1404 / CZS)	Shangdang District	上党区	Shàngdǎng Qū	140413	
Changzhi city 长治市; Chángzhì Shì (1404 / CZS)	Tunliu District	屯留区	Túnliú Qū	140414	
Changzhi city 长治市; Chángzhì Shì (1404 / CZS)	Xiangyuan County	襄垣县	Xiāngyuán Xiàn	140423	XYJ
Changzhi city 长治市; Chángzhì Shì (1404 / CZS)	Pingshun County	平顺县	Píngshùn Xiàn	140425	PSX
Changzhi city 长治市; Chángzhì Shì (1404 / CZS)	Licheng County	黎城县	Líchéng Xiàn	140426	LIC
Changzhi city 长治市; Chángzhì Shì (1404 / CZS)	Huguan County	壶关县	Húguān Xiàn	140427	HGN
Changzhi city 长治市; Chángzhì Shì (1404 / CZS)	Zhangzi County	长子县	Zhǎngzǐ Xiàn (Note: not Chángzǐ)	140428	ZHZ
Changzhi city 长治市; Chángzhì Shì (1404 / CZS)	Wuxiang County	武乡县	Wǔxiāng Xiàn	140429	WXG
Changzhi city 长治市; Chángzhì Shì (1404 / CZS)	Qinxian County	沁县	Qìnxiàn	140430	QIN
Changzhi city 长治市; Chángzhì Shì (1404 / CZS)	Qinyuan County	沁源县	Qìnyuán Xiàn	140431	QYU
Jincheng city 晋城市; Jìnchéng Shì (1405 / JCG)	Chengqu District	城区	Chéngqū	140502	CQJ
Jincheng city 晋城市; Jìnchéng Shì (1405 / JCG)	Qinshui County	沁水县	Qìnshuǐ Xiàn	140521	QSI
Jincheng city 晋城市; Jìnchéng Shì (1405 / JCG)	Yangcheng County	阳城县	Yángchéng Xiàn	140522	YGC
Jincheng city 晋城市; Jìnchéng Shì (1405 / JCG)	Lingchuan County	陵川县	Língchuān Xiàn	140524	LGC
Jincheng city 晋城市; Jìnchéng Shì (1405 / JCG)	Zezhou County	泽州县	Zézhōu Xiàn	140525	ZEZ
Jincheng city 晋城市; Jìnchéng Shì (1405 / JCG)	Gaoping city	高平市	Gāopíng Shì	140581	GPG
Shuozhou city 朔州市; Shuòzhōu Shì (1406 / SZJ)	Shuocheng District	朔城区	Shuòchéng Qū	140602	SCH
Shuozhou city 朔州市; Shuòzhōu Shì (1406 / SZJ)	Pinglu District	平鲁区	Pínglǔ Qū	140603	PLU
Shuozhou city 朔州市; Shuòzhōu Shì (1406 / SZJ)	Shanyin County	山阴县	Shānyīn Xiàn	140621	SYP
Shuozhou city 朔州市; Shuòzhōu Shì (1406 / SZJ)	Yingxian County	应县	Yìngxiàn	140622	YIG
Shuozhou city 朔州市; Shuòzhōu Shì (1406 / SZJ)	Youyu County	右玉县	Yòuyù Xiàn	140623	YOY
Shuozhou city 朔州市; Shuòzhōu Shì (1406 / SZJ)	Huairen city	怀仁市	Huáirén Shì	140681	
Jinzhong city 晋中市; Jìnzhōng Shì (1407 / JZN)	Yuci District	榆次区	Yúcì Qū	140702	YCI
Jinzhong city 晋中市; Jìnzhōng Shì (1407 / JZN)	Taigu District	太谷区	Tàigǔ Qū	140703	
Jinzhong city 晋中市; Jìnzhōng Shì (1407 / JZN)	Yushe County	榆社县	Yúshè Xiàn	140721	YSJ
Jinzhong city 晋中市; Jìnzhōng Shì (1407 / JZN)	Zuoquan County	左权县	Zuǒquán Xiàn	140722	ZQX
Jinzhong city 晋中市; Jìnzhōng Shì (1407 / JZN)	Heshun County	和顺县	Héshùn Xiàn	140723	HSJ
Jinzhong city 晋中市; Jìnzhōng Shì (1407 / JZN)	Xiyang County	昔阳县	Xīyáng Xiàn	140724	XIY
Jinzhong city 晋中市; Jìnzhōng Shì (1407 / JZN)	Shouyang County	寿阳县	Shòuyáng Xiàn	140725	SYJ
Jinzhong city 晋中市; Jìnzhōng Shì (1407 / JZN)	Qixian County	祁县	Qíxiàn	140727	QIJ
Jinzhong city 晋中市; Jìnzhōng Shì (1407 / JZN)	Pingyao County	平遥县	Píngyáo Xiàn	140728	PGY
Jinzhong city 晋中市; Jìnzhōng Shì (1407 / JZN)	Lingshi County	灵石县	Língshí Xiàn	140729	LSF
Jinzhong city 晋中市; Jìnzhōng Shì (1407 / JZN)	Jiexiu city	介休市	Jièxiū Shì	140781	JXS
Yuncheng city 运城市; Yùnchéng Shì (1408 / YCE)	Yanhu District	盐湖区	Yánhú Qū	140802	YAH
Yuncheng city 运城市; Yùnchéng Shì (1408 / YCE)	Linyi County	临猗县	Línyī Xiàn	140821	LYJ
Yuncheng city 运城市; Yùnchéng Shì (1408 / YCE)	Wanrong County	万荣县	Wànróng Xiàn	140822	WRG
Yuncheng city 运城市; Yùnchéng Shì (1408 / YCE)	Wenxi County	闻喜县	Wénxǐ Xiàn	140823	WNX
Yuncheng city 运城市; Yùnchéng Shì (1408 / YCE)	Jishan County	稷山县	Jìshān Xiàn	140824	JSJ
Yuncheng city 运城市; Yùnchéng Shì (1408 / YCE)	Xinjiang County	新绛县	Xīnjiàng Xiàn	140825	XNJ
Yuncheng city 运城市; Yùnchéng Shì (1408 / YCE)	Jiangxian County	绛县	Jiàngxiàn	140826	JXC
Yuncheng city 运城市; Yùnchéng Shì (1408 / YCE)	Yuanqu County	垣曲县	Yuánqǔ Xiàn	140827	YQU
Yuncheng city 运城市; Yùnchéng Shì (1408 / YCE)	Xiaxian County	夏县	Xiàxiàn	140828	XIA
Yuncheng city 运城市; Yùnchéng Shì (1408 / YCE)	Pinglu County	平陆县	Pínglù Xiàn	140829	PGL
Yuncheng city 运城市; Yùnchéng Shì (1408 / YCE)	Ruicheng County	芮城县	Ruìchéng Xiàn	140830	RIC
Yuncheng city 运城市; Yùnchéng Shì (1408 / YCE)	Yongji city	永济市	Yǒngjì Shì	140881	YJJ
Yuncheng city 运城市; Yùnchéng Shì (1408 / YCE)	Hejin city	河津市	Héjīn Shì	140882	HJS
Xinzhou city 忻州市; Xīnzhōu Shì (1409 / XZS)	Xinfu District	忻府区	Xīnfǔ Qū	140902	XNU
Xinzhou city 忻州市; Xīnzhōu Shì (1409 / XZS)	Dingxiang County	定襄县	Dìngxiāng Xiàn	140921	DXJ
Xinzhou city 忻州市; Xīnzhōu Shì (1409 / XZS)	Wutai County	五台县	Wǔtái Xiàn	140922	WTA
Xinzhou city 忻州市; Xīnzhōu Shì (1409 / XZS)	Daixian County	代县	Dàixiàn	140923	DAI
Xinzhou city 忻州市; Xīnzhōu Shì (1409 / XZS)	Fanshi County	繁峙县	Fánshì Xiàn (Note: not Fánzhì)	140924	FSI
Xinzhou city 忻州市; Xīnzhōu Shì (1409 / XZS)	Ningwu County	宁武县	Níngwǔ Xiàn	140925	NWU
Xinzhou city 忻州市; Xīnzhōu Shì (1409 / XZS)	Jingle County	静乐县	Jìnglè Xiàn	140926	JGL
Xinzhou city 忻州市; Xīnzhōu Shì (1409 / XZS)	Shenchi County	神池县	Shénchí Xiàn	140927	SCI
Xinzhou city 忻州市; Xīnzhōu Shì (1409 / XZS)	Wuzhai County	五寨县	Wǔzhài Xiàn	140928	WZH
Xinzhou city 忻州市; Xīnzhōu Shì (1409 / XZS)	Kelan County	岢岚县	Kělán Xiàn	140929	KLN
Xinzhou city 忻州市; Xīnzhōu Shì (1409 / XZS)	Hequ County	河曲县	Héqǔ Xiàn	140930	HQU
Xinzhou city 忻州市; Xīnzhōu Shì (1409 / XZS)	Baode County	保德县	Bǎodé Xiàn	140931	BDE
Xinzhou city 忻州市; Xīnzhōu Shì (1409 / XZS)	Pianguan County	偏关县	Piānguān Xiàn	140932	PGN
Xinzhou city 忻州市; Xīnzhōu Shì (1409 / XZS)	Yuanping city	原平市	Yuánpíng Shì	140981	YUP
Linfen city 临汾市; Línfén Shì (1410 / LFN)	Yaodu District	尧都区	Yáodū Qū	141002	YDJ
Linfen city 临汾市; Línfén Shì (1410 / LFN)	Quwo County	曲沃县	Qǔwò Xiàn	141021	QWO
Linfen city 临汾市; Línfén Shì (1410 / LFN)	Yicheng County	翼城县	Yìchéng Xiàn	141022	YCB
Linfen city 临汾市; Línfén Shì (1410 / LFN)	Xiangfen County	襄汾县	Xiāngfén Xiàn	141023	XFJ
Linfen city 临汾市; Línfén Shì (1410 / LFN)	Hongtong County	洪洞县	Hóngtóng Xiàn (Note: not Hóngdòng)	141024	HTO
Linfen city 临汾市; Línfén Shì (1410 / LFN)	Guxian County	古县	Gǔxiàn	141025	GUX
Linfen city 临汾市; Línfén Shì (1410 / LFN)	Anze County	安泽县	Ānzé Xiàn	141026	AZE
Linfen city 临汾市; Línfén Shì (1410 / LFN)	Fushan County	浮山县	Fúshān Xiàn	141027	FSJ
Linfen city 临汾市; Línfén Shì (1410 / LFN)	Jixian County	吉县	Jíxiàn	141028	JIJ
Linfen city 临汾市; Línfén Shì (1410 / LFN)	Xiangning County	乡宁县	Xiāngníng Xiàn	141029	XGN
Linfen city 临汾市; Línfén Shì (1410 / LFN)	Daning County	大宁县	Dàníng Xiàn	141030	DNG
Linfen city 临汾市; Línfén Shì (1410 / LFN)	Xixian County	隰县	Xíxiàn	141031	XIJ
Linfen city 临汾市; Línfén Shì (1410 / LFN)	Yonghe County	永和县	Yǒnghé Xiàn	141032	YGH
Linfen city 临汾市; Línfén Shì (1410 / LFN)	Puxian County	蒲县	Púxiàn	141033	PUX
Linfen city 临汾市; Línfén Shì (1410 / LFN)	Fenxi County	汾西县	Fénxī Xiàn	141034	FEX
Linfen city 临汾市; Línfén Shì (1410 / LFN)	Houma city	侯马市	Hóumǎ Shì (Note: not Hòumǎ)	141081	HMA
Linfen city 临汾市; Línfén Shì (1410 / LFN)	Huozhou city	霍州市	Huòzhōu Shì	141082	HOZ
Lüliang city 吕梁市; Lǚlíang Shì (1411 / LLH)	Lishi District	离石区	Líshí Qū	141102	LSW
Lüliang city 吕梁市; Lǚlíang Shì (1411 / LLH)	Wenshui County	文水县	Wénshuǐ Xiàn	141121	WSJ
Lüliang city 吕梁市; Lǚlíang Shì (1411 / LLH)	Jiaocheng County	交城县	Jiāochéng Xiàn	141122	JCJ
Lüliang city 吕梁市; Lǚlíang Shì (1411 / LLH)	Xingxian County	兴县	Xīngxiàn	141123	XGX
Lüliang city 吕梁市; Lǚlíang Shì (1411 / LLH)	Linxian County	临县	Línxiàn	141124	LXN
Lüliang city 吕梁市; Lǚlíang Shì (1411 / LLH)	Liulin County	柳林县	Liǔlín Xiàn	141125	LUL
Lüliang city 吕梁市; Lǚlíang Shì (1411 / LLH)	Shilou County	石楼县	Shílóu Xiàn	141126	SLO
Lüliang city 吕梁市; Lǚlíang Shì (1411 / LLH)	Lanxian County	岚县	Lánxiàn	141127	LAN
Lüliang city 吕梁市; Lǚlíang Shì (1411 / LLH)	Fangshan County	方山县	Fāngshān Xiàn	141128	FGS
Lüliang city 吕梁市; Lǚlíang Shì (1411 / LLH)	Zhongyang County	中阳县	Zhōngyáng Xiàn	141129	ZHY
Lüliang city 吕梁市; Lǚlíang Shì (1411 / LLH)	Jiaokou County	交口县	Jiāokǒu Xiàn	141130	JKO
Lüliang city 吕梁市; Lǚlíang Shì (1411 / LLH)	Xiaoyi city	孝义市	Xiàoyì Shì	141181	XOY
Lüliang city 吕梁市; Lǚlíang Shì (1411 / LLH)	Fenyang city	汾阳市	Fényáng Shì	141182	FYJ

== Recent changes in administrative divisions ==
Date	Before	After	Note	Reference
1970-01-11	parts of Jiao District, Yangquan	Kuang District, Yangquan	established	
1970-03-21	Jinnan Prefecture	Linfen Prefecture	renamed	
1970-03-21	Jinnan Prefecture	Yuncheng Prefecture	established	
1970-03-21	↳ Yuncheng County	↳ Yuncheng County	transferred	
1970-03-21	↳ Hejin County	↳ Hejin County	transferred	
1970-03-21	↳ Jishan County	↳ Jishan County	transferred	
1970-03-21	↳ Xinjiang County	↳ Xinjiang County	transferred	
1970-03-21	↳ Wenxi County	↳ Wenxi County	transferred	
1970-03-21	↳ Xia County	↳ Xia County	transferred	
1970-03-21	↳ Yongji County	↳ Yongji County	transferred	
1970-03-21	↳ Ruicheng County	↳ Ruicheng County	transferred	
1970-03-21	↳ Yuanqu County	↳ Yuanqu County	transferred	
1970-03-21	↳ Jiang County	↳ Jiang County	transferred	
1970-03-21	↳ Wanrong County	↳ Wanrong County	transferred	
1970-03-21	↳ Linyi County	↳ Linyi County	transferred	
1970-03-21	Datong (P-City)	Yanbei Prefecture	merged into	
1970-03-21	Datong (P-City)	↳ Datong (PC-City)	established	
1970-03-21	↳ Cheng District, Datong	◎ Cheng District, Datong	transferred	
1970-03-21	↳ Jiao District, Datong	◎ Jiao District, Datong	transferred	
1970-03-21	↳ Kouquan District	◎ Kouquan District	transferred	
1970-03-21	Yangquan (P-City)	Jinzhong Prefecture	merged into	
1970-03-21	Yangquan (P-City)	↳ Yangquan (PC-City)	established	
1970-03-21	↳ Cheng District, Yangquan	◎ Cheng District, Yangquan	transferred	
1970-03-21	↳ Jiao District, Yangquan	◎ Jiao District, Yangquan	transferred	
1970-03-21	↳ Kuang District, Yangquan	◎ Kuang District, Yangquan	transferred	
1970-09-14	Kouquan District	Kuang District	renamed	
1970-11-09	Jiao District, Datong	Nanjiao District	disestablished & established	
1970-11-09	Jiao District, Datong	Beijiao District	disestablished & established	
1971-04-06	parts of Jinzhong Prefecture	Lüliang Prefecture	established	
1971-04-06	↳ Lishi County	↳ Lishi County	transferred	
1971-04-06	↳ Lishi County	↳ Fangshan County	transferred & established	
1971-04-06	↳ Fenyang County	↳ Fenyang County	transferred	
1971-04-06	↳ Xiaoyi County	↳ Xiaoyi County	transferred	
1971-04-06	↳ Zhongyang County	↳ Zhongyang County	transferred	
1971-04-06	↳ Jiaocheng County	↳ Jiaocheng County	transferred	
1971-04-06	↳ Lin County	↳ Lin County	transferred	
1971-04-06	↳ Changli County	↳ Changli County	transferred	
1971-04-06	parts of Xinxian Prefecture	Lüliang Prefecture	established	
1971-04-06	↳ Xing County	↳ Xing County	transferred	
1971-04-06	↳ Lan County	↳ Lan County	transferred	
1971-04-06	↳ parts of Jingle County	↳ Loufan County	transferred	
1971-04-06	parts of Linfen Prefecture	Lüliang Prefecture	established	
1971-04-06	↳ Shilou County	↳ Shilou County	transferred	
1971-06-05	parts of Yuci County	Yuci (PC-City)	established	
1971-06-05	parts of Houma County	Houma (PC-City)	established	
1971-06-05	parts of Linfen County	Linfen (PC-City)	established	
1971-06-05	parts of Anze County	Gu County	established	
1971-06-05	parts of Fushan County	Gu County	established	
1971-07-05	Beijiao District	Xinrong District	renamed	
1971-10-05	parts of Lishi County	Liulin County	established	
1971-10-06	Gu County	Yueyang County	renamed	
1971-12-05	Yueyang County	Gu County	renamed	
1972-03-09	parts of Yanbei Prefecture	Datong (P-City)	established	
1972-03-09	↳ Datong (PC-City)	Datong (P-City)	disestablished	
1972-03-09	◎ Cheng District, Datong	↳ Cheng District, Datong	transferred	
1972-03-09	◎ Nanjiao District	↳ Nanjiao District	transferred	
1972-03-09	◎ Xinrong District	↳ Xinrong County	transferred & reorganized	
1972-03-09	◎ Kuang District, Datong	↳ Kuang District, Datong	transferred	
1972-03-09	parts of Jinzhong Prefecture	Yangquan (P-City)	established	
1972-03-09	↳ Yangquan (PC-City)	Yangquan (P-City)	disestablished	
1972-03-09	◎ Cheng District, Yangquan	↳ Cheng District, Yangquan	transferred	
1972-03-09	◎ Jiao District, Yangquan	↳ Jiao District, Yangquan	transferred	
1972-03-09	◎ Kuang District, Yangquan	↳ Kuang District, Yangquan	transferred	
1972-04-05	Xinrong County	Xinrong District	reorganized	
1975-07-09	parts of Jindongnan Prefecture	Changzhi (P-City) city district	established	
1975-07-09	Changzhi (PC-City)	Changzhi (P-City) city district	disestablished	
1975-11-08	parts of Lüliang Prefecture	Taiyuan (P-City)	transferred	
1975-11-08	↳ Loufan County	↳ Loufan County	transferred	
1975-12-30	Changzhi (P-City) city district	Cheng District, Changzhi	established	
1975-12-30	Changzhi (P-City) city district	Jiao District, Changzhi	established	
1983-01-18	all Province-controlled city (P-City) → Prefecture-level city (PL-City)			Civil Affairs Announcement
1983-01-18	all Prefecture-controlled city (PC-City) → County-level city (CL-City)			Civil Affairs Announcement
1983-07-28	parts of Jinzhong Prefecture	Yangquan (PL-City)	transferred	
1983-07-28	↳ Pingding County	↳ Pingding County	transferred	
1983-07-28	↳ Yu County	↳ Yu County	transferred	
1983-07-28	parts of Jindongnan Prefecture	Changzhi (PL-City)	transferred	
1983-07-28	↳ Changzhi County	↳ Changzhi County	transferred	
1983-07-28	↳ Lucheng County	↳ Lucheng County	transferred	
1983-07-28	Xinxian Prefecture	Xinzhou Prefecture	renamed	
1983-07-28	Xin County	Xinzhou (CL-City)	reorganized	
1983-07-28	Jincheng County	Jincheng (CL-City)	reorganized	
1983-07-28	Yuncheng County	Yuncheng (CL-City)	reorganized	
1983-07-28	Yuci County	Yuci (CL-City)	merged into	
1983-07-28	Linfen County	Linfen (CL-City)	merged into	
1985-04-30	parts of Jindongnan Prefecture	Changzhi (PL-City)	transferred	
1985-04-30	↳ Xiangyuan County	↳ Xiangyuan County	transferred	
1985-04-30	↳ Tunliu County	↳ Tunliu County	transferred	
1985-04-30	↳ Pingshun County	↳ Pingshun County	transferred	
1985-04-30	↳ Licheng County	↳ Licheng County	transferred	
1985-04-30	↳ Huguan County	↳ Huguan County	transferred	
1985-04-30	↳ Zhangzi County	↳ Zhangzi County	transferred	
1985-04-30	↳ Wuxiang County	↳ Wuxiang County	transferred	
1985-04-30	↳ Qin County	↳ Qin County	transferred	
1985-04-30	↳ Qinyuan County	↳ Qinyuan County	transferred	
1985-04-30	Jindongnan Prefecture	Jincheng (PL-City)	reorganized	
1985-04-30	Jincheng (CL-City)	Cheng District, Jincheng	disestablished & established	
1985-04-30	Jincheng (CL-City)	Jiao District, Jincheng	disestablished & established	
1988-02-24	Gujiaogong Kuang District	Gujiao (CL-City)	reorganized	
1988-03-24	parts of Yanbei Prefecture	Shuozhou (PL-City)	established	
1988-03-24	Shuo County	Shuocheng District	transferred & reorganized	
1988-03-24	Pinglu County	Pinglu District	transferred & reorganized	
1988-03-24	↳ Shanyin County	↳ Shanyin County	transferred	
1989-12-23	Huo County	Huozhou (CL-City)	reorganized	
1992-02-10	Xiaoyi County	Xiaoyi (CL-City)	reorganized	Civil Affairs [1992]12
1992-02-10	Jiexiu County	Jiexiu (CL-City)	reorganized	Civil Affairs [1992]13
1993-05-12	Gaoping County	Gaoping (CL-City)	reorganized	Civil Affairs [1993]93
1993-06-17	Yuanping County	Yuanping (CL-City)	reorganized	
1993-05-12	parts of Yanbei Prefecture	Datong (PL-City)	disestablished & merged into	State Council [1993]93
1993-05-12	↳ Yanggao County	↳ Yanggao County	transferred	State Council [1993]93
1993-05-12	↳ Tianzhen County	↳ Tianzhen County	transferred	State Council [1993]93
1993-05-12	↳ Guangling County	↳ Guangling County	transferred	State Council [1993]93
1993-05-12	↳ Lingqiu County	↳ Lingqiu County	transferred	State Council [1993]93
1993-05-12	↳ Hunyuan County	↳ Hunyuan County	transferred	State Council [1993]93
1993-05-12	↳ Zuoyun County	↳ Zuoyun County	transferred	State Council [1993]93
1993-05-12	↳ Datong County	↳ Datong County	transferred	State Council [1993]93
1993-05-12	parts of Yanbei Prefecture	Shuozhou (PL-City)	disestablished & merged into	State Council [1993]93
1993-05-12	↳ Ying County	↳ Ying County	transferred	State Council [1993]93
1993-05-12	↳ Youyu County	↳ Youyu County	transferred	State Council [1993]93
1993-05-12	↳ Huairen County	↳ Huairen County	transferred	State Council [1993]93
1994-01-12	Yongji County	Yongji (CL-City)	reorganized	Civil Affairs [1994]4
1994-01-12	Hejin County	Hejin (CL-City)	reorganized	Civil Affairs [1994]5
1994-04-26	Lucheng County	Lucheng (CL-City)	reorganized	Civil Affairs [1994]61
1996-04-29	Lishi County	Lishi (CL-City)	reorganized	Civil Affairs [1996]28
1996-08-08	Jiao District, Jincheng	Zezhou County	reorganized	Civil Affairs [1996]54
1996-08-20	Fenyang County	Fenyang (CL-City)	reorganized	Civil Affairs [1996]58
1997-05-08	Nancheng District, Taiyuan	Yingze District	disestablished & established	State Council [1997]33
1997-05-08	Beicheng District, Taiyuan	Xinghualing District	disestablished & established	State Council [1997]33
1997-05-08	Hexi District, Taiyuan	Wanbailin District	disestablished & established	State Council [1997]33
1997-05-08	Hexi District, Taiyuan	Jinyuan District	disestablished & established	State Council [1997]33
1997-05-08	Nanjiao District, Taiyuan	Xiaodian District	disestablished & established	State Council [1997]33
1997-05-08	Beijiao District, Taiyuan	Jiancaoping District	disestablished & established	State Council [1997]33
1999-09-24	Jinzhong Prefecture	Jinzhong (PL-City)	reorganized	State Council [1999]124
1999-09-24	Yuci (CL-City)	Yuci District	reorganized	State Council [1999]124
2000-06-14	Yuncheng Prefecture	Yuncheng (PL-City)	reorganized	
2000-06-14	Yuncheng (CL-City)	Yanhu District	reorganized	
2000-06-14	Xinzhou Prefecture	Xinzhou (PL-City)	reorganized	
2000-06-14	Xinzhou (CL-City)	Xinfu District	reorganized	
2000-06-23	Linfen Prefecture	Linfen (PL-City)	reorganized	
2000-06-23	Linfen (CL-City)	Yaodu District	reorganized	
2003-10-23	Lüliang Prefecture	Lüliang (PL-City)	reorganized	State Council [2003]112
2003-10-23	Lishi (CL-City)	Lishi District	reorganized	State Council [2003]112
2018-02-09	Cheng District, Datong	Pingcheng District	disestablished & established	State Council [2018]22
2018-02-09	parts of Nanjiao District	Pingcheng District	disestablished & established	State Council [2018]22
2018-02-09	parts of Nanjiao District	Xinrong District	merged into	State Council [2018]22
2018-02-09	parts of Nanjiao District	Yungang District	disestablished & established	State Council [2018]22
2018-02-09	Kuang District, Datong	Yungang District	disestablished & established	State Council [2018]22
2018-02-09	Datong County	Yunzhou District	reorganized	State Council [2018]22
2018-02-22	Huairen County	Huairen (CL-City)	reorganized	Civil Affairs [2018]46
2018-06-19	Jiao District, Changzhi	Luzhou District	disestablished & established	State Council [2018]87
2018-06-19	Cheng District, Changzhi	Luzhou District	disestablished & established	State Council [2018]87
2018-06-19	Lucheng (CL-City)	Lucheng District	reorganized	State Council [2018]87
2018-06-19	Changzhi County	Shangdang District	reorganized	State Council [2018]87
2018-06-19	Tunliu County	Tunliu District	reorganized	State Council [2018]87
2019-11-06	Taigu County	Taigu District	reorganized	State Council [2019]104

== Population composition ==
=== Prefectures ===
Prefecture	2010	2000
Taiyuan	4,201,591	3,344,392
Changzhi	3,334,564	3,138,991
Datong	3,318,057	3,001,508
Jincheng	2,279,151	2,160,984
Jinzhong	3,249,425	3,016,536
Linfen	4,316,612	3,950,845
Lüliang	3,727,057	3,381,630
Shuozhou	1,714,857	1,451,875
Xinzhou	3,067,501	2,938,344
Yangquan	1,368,502	1,273,116
Yuncheng	5,134,794	4,812,361

=== Counties ===
Name	Prefecture	2010
Xiaodian	Taiyuan	804,537
Yingze	Taiyuan	601,112
Xinghualing	Taiyuan	634,482
Jiancaoping	Taiyuan	415,705
Wanbailin	Taiyuan	749,255
Jinyuan	Taiyuan	221,431
Qingxu	Taiyuan	343,861
Yangqu	Taiyuan	120,228
Loufan	Taiyuan	105,841
Gujiao	Taiyuan	205,139
Pingcheng	Datong	723,013
Yungang	Datong	405,864
Xinrong	Datong	108,482
Yunzhou	Datong	185,777
Yanggao	Datong	272,488
Tianzhen	Datong	206,009
Guangling	Datong	182,613
Lingqiu	Datong	234,004
Hunyuan	Datong	343,486
Zuoyun	Datong	156,163
Cheng(qu)	Yangquan	193,106
Kuang(qu)	Yangquan	242,994
Jiao(qu)	Yangquan	286,055
Pingding	Yangquan	335,265
Yu(xian)	Yangquan	311,082
Jiao(qu)→[Luzhou	Changzhi	281,213
Lucheng	Changzhi	226,874
Changzhi→Shangdang	Changzhi	340,963
Tunliu	Changzhi	263,844
Xiangyuan	Changzhi	270,216
Pingshun	Changzhi	150,955
Licheng	Changzhi	158,541
Huguan	Changzhi	291,609
Zhangzi	Changzhi	353,266
Wuxiang	Changzhi	182,548
Qin(xian)	Changzhi	172,205
Qinyuan	Changzhi	158,702
Cheng(qu)	Jincheng	476,945
Qinshui	Jincheng	213,022
Yangcheng	Jincheng	388,788
Lingchuan	Jincheng	231,360
Zezhou	Jincheng	484,174
Gaoping	Jincheng	484,862
Shuocheng	Shuozhou	505,294
Pinglu	Shuozhou	203,793
Shanyin	Shuozhou	238,885
Ying(xian)	Shuozhou	327,973
Youyu	Shuozhou	112,063
Huairen	Shuozhou	326,849
Yuci	Jinzhong	635651
Yushe	Jinzhong	134648
Zuoquan	Jinzhong	161314
Heshun	Jinzhong	144178
Xiyang	Jinzhong	227896
Shouyang	Jinzhong	211014
Taigu	Jinzhong	298783
Qi(xian)	Jinzhong	265310
Pingyao	Jinzhong	502712
Lingshi	Jinzhong	261402
Jiexiu	Jinzhong	406517
Yanhu	Yuncheng	680,043
Linyi	Yuncheng	57,251
Wanrong	Yuncheng	439,364
Wenxi	Yuncheng	404,146
Jishan	Yuncheng	347,425
Xinjiang	Yuncheng	332,473
Jiang(xian)	Yuncheng	281,644
Yuanqu	Yuncheng	231,018
Xiadu	Yuncheng	352,821
Pinglu	Yuncheng	258,241
Ruicheng	Yuncheng	394,854
Yongji	Yuncheng	444,724
Hejin	Yuncheng	395,531
Xinfu	Xinzhou	544,682
Dingxiang	Xinzhou	217,468
Wutai	Xinzhou	299,390
Dai(xian)	Xinzhou	214,091
Fanshi	Xinzhou	266,800
Ningwu	Xinzhou	161,165
Jingle	Xinzhou	156,846
Shenchi	Xinzhou	106,538
Wuzhai	Xinzhou	107,632
Kelan	Xinzhou	84,395
Hequ	Xinzhou	145,136
Baode	Xinzhou	160,035
Pianguan	Xinzhou	112,111
Yuanping	Xinzhou	491,213
Yaodu	Linfen	944,050
Quwo	Linfen	237,033
Yicheng	Linfen	311,471
Xiangfen	Linfen	442,614
Hongdong	Linfen	733,421
Gu(xian)	Linfen	91,798
Anze	Linfen	82,012
Fushan	Linfen	127,831
Ji(xian)	Linfen	106,407
Xiangning	Linfen	233,162
Pu(xian)	Linfen	107,339
Daning	Linfen	64,501
Yonghe	Linfen	63,649
Xi(xian)	Linfen	103,617
Fenxi	Linfen	144,795
Houma	Linfen	240,005
Huozhou	Linfen	282,907
Lishi	Lüliang	320,142
Wenshui	Lüliang	421,200
Jiaocheng	Lüliang	230,522
Xing(xian)	Lüliang	279,369
Lin(xian)	Lüliang	579,069
Liulin	Lüliang	320,681
Shilou	Lüliang	111,814
Lan(xian)	Lüliang	174,180
Fangshan	Lüliang	143,809
Zhongyang	Lüliang	141,374
Jiaokou	Lüliang	119,919
Xiaoyi	Lüliang	468,766
Fenyang	Lüliang	416,212
Kuang(qu) (disestablished)	Datong	500,158
Cheng(qu) (disestablished)	Changzhi	483,628
