= Gujiao =

City in Shanxi, China

Gujiao 古交市
- County-level city
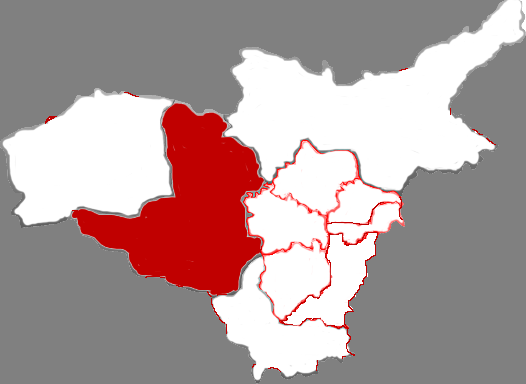
- Location in Taiyuan

- Location in Shanxi
- Coordinates: 37°54′25″N 112°10′34″E
- Country: People's Republic of China
- Province: Shanxi
- Prefecture-level city: Taiyuan

Area
  - County-level city: 1,512.0 km^{2} (583.8 sq mi)
  - Urban: 25.75 km^{2} (9.94 sq mi)

Population (2017)
  - County-level city: 252,000
  - Density: 167/km^{2} (432/sq mi)
  - Urban: 171,000
- Time zone: UTC+8 (China Standard)
- Postal code: 030200
- Area code: 351
- Website: www.sxgujiao.gov.cn

Gujiao (Chinese: 古交市; pinyin: Gǔjiāo Shì) is a county-level city of Shanxi Province, North China, it is under the administration of the prefecture-level city of Taiyuan. The estimated population of Gujiao in 2017 is about 222,000.

== Geography ==
Gujiao is located in central Shanxi. It's a county-level city, part of the prefecture-level city of Taiyuan, the capital of Shanxi province. Its geographical area is in between latitude of 37° 40'-38° 8' N, and longitude of 111° 43'-112° 21' E. It's connected to the Wanbailin District of Taiyuan to the east, Loufan County to the west, Yangqu County and Jingle County to the north and Qingxu County and Jiaocheng County to the south. Its east-west width is about 50 kilometers, and north–south length is about 53 kilometers. The total area of Gujiao is about 1551 square kilometres.

== Climate ==
Climate data for Gujiao, elevation 1,007 m (3,304 ft), (1991−2020 normal, extremes 1998–2010)
Month	Jan	Feb	Mar	Apr	May	Jun	Jul	Aug	Sep	Oct	Nov	Dec	Year
Record high °C (°F)	13.1 (55.6)	23.3 (73.9)	27.9 (82.2)	35.0 (95.0)	36.4 (97.5)	39.8 (103.6)	39.2 (102.6)	37.5 (99.5)	36.6 (97.9)	28.6 (83.5)	23.9 (75.0)	16.6 (61.9)	39.8 (103.6)
Mean daily maximum °C (°F)	2.4 (36.3)	6.5 (43.7)	12.7 (54.9)	20.0 (68.0)	25.5 (77.9)	29.3 (84.7)	30.2 (86.4)	28.3 (82.9)	23.8 (74.8)	17.8 (64.0)	10.1 (50.2)	3.4 (38.1)	17.5 (63.5)
Daily mean °C (°F)	−5.5 (22.1)	−1.6 (29.1)	4.7 (40.5)	11.8 (53.2)	17.6 (63.7)	21.5 (70.7)	23.3 (73.9)	21.5 (70.7)	16.4 (61.5)	9.9 (49.8)	2.5 (36.5)	−4.0 (24.8)	9.8 (49.7)
Mean daily minimum °C (°F)	−11.3 (11.7)	−7.7 (18.1)	−1.8 (28.8)	4.6 (40.3)	10.2 (50.4)	14.8 (58.6)	17.9 (64.2)	16.5 (61.7)	11.0 (51.8)	4.1 (39.4)	−2.9 (26.8)	−9.2 (15.4)	3.9 (38.9)
Record low °C (°F)	−22.4 (−8.3)	−19.1 (−2.4)	−14.8 (5.4)	−6.4 (20.5)	0.7 (33.3)	6.0 (42.8)	11.6 (52.9)	8.2 (46.8)	−0.3 (31.5)	−6.3 (20.7)	−18.3 (−0.9)	−21.5 (−6.7)	−22.4 (−8.3)
Average precipitation mm (inches)	1.6 (0.06)	3.8 (0.15)	8.5 (0.33)	22.4 (0.88)	30.9 (1.22)	55.5 (2.19)	103.9 (4.09)	95.2 (3.75)	60.1 (2.37)	28.6 (1.13)	11.8 (0.46)	1.7 (0.07)	424 (16.7)
Average precipitation days (≥ 1.0 mm)	1.9	2.5	3.3	5.5	6.5	10.2	12.7	11.5	8.7	6.1	3.6	1.5	74
Average snowy days	2.6	3.3	2.6	0.8	0	0	0	0	0	0.1	2.1	2.2	13.7
Average relative humidity (%)	46	44	41	43	45	56	67	71	69	62	55	48	54
Mean monthly sunshine hours	165.2	165.5	198.4	218.8	237.7	203.9	184.8	172.8	171.2	180.3	163.4	164.0	2,226
Percentage possible sunshine	54	54	53	55	54	46	42	42	47	53	54	56	51
Source: China Meteorological Data Service Center

== Demography ==
The population of Gujiao in 1999 stood at 192,458. Its estimated population in 2017 is about 222,000.

== Economy ==
The economy of Gujiao is largely based on coal-related industries, with major companies in coal, coal-chemistry, electricity, metallic parts casting, construction materials, etc. Gujiao is the largest production site of coking coal (metallurgical coal) in China.

== History ==
Gujiao was part of the State of Jin during the Spring and Autumn period, and part of Zhao in the Warring States period. It was the western part of Jinyang throughout the following dynasties of Han, Wei, Jin and Northern Dynasties.

During the Sui and Tang dynasties, the part of Gujiao to the south of Fen River, the majority part of nowadays Gujiao, was part of Jiaocheng County and the minor part to the north of Fen River was part of Yangqu County. In the year 596 AD in Sui dynasty, the western part of Jinyang was separated to set up the county of Jiaocheng, and the county seat was in Gujiao. In 691 AD, the county seat of Jiaocheng was moved to Dalingzhuang, part of today's Jiaocheng County, in order to get easier access of the national roads of Sui dynasty. In 713 AD, the northern part of Jiaocheng County is separated to set up Luchuan County, with the county seat at Luyukou at today's Gujiao. In 714, the Luchuan county was removed, and divided by the Fen River, Gujiao was split between Jiaocheng County and Yangqu County ever after, for more than one thousand years.

In 1958, Gujiao industrial and mining district (古交工矿区) of Taiyuan was established. In 1988, the district was replaced with a county-level city, and it has remained so ever since.

== Natural resources ==
Gujiao is abundant with many minerals, especially coal. The coal mine is about 754 square kilometres, with the coal reserve of about 8.04 billion tons. The iron core reserve is about 30 million tons. The bauxite reserve is about 65.9 million tons. The limestone reserve is about 5.6 million tons. The dolomite reserve is about 2.65 billion tons. The coalbed methane reserve is about 5.66 billion cubic meters.
