= Ma Yutao =

Chinese opera singer and general (born 1936)

Lieutenant General Ma Yutao
- 马玉涛
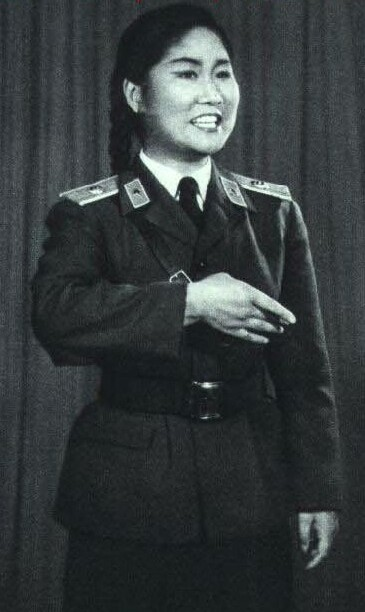
- Ma in 1964

Member of the National People's Congress
- In office January 1975 – February 1978

Personal details
- Born: February 1936 (age 90) Baode, Shanxi, Republic of China
- Party: Chinese Communist Party
- Education: Shanghai Institute of Vocal Music

Military service
- Branch/service: People's Liberation Army
- Years of service: 1950–present
- Rank: Lieutenant general
- Musical career
- Genres: Chinese opera, Hebei bangzi
- Instruments: Vocals
- Years active: 1955–present

Ma Yutao (Chinese: 马玉涛; pinyin: Mǎ Yùtāo; born February 1936) is a Chinese opera singer and military general. Ma has been a longtime member of the People's Liberation Army, and she represented the army in the National People's Congress. She holds the rank of lieutenant general.

== Biography ==
Ma Yutao was born in February 1936 in Baode, Shanxi. During her childhood, Ma was influenced by folk songs from Hequ. In 1950, at the age of fourteen, Ma enlisted in the People's Liberation Army as an actor, joining the Suiyuan Military Region Art Troupe. In 1955, she was reassigned to the Beijing Military Region Art Troupe, where she began practicing solo choral music. Ma attended the Shanghai Institute of Vocal Music in the late 1950s, studying under Lin Junqing. Lin introduced her to "vocal music, folk songs and operas" from various Chinese musicians, including Chang Xiangyu and Wang Kun, as well as the traditional operatic style Hebei bangzi.

Ma is a soprano opera singer, with a timbre described as being "generous, bright, and mellow". As a singer for the PLA, Ma has performed at military and government events, for disaster relief programs, and in various symphonies. Ma has won several competitions and awards throughout her career, including placing first in a "national solo recital held by the Ministry of Culture". Ma has represented China in several international singing competitions, including those held in Vienna, Paris, and the Soviet Union; she was also a member of Zhou Enlai's entourage during his tour of Europe and Asia. In 1976, Ma performed in the musical Songs of the Long March by Bayi Film Studio. She has also been a judge for several singing competitions, including the National Young Singer TV Grand Prix and the Golden Bell Awards.

Since joining the Chinese Communist Party in 1956, Ma has served in some political offices. From 1975 until 1978, she represented the PLA in the National People's Congress, and at some point was also a member of the National Committee of the Chinese People's Political Consultative Conference.

Ma holds the rank of lieutenant general in the People's Liberation Army, the "highest rank in the entertainment industry in China". Ma is a member of the China Federation of Literary and Art Circles and the Chinese Musicians' Association, and was a co-founder of the Chinese Music Group, which toured in Australia and the United States. As of 2016, Ma is the art director of the PLA Comrades in Arms Song and Dance Troupe.
