= CQU =

CQU or cqu may refer to:

- Central Queensland University in Australia
- Chongqing University in China
- Chilean Quechua (formerly ISO 639 code cqu) adialect of Quechua spoken in Bolivia, Chile, and Argentina
- Chengqu, Yangquan, a district of Yangquan city, Shanxi province, China; see List of administrative divisions of Shanxi
