= Shuitou =

Shuitou Town (水头镇) could refer to the following towns:

- Shuitou, Nan'an, Fujian, in Nan'an City
- Shuitou, Fogang County, in Fogang County, Guangdong
- Shuitou, Jiaokou County, Shanxi
- Shuitou, Xia County, in Xia County, Shanxi
- Shuitou, Pingyang County, in Pingyang County, Zhejiang

== Other places ==
- Shuitou Village in Kinmen Island, Fujian, R.O.C.
- Shuitou Pier, in Shuitou Village, the main passenger sea port of Kinmen Island
