= Wanjiazhai Dam =

Dam on the Yellow River, China

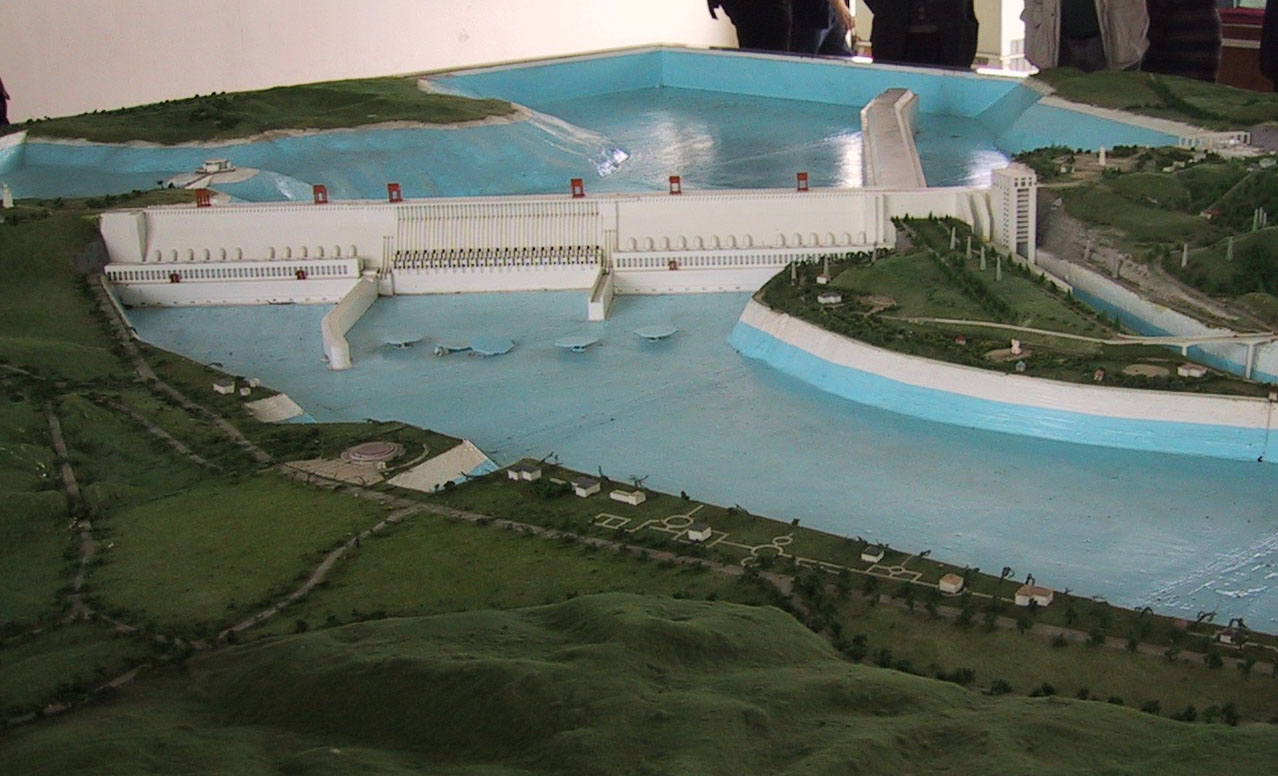

- Location within China
- Country: China
- Location: Border of Pianguan County, Shaanxi Province (east bank) and Inner Mongolia Autonomous Region (west bank)
- Coordinates: 39°34′42″N 111°25′42″E
- Status: In use
- Construction began: 1994
- Opening date: 1998
- Owner: Shanxi Wanjiazhai Yellow River Diversion Project Corporation

Dam and spillways
- Type of dam: Gravity, concrete
- Impounds: Yellow River
- Height: 105 m (344 ft)
- Length: 443 m (1,453 ft)
- Spillway type: Crest, controlled overflow

Reservoir
- Creates: Wanjiazhai Reservoir
- Total capacity: 896,000,000 m^{3} (726,399 acre⋅ft)
- Catchment area: 395,000 km^{2} (152,510 sq mi)

Power Station
- Turbines: 6 x 180 MW Francis turbines
- Installed capacity: 1,080 MW
- Annual generation: 2.75 TWh

The Wanjiazhai Dam is a gravity dam on the Yellow River on the border of Pianguan County, Shaanxi Province (east bank) and Inner Mongolia Autonomous Region (west bank), China. The main purpose of the dam is water supply for the Wanjiazhai Water Control Project along with peak hydroelectric power generation. Construction on the dam began in 1994, the first generator went online in 1998 and the last in 2000.

== Construction ==
The State Planning Commission approved construction of the dam in 1993. At the end of 1994, construction on the dam began and by December 1995, the river was diverted around the construction site. On October 1, 1998, the dam began to impound the reservoir and the first generator went online on November 28, 1998. Two more generators went online in 1999 and the final three in 2000.

== Dam design ==
The dam is a 105 m (344 ft) tall and 443 m (1,453 ft) long concrete gravity dam that withholds a reservoir with 896,000,000 m^{3} (726,399 acre⋅ft) of water, 445,000,000 m^{3} (360,767 acre⋅ft) of which is the regulating capacity. The dam's power plant contains 6 x 180 MW Francis Turbine-generators for an installed capacity of 1,080 MW.

== Wanjiazhai Water Control Project ==
Also known as the Wanjiazhai Water Transfer Project or Shanxi Wanjiazhai Yellow River Diversion Project, it is designed to alleviate water shortages in Taiyuan, Shuozhou and Datong and provide electricity for areas around the dam. First, water derived from the Wanjiazhai Dam's reservoir is pumped through the 44 km (27 mi) long General Main at a rate up to 48 m^{3}/s (1,695 cu ft/s), being assisted by three pump stations and the Shentongzui Reservoir along the way. At Xiatuzhai village, the General Main reaches a diversion sluice where it splits into the South Main and the North Main. Traveling at a rate of 20.5 m^{3}/s (724 cu ft/s), water moves through the South Main for a distance of 102 km (63 mi) to Fenhe River and then the Fenhe Reservoir 38°04′01″N 111°53′48″E near Taiyuan. The South Main is intended to deliver 640,000,000 m^{3} (518,856 acre⋅ft) of water a year. The North Main, beginning at Xiatuzhai, travels northward for a distance of 167 km (104 mi) at a rate of 22.2 m^{3}/s (784 cu ft/s), being assisted during its route by the Daliang Reservoir and pump station. The North Main terminates at the Zhaojiaxiaocun Reservoir near Datong.

Contracts for the water control project were awarded in 2001 and by the end of the year, the first step was complete when Yellow River water flowed into the Fehne Reservoir. The entire cost of the project is $1.5 billion, with $500 million being funded by the World Bank.

== See also ==
- List of power stations in China
