= Daning =

Daning or Da Ning may refer to:

- Daming (大明镇) in Inner Mongolia, China, formerly known as Daning (大宁) when it was the capital of the Ning Province of the Ming Empire
- Daning County (大宁县) in Shanxi, China
- Daning, Guangxi (大宁), a town in Hezhou, Guangxi, China
