= Wang Ning (politician, born 1966) =

Chinese politician

- 王宁

Communist Party Secretary of Liulin County
- In office January 2011 – November 2014

Personal details
- Born: July 1966 (age 60) Lin County, Shanxi, China
- Party: Chinese Communist Party (1986–2015; expelled)
- Education: Shanxi Central Party School of the Chinese Communist Party

Chinese name
- Traditional Chinese: 王寧
- Simplified Chinese: 王宁
Transcriptions
Standard Mandarin
- Hanyu Pinyin: Wāng Níng

Wang Ning (born July 1966) is a Chinese politician from Shanxi province. As of November 2014 he was under investigation by the Communist Party's anti-corruption agency. Previously he served as the party chief of Liulin County.

== Life and career ==
Wang was born and raised in Lin County, Shanxi. He graduated from Shanxi Central Party School of the Chinese Communist Party.

Wang began his political career in October 1984, and joined the Chinese Communist Party in March 1986.

Beginning in 1984, he served in several posts in Shanxi Military District, including soldier, assistant, and section chief.

Wang served as a secretary in General Office of CCP Shanxi Provincial Committee from December 1992 to January 1999.

In July 1999 he was promoted to become deputy party chief of Xiaoyi, a position he held until June 2006, then he was appointed the deputy party chief and magistrate of Jiaokou County, he remained in that position until November 2009, when he was transferred to Liulin County and appointed deputy party chief and magistrate. In January 2011, he was promoted to become party chief, the top political position in the County.

== Downfall ==
On November 12, 2014, he was being investigated by the Central Commission for Discipline Inspection for "serious violations of laws and regulations".

On February 15, 2015, he was expelled from the CCP and removed from public office.
