= Jiaokou =

Jiaokou may refer to:

- Jiaokou County, in Shanxi, China
- Jiaokou Station, in Guangzhou, Guangdong, China
