= Jiaoqu =

Jiaoqu (simplified Chinese: 郊区; traditional Chinese: 郊區; pinyin: Jiāoqū; lit. 'suburban district') may refer to the following locations in the People's Republic of China:

- Jiaoqu, Jiamusi, Heilongjiang
- Jiaoqu, Yangquan, Shanxi
