= Puxian =

Puxian may refer to:

- Pu–Xian Min, subcategory of Min languages
- Puxian Pavilion, at Shanhua Temple in Datong, Shanxi Province, China
- Puxian, Chinese name for Samantabhadra, a Bodhisattva in Mahayana Buddhism
- Puxian Wannu, 13th-century Jurchen warlord
- Pu County, or Puxian, in Shanxi, China
- Putian, or Puxian, a city in Fujian province, China
  - Putian people
