= Fenxi County =

Fenxi County 汾西县 Fensi
- County
- Location of the seat in Shanxi
- Coordinates: 36.653°N 111.564°E
- Country: People's Republic of China
- Province: Shanxi
- Prefecture-level city: Linfen

Area
  - Total: 880 km^{2} (340 sq mi)

Population (2019)
  - Total: 150,522
  - Density: 170/km^{2} (440/sq mi)
- Time zone: UTC+8 (China Standard)

Fenxi County (Chinese: 汾西; pinyin: Fénxī) is a county of Shanxi province, China. It is under the administration of Linfen city. The county spans an area of 880 square kilometres (340 mi^{2}), and has a permanent population of 150,522 as of 2019.

== Toponymy ==
Fenxi literally means west (Chinese: 西; pinyin: xī) of the Fen River (Chinese: 汾; pinyin: fén), due to the county's location along the western banks of the Fen River.

== History ==
According to the Yuanhe Maps and Records of Prefectures and Counties, the area of present-day Fenxi County was once known as Yicheng (simplified Chinese: 义城; traditional Chinese: 義城; pinyin: Yìchéng).

The Western Han organized the area as Zhi County (simplified Chinese: 彘县; traditional Chinese: 彘縣; pinyin: Zhì Xiàn), which the Eastern Han changed to Yong'an County (simplified Chinese: 永安县; traditional Chinese: 永安縣; pinyin: Yǒng'ān Xiàn).

The Northern Wei reorganized the area was Fenxi Commandery (Chinese: 汾西郡; pinyin: Fénxī Jùn).

During the Song dynasty, the area belonged to Pingyang Fu.

In the Jin dynasty, the area belonged to Huo Zhou.

During the Yuan dynasty, the area belonged to Jinning Lu.

Under the Ming dynasty and the Qing dynasty, the area was administered again under Pingyang Fu.

=== People's Republic of China ===
In 1949, the area fell under the jurisdiction of Linfen Prefecture, which was renamed to Jinnan Prefecture in 1954. The current iteration of Fenxi County was established in 1961.

== Geography ==
Fenxi County is located along the west bank of the Fen River, and along the southeastern portion of the Lüliang Mountains. The county's terrain is higher in the northwest, lower in the southeast, and generally characteristic of the Loess Plateau The county's highest point is Xigushe Mountain (Chinese: 西姑射山; pinyin: Xīgūshè Shān), at 1,890 metres (6,200 ft) above sea level; the county's lowest point is in southern Tuanbai Township, at 583 metres (1,913 ft) above sea level.

Major rivers in Fenxi County include the Fen River, the Tuanbaijian River (Chinese: 团柏涧河; pinyin: Tuánbǎijiàn Hé), and the Duizhu River (Chinese: 对竹河; pinyin: Duìzhú Hé).

== Climate ==
Climate data for Fenxi, elevation 1,012 m (3,320 ft), (1991–2020 normals, extremes 1981–present)
Month	Jan	Feb	Mar	Apr	May	Jun	Jul	Aug	Sep	Oct	Nov	Dec	Year
Record high °C (°F)	12.9 (55.2)	18.3 (64.9)	26.1 (79.0)	31.7 (89.1)	34.7 (94.5)	38.1 (100.6)	37.6 (99.7)	34.5 (94.1)	34.7 (94.5)	27.7 (81.9)	22.1 (71.8)	14.6 (58.3)	38.1 (100.6)
Mean daily maximum °C (°F)	1.6 (34.9)	5.5 (41.9)	11.8 (53.2)	18.9 (66.0)	24.2 (75.6)	28.2 (82.8)	29.0 (84.2)	27.2 (81.0)	22.4 (72.3)	16.4 (61.5)	9.1 (48.4)	2.8 (37.0)	16.4 (61.6)
Daily mean °C (°F)	−3.4 (25.9)	0.2 (32.4)	6.0 (42.8)	12.8 (55.0)	18.2 (64.8)	22.2 (72.0)	23.7 (74.7)	22.1 (71.8)	17.3 (63.1)	11.3 (52.3)	4.2 (39.6)	−2.0 (28.4)	11.0 (51.9)
Mean daily minimum °C (°F)	−7.0 (19.4)	−3.8 (25.2)	1.4 (34.5)	7.5 (45.5)	12.8 (55.0)	17.1 (62.8)	19.3 (66.7)	18.1 (64.6)	13.3 (55.9)	7.2 (45.0)	0.5 (32.9)	−5.4 (22.3)	6.8 (44.1)
Record low °C (°F)	−19.8 (−3.6)	−18.5 (−1.3)	−13.4 (7.9)	−4.3 (24.3)	2.6 (36.7)	8.7 (47.7)	12.5 (54.5)	9.4 (48.9)	2.1 (35.8)	−6.1 (21.0)	−14.5 (5.9)	−19.2 (−2.6)	−19.8 (−3.6)
Average precipitation mm (inches)	5.9 (0.23)	8.3 (0.33)	13.0 (0.51)	31.5 (1.24)	37.6 (1.48)	61.6 (2.43)	125.9 (4.96)	109.8 (4.32)	73.2 (2.88)	39.1 (1.54)	16.4 (0.65)	3.8 (0.15)	526.1 (20.72)
Average precipitation days (≥ 0.1 mm)	2.6	3.3	4.2	5.9	6.9	9.3	12.0	10.8	8.9	6.8	4.3	2.2	77.2
Average snowy days	3.8	4.4	3.0	0.7	0	0	0	0	0	0.1	2.2	3.0	17.2
Average relative humidity (%)	45	46	44	45	47	54	68	71	68	60	54	46	54
Mean monthly sunshine hours	173.0	171.4	202.3	228.4	248.1	224.3	206.9	196.2	175.7	186.5	174.0	174.9	2,361.7
Percentage possible sunshine	56	56	54	58	57	51	47	47	48	54	57	59	54
Source: China Meteorological Administration

== Administrative divisions ==
Fenxi County administers 5 towns and 3 townships.

=== Towns ===
Fenxi County's 5 towns are Yong'an, Duizhu, Qingxiang, Heping, and Sengnian.

=== Townships ===
Fenxi County's 3 townships are Dianping Township, Tuanbai Township, and Xingjiayao Township.

== Demographics ==
Fenxi County has a sex ratio of 108.15 males per 100 females.

As of 2019, 71,924 people in Fenxi County, or 47.78% of the population, lived in urban areas; 78,598 people, or 52.22% of the population, lived in rural areas. The county's most populous village-level division, as of 2019, is Xiatuanbai (Chinese: 下团柏村), with a population of 3,360; the county's least populous village-level division is Goudi (Chinese: 沟底村), with a population of 320.

The population of 150,522 reported in 2019 is up from the 144,791 reported in the 2010 Chinese Census. In the 2000 Chinese Census, Fenxi County's population was 133,836. A 1996 estimate put the county's population at about 120,000.

== See also ==
- Linfen
