= Wuzhai County =

Wuzhai County 五寨县
- County
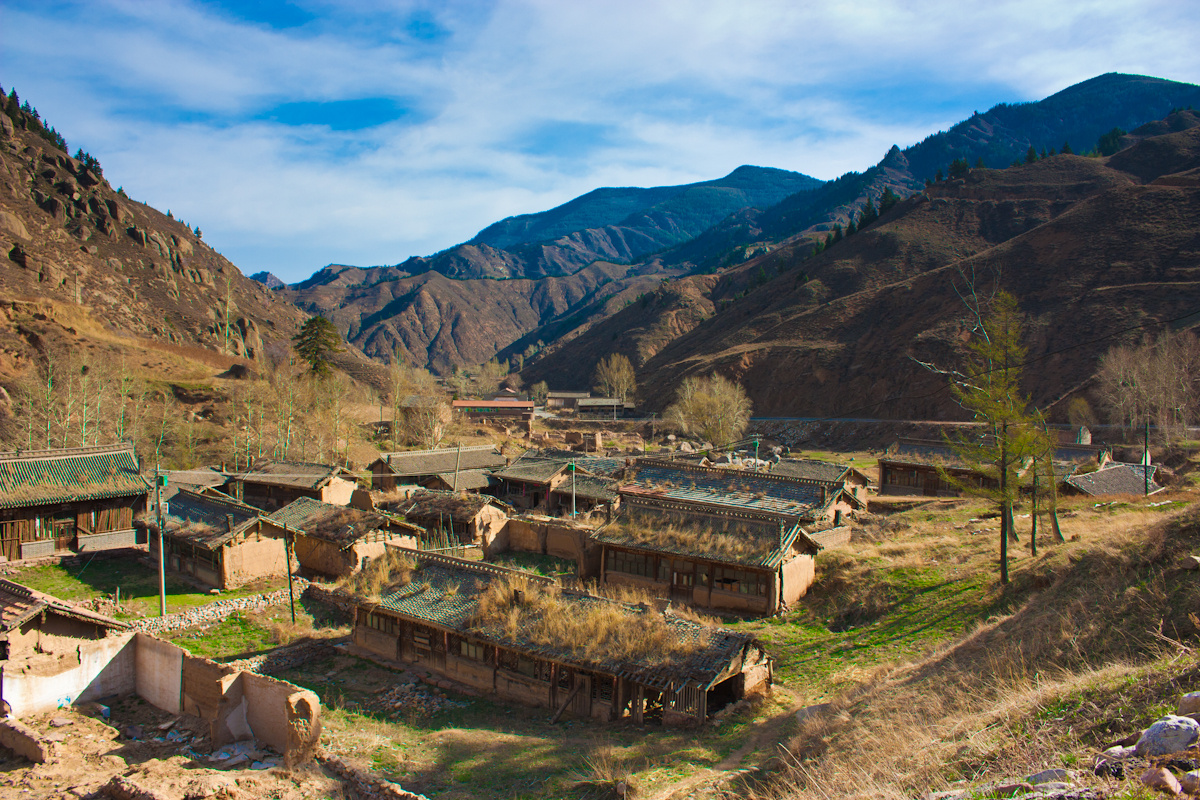

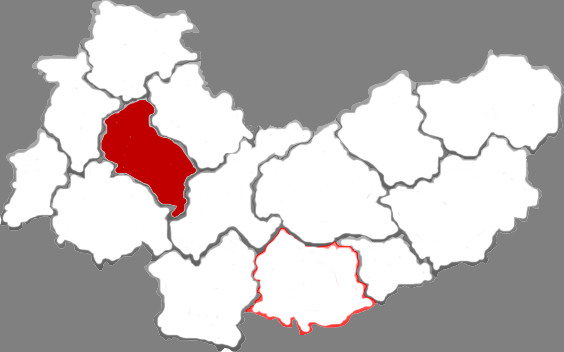
- Wuzhai in Xinzhou

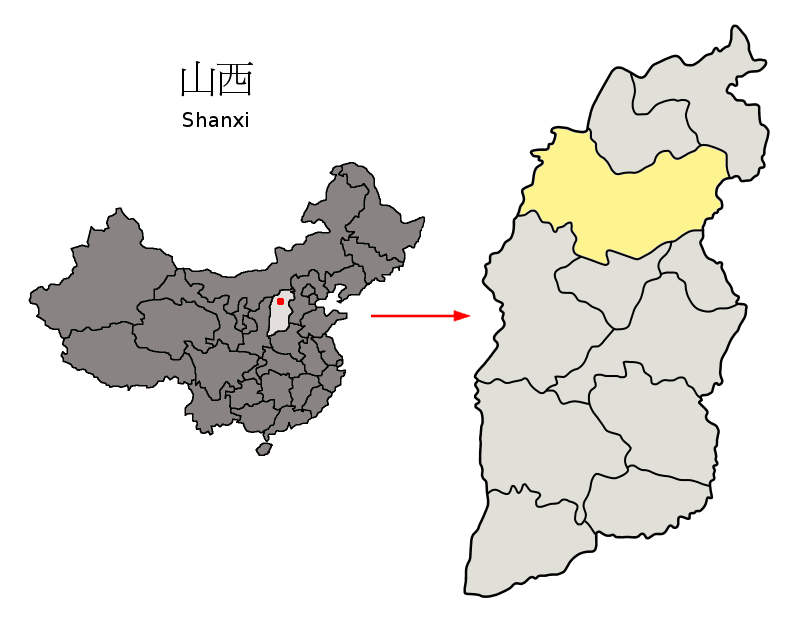
- Xinzhou in Shanxi
- Coordinates: 38°54′39″N 111°50′49″E
- Country: People's Republic of China
- Province: Shanxi
- Prefecture-level city: Xinzhou
- Time zone: UTC+8 (China Standard)
- Postal code: 036200

Wuzhai (Chinese: 五寨; pinyin: Wǔzhài; lit. 'five villages') is a county of northwestern Shanxi province, China. It is under the administration of Xinzhou City.

== Climate ==
Wuzhai has a monsoon-influenced, humid continental climate (Köppen Dwb), with cold and very dry winters, and warm, humid summers. The monthly 24-hour average temperature ranges from −12.2 °C (10.0 °F) in January to 20.2 °C (68.4 °F) in July, and the annual mean is 5.4 °C (41.7 °F). June thru September accounts for nearly three-fourths of the 454 millimetres (17.9 in) of annual precipitation. Due to the high elevation and dry climate, the diurnal temperature variation averages 15 °C (27 °F) annually.

Climate data for Wuzhai, elevation 1,401 m (4,596 ft), (1991–2020 normals, extremes 1971–2010)
Month	Jan	Feb	Mar	Apr	May	Jun	Jul	Aug	Sep	Oct	Nov	Dec	Year
Record high °C (°F)	14.1 (57.4)	18.6 (65.5)	25.3 (77.5)	33.1 (91.6)	32.5 (90.5)	36.7 (98.1)	35.7 (96.3)	32.9 (91.2)	32.4 (90.3)	26.6 (79.9)	20.9 (69.6)	15.7 (60.3)	36.7 (98.1)
Mean daily maximum °C (°F)	−2.4 (27.7)	1.8 (35.2)	8.4 (47.1)	16.2 (61.2)	22.1 (71.8)	25.9 (78.6)	27.0 (80.6)	25.3 (77.5)	20.9 (69.6)	14.2 (57.6)	6.2 (43.2)	−0.9 (30.4)	13.7 (56.7)
Daily mean °C (°F)	−11.6 (11.1)	−7.0 (19.4)	0.3 (32.5)	8.3 (46.9)	14.7 (58.5)	19.0 (66.2)	20.4 (68.7)	18.2 (64.8)	13.1 (55.6)	6.1 (43.0)	−2.1 (28.2)	−9.5 (14.9)	5.8 (42.5)
Mean daily minimum °C (°F)	−18.1 (−0.6)	−13.5 (7.7)	−6.3 (20.7)	0.3 (32.5)	6.4 (43.5)	11.2 (52.2)	13.6 (56.5)	11.9 (53.4)	6.4 (43.5)	−0.2 (31.6)	−7.8 (18.0)	−15.4 (4.3)	−1.0 (30.3)
Record low °C (°F)	−32.7 (−26.9)	−30.8 (−23.4)	−28.1 (−18.6)	−14.6 (5.7)	−8.1 (17.4)	−0.5 (31.1)	4.1 (39.4)	0.3 (32.5)	−6.1 (21.0)	−13.4 (7.9)	−28.6 (−19.5)	−35.4 (−31.7)	−35.4 (−31.7)
Average precipitation mm (inches)	3.7 (0.15)	6.6 (0.26)	9.6 (0.38)	24.8 (0.98)	39.8 (1.57)	66.0 (2.60)	109.0 (4.29)	111.0 (4.37)	66.3 (2.61)	31.3 (1.23)	13.1 (0.52)	3.7 (0.15)	484.9 (19.11)
Average precipitation days (≥ 0.1 mm)	3.8	4.1	4.6	5.7	8.4	11.8	13.4	12.7	10.4	7.3	5.2	3.5	90.9
Average snowy days	6.6	6.0	5.5	2.4	0.3	0	0	0	0	1.5	5.4	6.4	34.1
Average relative humidity (%)	58	54	48	42	42	52	68	74	70	64	60	58	58
Mean monthly sunshine hours	186.2	183.7	222.6	237.9	263.9	242.5	236.0	217.4	206.4	212.2	189.5	181.8	2,580.1
Percentage possible sunshine	61	60	60	60	60	55	53	52	56	62	64	62	59
Source 1: China Meteorological Administration
Source 2: Weather China
