= Shilou County =

Coordinates: 36°59′57″N 110°50′03″E

Shilou County 石楼县 Shihlow
- County
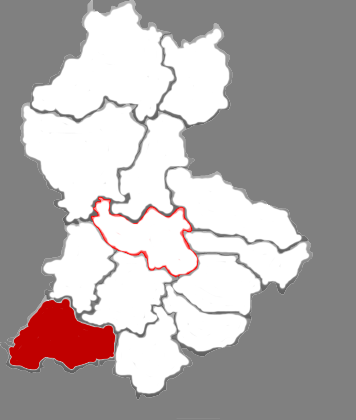
- Shilou in Lüliang

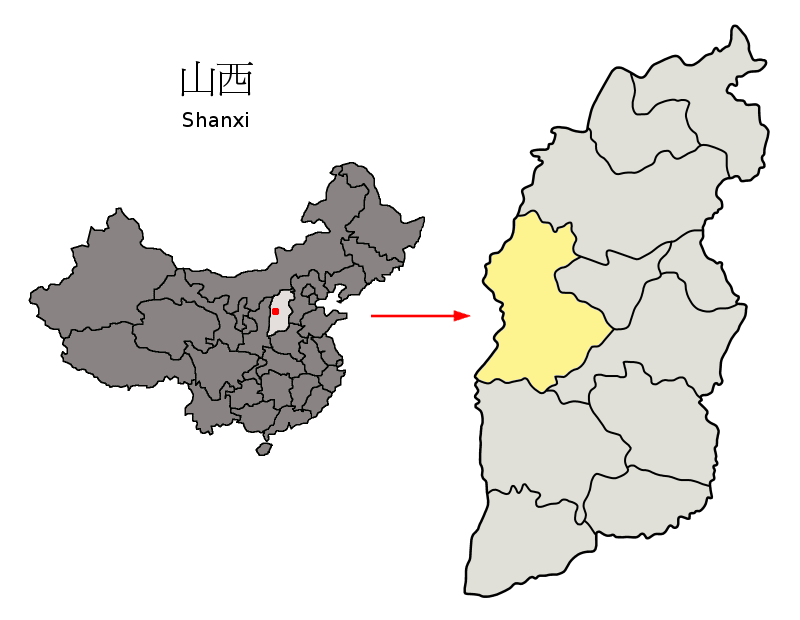
- Lüliang in Shanxi
- Country: People's Republic of China
- Province: Shanxi
- Prefecture-level city: Lüliang

Population (2020)
  - Total: 96,808
- Time zone: UTC+8 (China Standard)

Shilou County (simplified Chinese: 石楼县; traditional Chinese: 石樓縣; pinyin: Shílóu Xiàn) is a county in the west of Shanxi province, China, bordering Shaanxi province across the Yellow River to the west. It is under the administration of Lüliang City.

== Climate ==
Climate data for Shilou, elevation 1,109 m (3,638 ft), (1991–2020 normals, extremes 1981–2010)
Month	Jan	Feb	Mar	Apr	May	Jun	Jul	Aug	Sep	Oct	Nov	Dec	Year
Record high °C (°F)	15.6 (60.1)	22.4 (72.3)	28.3 (82.9)	32.4 (90.3)	34.9 (94.8)	36.3 (97.3)	36.5 (97.7)	34.7 (94.5)	35.3 (95.5)	27.9 (82.2)	22.6 (72.7)	15.3 (59.5)	36.5 (97.7)
Mean daily maximum °C (°F)	−0.6 (30.9)	4.5 (40.1)	11.5 (52.7)	19.0 (66.2)	24.4 (75.9)	28.3 (82.9)	29.3 (84.7)	27.1 (80.8)	22.3 (72.1)	16.0 (60.8)	8.5 (47.3)	1.2 (34.2)	16.0 (60.7)
Daily mean °C (°F)	−5.8 (21.6)	−1.2 (29.8)	5.4 (41.7)	12.6 (54.7)	18.1 (64.6)	22.1 (71.8)	23.6 (74.5)	21.7 (71.1)	16.9 (62.4)	10.5 (50.9)	3.1 (37.6)	−3.9 (25.0)	10.3 (50.5)
Mean daily minimum °C (°F)	−9.8 (14.4)	−5.6 (21.9)	0.4 (32.7)	6.9 (44.4)	12.0 (53.6)	16.5 (61.7)	18.8 (65.8)	17.3 (63.1)	12.5 (54.5)	6.1 (43.0)	−0.9 (30.4)	−7.8 (18.0)	5.5 (42.0)
Record low °C (°F)	−22.0 (−7.6)	−18.5 (−1.3)	−15.5 (4.1)	−5.5 (22.1)	1.2 (34.2)	6.4 (43.5)	10.5 (50.9)	10.4 (50.7)	0.7 (33.3)	−7.3 (18.9)	−17.4 (0.7)	−22.6 (−8.7)	−22.6 (−8.7)
Average precipitation mm (inches)	3.7 (0.15)	6.6 (0.26)	10.8 (0.43)	27.6 (1.09)	34.2 (1.35)	54.3 (2.14)	111.4 (4.39)	121.3 (4.78)	74.3 (2.93)	37.9 (1.49)	16.2 (0.64)	3.2 (0.13)	501.5 (19.78)
Average precipitation days (≥ 0.1 mm)	2.7	3.2	4.0	5.7	7.6	9.1	12.1	11.5	9.1	7.2	4.4	2.5	79.1
Average snowy days	3.6	3.6	2.3	0.4	0	0	0	0	0	0.3	2.5	2.9	15.6
Average relative humidity (%)	53	48	43	42	44	53	66	71	68	62	56	53	55
Mean monthly sunshine hours	187.5	178.2	212.7	233.7	257.7	239.2	228.3	211.4	191.3	199.7	186.1	190.7	2,516.5
Percentage possible sunshine	61	58	57	59	59	55	52	51	52	58	62	64	57
Source: China Meteorological Administration
