= Shuitou, Jiaokou County =

Shuitou 水头镇
- Town
- Location within Shanxi
- Coordinates: 36°58′54″N 111°11′09″E
- Country: China
- Province: Shanxi
- Prefecture-level city: Lvliang
- County: Jiaokou County

Population (2000)
  - Total: 24,210
- Time zone: UTC+8 (China Standard)
- Postal code: 032400
- Area code: 0358

Shuitou (simplified Chinese: 水头; traditional Chinese: 水頭; pinyin: Shuǐtóu) is a town in and the county seat of Jiaokou County, southwestern Shanxi province, North China. It was formerly named Chéngguān (城关 / 城關) until 2001, when the county reorganised its administrative divisions.
