= Xia County =

County of Shanxi, China

Xia County 夏县
- County
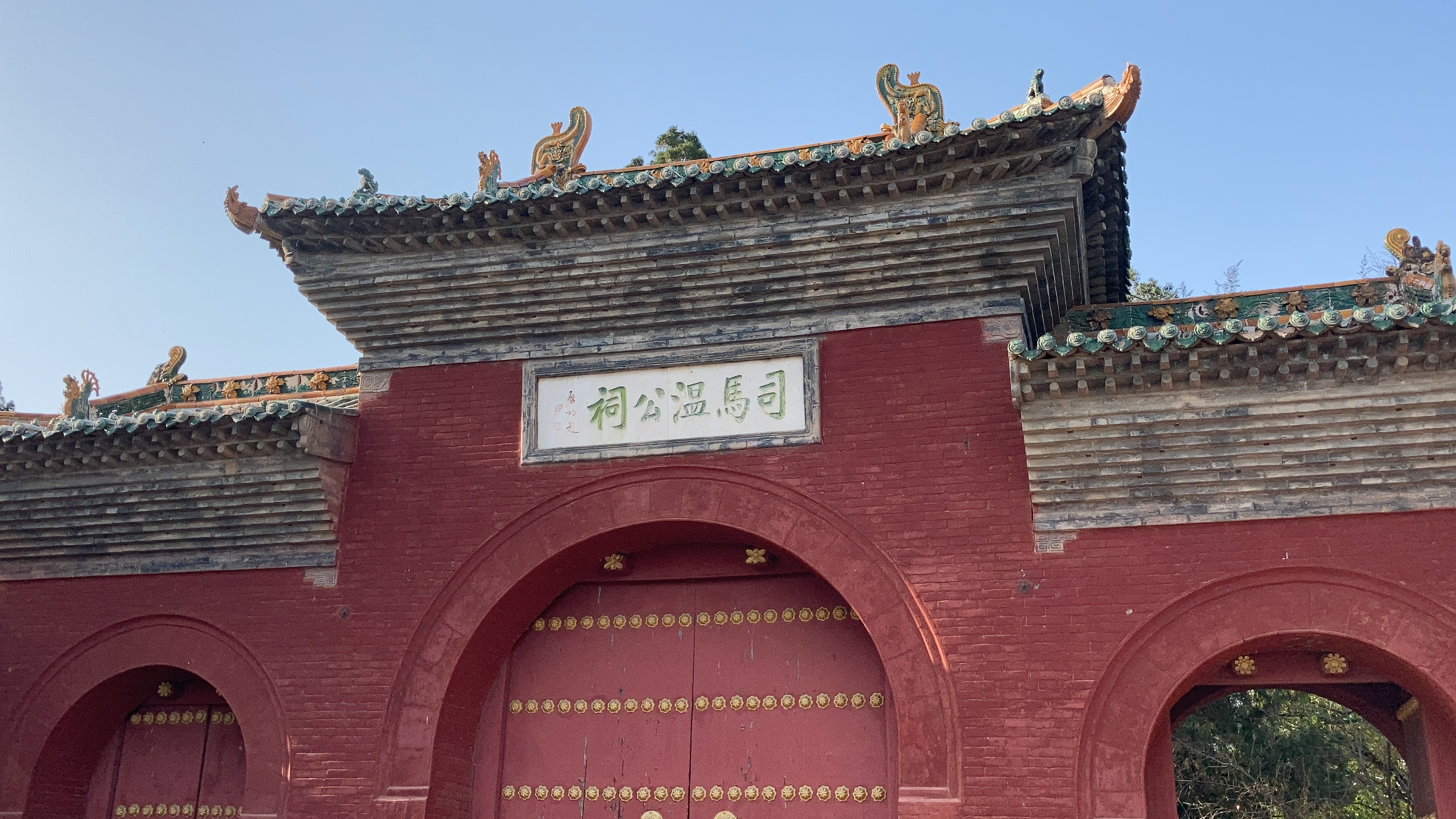
- Sima Wengong Temple

- Location of the seat in Shanxi
- Coordinates: 35°08′18″N 111°13′15″E
- Country: People's Republic of China
- Province: Shanxi
- Prefecture-level city: Yuncheng

Population (2020)
  - Total: 287,938
- Time zone: UTC+8 (China Standard)
- Website: www.sxxiaxian.gov.cn

Xia County or Xiaxian (simplified Chinese: 夏县; traditional Chinese: 夏縣; pinyin: Xià Xiàn) is a county in the southwest of Shanxi province, People's Republic of China, bordering Henan province to the southeast. It is under the jurisdiction of Yuncheng City.

== History ==
In ancient China, it served as the previous capitals of the Xia dynasty and the Wei kingdom, and was previously known as Mingtiao. It was the site of the Battle of Mingtiao, which took place in about 1600 BCE.

A notable site in the county is Sima Wengong Temple (司馬溫公祠), the family home and burial place of Sima Guang, a Song dynasty historian.

== Climate ==
Climate data for Xiaxian, elevation 403 m (1,322 ft), (1991–2020 normals, extremes 1981–present)
| Month | Jan | Feb | Mar | Apr | May | Jun | Jul | Aug | Sep | Oct | Nov | Dec | Year |
|---|---|---|---|---|---|---|---|---|---|---|---|---|---|
| Record high °C (°F) | 15.4 (59.7) | 23.9 (75.0) | 30.5 (86.9) | 36.5 (97.7) | 39.3 (102.7) | 40.7 (105.3) | 40.9 (105.6) | 38.7 (101.7) | 38.8 (101.8) | 32.5 (90.5) | 26.0 (78.8) | 17.1 (62.8) | 40.9 (105.6) |
| Mean daily maximum °C (°F) | 5.3 (41.5) | 9.9 (49.8) | 16.2 (61.2) | 22.8 (73.0) | 27.7 (81.9) | 32.0 (89.6) | 32.7 (90.9) | 30.9 (87.6) | 26.3 (79.3) | 20.4 (68.7) | 13.0 (55.4) | 6.6 (43.9) | 20.3 (68.6) |
| Daily mean °C (°F) | −2.0 (28.4) | 2.4 (36.3) | 8.8 (47.8) | 15.4 (59.7) | 20.6 (69.1) | 25.4 (77.7) | 27.1 (80.8) | 25.3 (77.5) | 20.2 (68.4) | 13.5 (56.3) | 5.7 (42.3) | −0.8 (30.6) | 13.5 (56.2) |
| Mean daily minimum °C (°F) | −7.7 (18.1) | −3.6 (25.5) | 2.2 (36.0) | 8.1 (46.6) | 13.4 (56.1) | 18.6 (65.5) | 21.8 (71.2) | 20.4 (68.7) | 15.1 (59.2) | 8.0 (46.4) | 0.2 (32.4) | −6.2 (20.8) | 7.5 (45.5) |
| Record low °C (°F) | −18.8 (−1.8) | −19.8 (−3.6) | −13.2 (8.2) | −5.1 (22.8) | 1.2 (34.2) | 6.7 (44.1) | 12.6 (54.7) | 11.5 (52.7) | 1.2 (34.2) | −6.9 (19.6) | −15.1 (4.8) | −18.3 (−0.9) | −19.8 (−3.6) |
| Average precipitation mm (inches) | 5.1 (0.20) | 8.3 (0.33) | 13.3 (0.52) | 35.8 (1.41) | 50.8 (2.00) | 56.0 (2.20) | 95.4 (3.76) | 90.0 (3.54) | 79.5 (3.13) | 52.5 (2.07) | 23.1 (0.91) | 3.8 (0.15) | 513.6 (20.22) |
| Average precipitation days (≥ 0.1 mm) | 2.8 | 3.1 | 4.0 | 6.5 | 7.6 | 7.7 | 9.2 | 9.3 | 9.8 | 7.7 | 5.3 | 2.2 | 75.2 |
| Average snowy days | 3.7 | 2.8 | 1.2 | 0.1 | 0 | 0 | 0 | 0 | 0 | 0 | 1.2 | 2.6 | 11.6 |
| Average relative humidity (%) | 60 | 58 | 55 | 58 | 59 | 58 | 69 | 74 | 74 | 74 | 71 | 64 | 65 |
| Mean monthly sunshine hours | 147.6 | 151.5 | 186.5 | 220.3 | 239.5 | 229.8 | 234.1 | 213.6 | 171.9 | 164.3 | 152.1 | 154.7 | 2,265.9 |
| Percentage possible sunshine | 47 | 49 | 50 | 56 | 55 | 53 | 53 | 52 | 47 | 48 | 50 | 51 | 51 |
Source: China Meteorological Administration all-time extreme temperature

== See also ==
- List of administrative divisions of Shanxi
