= Liulin County =

Liulin County 柳林县
- County
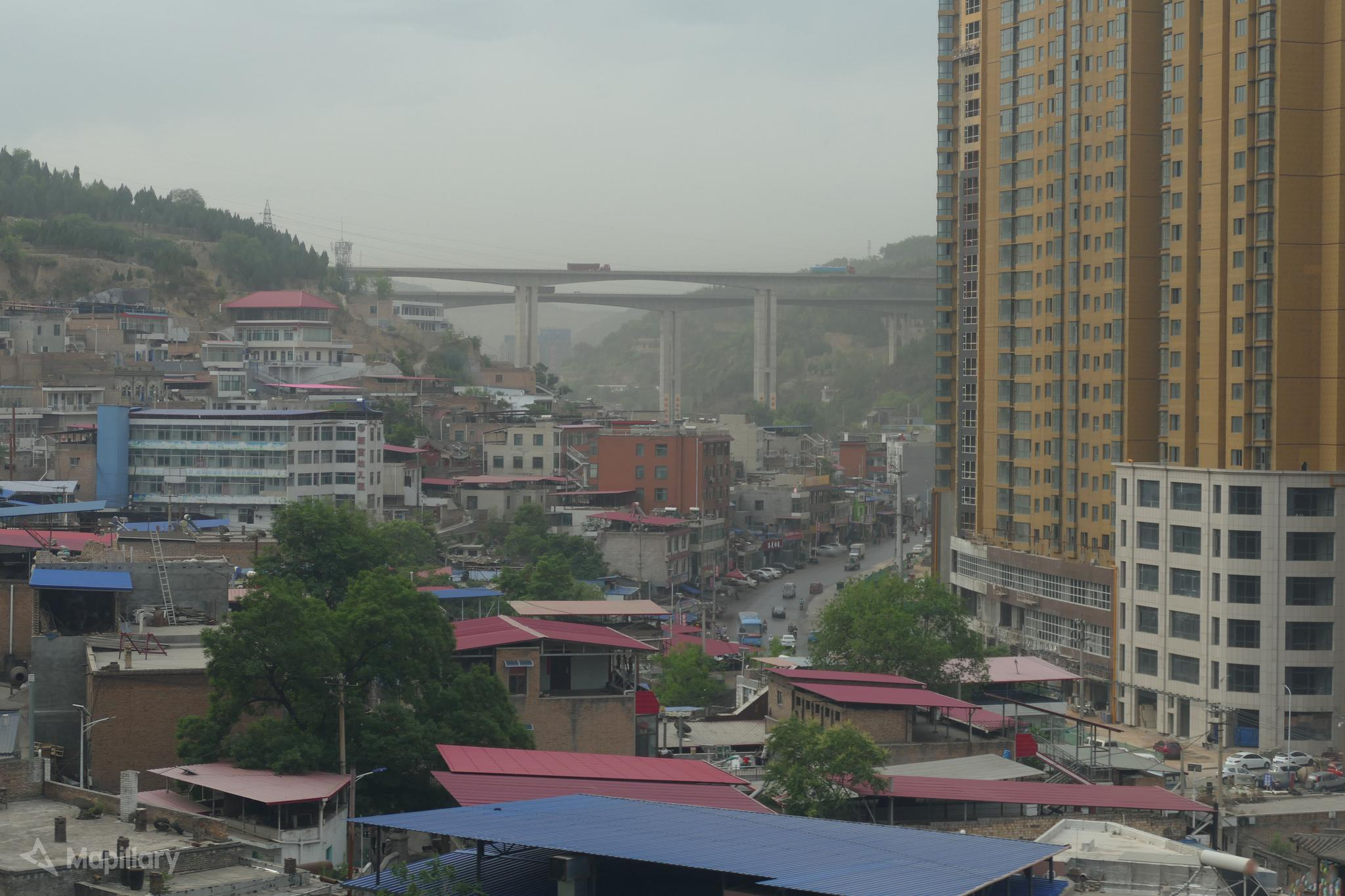

- Location in Shanxi
- Coordinates: 37°25′51″N 110°53′21″E
- Country: People's Republic of China
- Province: Shanxi
- Prefecture-level city: Lüliang

Area
  - Total: 1,288 km^{2} (497 sq mi)

Population (2020)
  - Total: 287,969
  - Density: 223.6/km^{2} (579.1/sq mi)
- Time zone: UTC+8 (China Standard)

Liulin (Chinese: 柳林; pinyin: Liǔlín is a county of western Shanxi province, China, bordering Shaanxi province and the Yellow River to the west. It is under the administration of Lüliang city. The county is the site of the Xiangyan Temple (zh).

Liulin has been inhabited since the Neolithic era. During the Han dynasty the county seat was in Mengmen town. It is the birthplace of Lin Xiangru and Red Army general He Chang (贺昌). It has historically been a trade town between the Central Plains and the Silk Road.

It is a center of coal industry, jujube and walnut cultivation.

Its regional cuisines include Liulin Wantuan, a steamed buckwheat noodle, and sesame cakes.

== Administrative divisions ==
Name	Chinese name	Population (2018)
Liulin Town	柳林镇	90,486
Mucun Town	穆村镇	26,615
Xuecun Town	薛村镇	21,828
Zhuangshang Town	庄上镇	17,307
Liuyu Town	留誉镇	18,960
Sanjiao Town	三交镇	22,350
Chengjiazhuang Town	成家庄镇	15,895
Mengmen Town	孟门镇	19,096
Lijiawan Township	李家湾乡	14,592
Jiajiayuan Township	贾家垣乡	17,500
Chenjiawan Township	陈家湾乡	23,252
Jinjiazhuang Township	金家庄乡	12,894
Gaojiagou Township	高家沟乡	18,961
Shixi Township	石西乡	11,879
Wangjiagou Township	王家沟乡	14,490

== Climate ==
Climate data for Liulin, elevation 860 m (2,820 ft), (1991–2020 normals, extremes 1981–2010)
Month	Jan	Feb	Mar	Apr	May	Jun	Jul	Aug	Sep	Oct	Nov	Dec	Year
Record high °C (°F)	13.2 (55.8)	22.4 (72.3)	29.7 (85.5)	37.0 (98.6)	37.2 (99.0)	40.2 (104.4)	39.9 (103.8)	36.9 (98.4)	37.5 (99.5)	30.0 (86.0)	22.7 (72.9)	16.0 (60.8)	40.2 (104.4)
Mean daily maximum °C (°F)	0.7 (33.3)	6.0 (42.8)	13.3 (55.9)	21.0 (69.8)	26.5 (79.7)	30.5 (86.9)	31.4 (88.5)	29.2 (84.6)	24.2 (75.6)	17.7 (63.9)	9.7 (49.5)	2.3 (36.1)	17.7 (63.9)
Daily mean °C (°F)	−5.8 (21.6)	−0.9 (30.4)	6.2 (43.2)	13.6 (56.5)	19.3 (66.7)	23.6 (74.5)	25.1 (77.2)	23.1 (73.6)	17.8 (64.0)	10.9 (51.6)	3.2 (37.8)	−4.0 (24.8)	11.0 (51.8)
Mean daily minimum °C (°F)	−10.4 (13.3)	−5.9 (21.4)	0.5 (32.9)	7.2 (45.0)	12.7 (54.9)	17.4 (63.3)	20.0 (68.0)	18.3 (64.9)	13.0 (55.4)	6.1 (43.0)	−1.2 (29.8)	−8.2 (17.2)	5.8 (42.4)
Record low °C (°F)	−23.5 (−10.3)	−19.7 (−3.5)	−14.0 (6.8)	−4.7 (23.5)	2.2 (36.0)	8.0 (46.4)	10.5 (50.9)	10.3 (50.5)	1.0 (33.8)	−6.7 (19.9)	−16.5 (2.3)	−22.4 (−8.3)	−23.5 (−10.3)
Average precipitation mm (inches)	3.3 (0.13)	5.6 (0.22)	11.3 (0.44)	25.0 (0.98)	34.7 (1.37)	54.2 (2.13)	112.5 (4.43)	111.5 (4.39)	70.0 (2.76)	34.4 (1.35)	14.9 (0.59)	3.3 (0.13)	480.7 (18.92)
Average precipitation days (≥ 0.1 mm)	2.3	2.8	4.2	5.5	6.7	8.8	11.2	11.0	8.7	6.9	4.2	2.4	74.7
Average snowy days	2.7	2.7	1.7	0.3	0	0	0	0	0	0.1	1.7	2.7	11.9
Average relative humidity (%)	55	50	43	41	43	50	62	67	68	64	61	57	55
Mean monthly sunshine hours	172.7	173.5	213.0	234.2	256.8	238.2	227.3	215.6	193.4	195.8	174.0	172.5	2,467
Percentage possible sunshine	56	56	57	59	58	54	51	52	53	57	58	58	56
Source: China Meteorological Administration

== See also ==
- Wang Ning, county party boss who was investigated for corruption
