= Pianguan County =

Pianguan County 偏关县 Pienkwan
- County
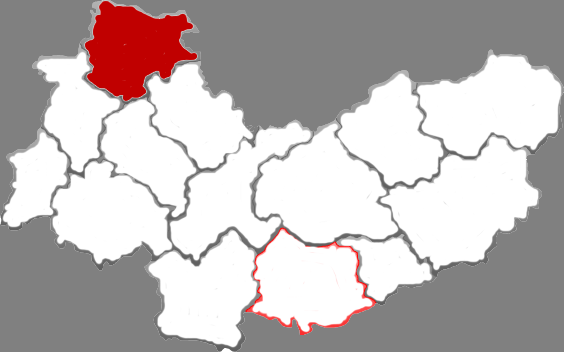
- Location in Xinzhou

- Location of the seat in Shanxi
- Coordinates: 39°26′06″N 111°30′45″E
- Country: People's Republic of China
- Province: Shanxi
- Prefecture-level city: Xinzhou
- Time zone: UTC+8 (China Standard)

Pianguan County (simplified Chinese: 偏关县; traditional Chinese: 偏關縣; pinyin: Piānguān Xiàn) is a county in the northwest of Shanxi province, China, bordering Inner Mongolia to the northwest. It is under the administration of Xinzhou city, and is its northernmost county-level division.

== Climate ==
Climate data for Pianguan, elevation 1,052 m (3,451 ft), (1991–2020 normals, extremes 1981–2010)
Month	Jan	Feb	Mar	Apr	May	Jun	Jul	Aug	Sep	Oct	Nov	Dec	Year
Record high °C (°F)	9.7 (49.5)	19.5 (67.1)	27.5 (81.5)	35.0 (95.0)	35.2 (95.4)	41.0 (105.8)	39.5 (103.1)	36.4 (97.5)	35.4 (95.7)	28.0 (82.4)	21.3 (70.3)	14.8 (58.6)	41.0 (105.8)
Mean daily maximum °C (°F)	−1.9 (28.6)	3.4 (38.1)	10.7 (51.3)	18.8 (65.8)	24.9 (76.8)	29.2 (84.6)	30.7 (87.3)	28.5 (83.3)	23.3 (73.9)	16.1 (61.0)	7.4 (45.3)	−0.3 (31.5)	15.9 (60.6)
Daily mean °C (°F)	−9.9 (14.2)	−4.8 (23.4)	2.7 (36.9)	10.7 (51.3)	17.1 (62.8)	21.7 (71.1)	23.6 (74.5)	21.4 (70.5)	15.8 (60.4)	8.4 (47.1)	−0.1 (31.8)	−7.9 (17.8)	8.2 (46.8)
Mean daily minimum °C (°F)	−15.6 (3.9)	−11.0 (12.2)	−3.7 (25.3)	3.3 (37.9)	9.4 (48.9)	14.7 (58.5)	17.6 (63.7)	15.9 (60.6)	10.1 (50.2)	2.8 (37.0)	−5.2 (22.6)	−13.2 (8.2)	2.1 (35.8)
Record low °C (°F)	−29.5 (−21.1)	−25.1 (−13.2)	−20.7 (−5.3)	−8.9 (16.0)	−2.9 (26.8)	2.6 (36.7)	8.7 (47.7)	6.8 (44.2)	−2.2 (28.0)	−9.9 (14.2)	−21.6 (−6.9)	−28.5 (−19.3)	−29.5 (−21.1)
Average precipitation mm (inches)	3.5 (0.14)	5.0 (0.20)	9.0 (0.35)	21.8 (0.86)	39.0 (1.54)	49.8 (1.96)	105.9 (4.17)	99.0 (3.90)	54.4 (2.14)	27.9 (1.10)	11.1 (0.44)	3.1 (0.12)	429.5 (16.92)
Average precipitation days (≥ 0.1 mm)	2.6	3.1	3.3	5.1	7.1	10.8	12.1	11.7	9.5	6.4	3.6	2.6	77.9
Average snowy days	3.8	4.0	2.8	0.9	0.1	0	0	0	0	0.3	2.4	3.8	18.1
Average relative humidity (%)	55	50	41	37	40	47	59	65	63	59	57	55	52
Mean monthly sunshine hours	175.0	182.1	218.1	244.4	271.2	252.0	245.0	233.3	207.1	209.8	175.5	168.2	2,581.7
Percentage possible sunshine	58	60	58	61	61	56	54	56	56	61	59	58	58
Source: China Meteorological Administration
