= Chengqu, Yangquan =

Cheng 城区
- District
- Location in Shanxi
- Coordinates (Chengqu government): 37°50′51″N 113°36′02″E
- Country: People's Republic of China
- Province: Shanxi
- Prefecture-level city: Yangquan

Area
  - Total: 19.28 km^{2} (7.44 sq mi)

Population (2020)
  - Total: 225,443
  - Density: 11,690/km^{2} (30,280/sq mi)
- Time zone: UTC+8 (China Standard)
- Website: www.yqcq.gov.cn

Chengqu (simplified Chinese: 城区; traditional Chinese: 城區; pinyin: Chéngqū; lit. 'urban district'), or Cheng District is a district of the city of Yangquan, Shanxi province, China. As of 2020, it had a population of 225,000 living in an area of 19.28 km^{2} (7.44 sq mi).
