= Qingxu County =

County of Shanxi Province, China

Qingxu 清徐县 Tsingsu
- County
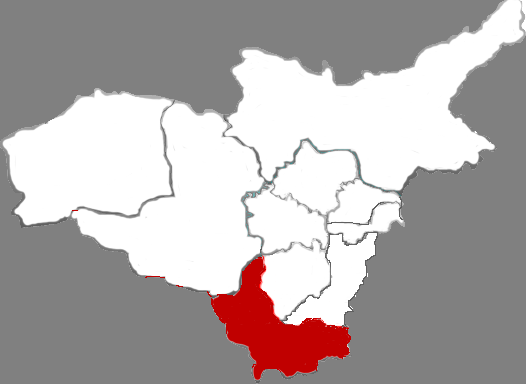
- Location in Taiyuan

- Location of the seat in Shanxi
- Coordinates: 37°36′26″N 112°21′31″E
- Country: People's Republic of China
- Province: Shanxi
- Prefecture-level city: Taiyuan

Population (2020)
  - Total: 344,472
- Time zone: UTC+8 (China Standard)
- Website: www.qx.gov.cn

Qingxu County (Chinese: 清徐县; pinyin: Qīngxú Xiàn) is a county of Shanxi Province, North China, it is under the administration of the prefecture-level city of Taiyuan, the capital of the province. The population was estimated to be 344,472 in 2020.

As of the summer of 2019, Donghu which is one of the city's largest lakes was drained. A section of Wenyuan road which is considered a large and important road in the city was bulldozed due to water pipe repairs.

Qingxu is called the vinegar capital of China, as well as being known for grape cultivation.

The largest Catholic community in China is in Qingxu.

== Climate ==
Climate data for Qingxu, elevation 760 m (2,490 ft), (1991–2020 normals, extremes 1981–present)
Month	Jan	Feb	Mar	Apr	May	Jun	Jul	Aug	Sep	Oct	Nov	Dec	Year
Record high °C (°F)	13.0 (55.4)	19.7 (67.5)	28.8 (83.8)	37.5 (99.5)	36.7 (98.1)	39.2 (102.6)	40.4 (104.7)	35.8 (96.4)	34.7 (94.5)	29.6 (85.3)	22.4 (72.3)	16.0 (60.8)	40.4 (104.7)
Mean daily maximum °C (°F)	2.4 (36.3)	6.8 (44.2)	13.5 (56.3)	20.9 (69.6)	26.6 (79.9)	29.8 (85.6)	30.5 (86.9)	28.8 (83.8)	24.4 (75.9)	18.3 (64.9)	10.3 (50.5)	3.6 (38.5)	18.0 (64.4)
Daily mean °C (°F)	−4.7 (23.5)	−0.4 (31.3)	6.3 (43.3)	13.6 (56.5)	19.5 (67.1)	23.1 (73.6)	24.6 (76.3)	22.9 (73.2)	17.8 (64.0)	11.2 (52.2)	3.4 (38.1)	−3.0 (26.6)	11.2 (52.1)
Mean daily minimum °C (°F)	−10.1 (13.8)	−6.2 (20.8)	0.0 (32.0)	6.7 (44.1)	12.3 (54.1)	16.6 (61.9)	19.4 (66.9)	18.0 (64.4)	12.3 (54.1)	5.3 (41.5)	−1.9 (28.6)	−8.1 (17.4)	5.4 (41.6)
Record low °C (°F)	−22.0 (−7.6)	−18.2 (−0.8)	−12.2 (10.0)	−4.4 (24.1)	1.7 (35.1)	7.5 (45.5)	12.6 (54.7)	9.9 (49.8)	0.7 (33.3)	−5.9 (21.4)	−17.1 (1.2)	−21.2 (−6.2)	−22.0 (−7.6)
Average precipitation mm (inches)	2.5 (0.10)	4.5 (0.18)	8.6 (0.34)	21.2 (0.83)	26.4 (1.04)	41.6 (1.64)	105.6 (4.16)	99.8 (3.93)	57.8 (2.28)	29.2 (1.15)	11.7 (0.46)	2.2 (0.09)	411.1 (16.2)
Average precipitation days (≥ 0.1 mm)	2.0	2.7	3.5	5.2	6.2	9.1	11.3	10.3	7.9	6.1	3.3	1.8	69.4
Average snowy days	2.7	3.1	2.0	0.6	0	0	0	0	0	0	1.9	2.3	12.6
Average relative humidity (%)	52	47	44	43	44	54	68	71	69	64	59	53	56
Mean monthly sunshine hours	154.3	171.7	213.9	236.1	257.4	227.5	212.8	206.2	185.1	185.3	156.5	153.1	2,359.9
Percentage possible sunshine	50	56	57	59	58	52	48	50	50	54	52	52	53
Source: China Meteorological Administration all-time January high
