= Daning County =

Daning County 大宁县 Taning
- County
- Location of the seat in Shanxi
- Coordinates: 36°27′N 110°42′E
- Country: People's Republic of China
- Province: Shanxi
- Prefecture-level city: Linfen

Area
  - Total: 962 km^{2} (371 sq mi)

Population (2010)
  - Total: 64,501
  - Density: 67.0/km^{2} (174/sq mi)
- Time zone: UTC+8 (China Standard)

Daning County (simplified Chinese: 大宁县; traditional Chinese: 大寧縣; pinyin: Dàníng Xiàn; lit. 'great peace') is a county in the southwest of Shanxi province, China, bordering Shaanxi province to the west. It is under the administration of Linfen.

The county spans an area of 962 square kilometres (371 mi^{2}), and has a population of 64,501, according to the 2010 Chinese Census. The county government is situated in the town of Xinshui.

== History ==
According to archaeological findings of Zhima Tan, there were inhabitants settled in present-day Daning County during Old Stone Age.

The approximate area of present-day Daning County was first incorporated under the Northern Wei.

Daning County itself was formally incorporated in 561 CE, during the Northern Zhou.

=== Republic of China ===
During the early years of the Republic of China, Daning County was placed under the jurisdiction of Hedong Circuit. Upon the abolition of the circuit system, Daning County was administered directly by the province.

=== People's Republic of China ===
Upon the establishment of the People's Republic of China in 1949, Daning County was placed under the jurisdiction of Linfen Prefecture, which was renamed to Jinnan Prefecture in 1954. The county was briefly abolished from 1958 to 1961. In 1970, Linfen Prefecture was restored, and Daning County was placed under its administration.

== Geography ==
The Yellow River flows through the western portion of the county, as does the Xinshui River, a tributary of the Yellow river.

The county's elevation ranges from about 500 metres (1,600 ft) to 1,600 metres (5,200 ft) in height.

== Climate ==
Climate data for Daning, elevation 766 m (2,513 ft), (1991–2020 normals, extremes 1981–present)
Month	Jan	Feb	Mar	Apr	May	Jun	Jul	Aug	Sep	Oct	Nov	Dec	Year
Record high °C (°F)	19.8 (67.6)	24.7 (76.5)	32.7 (90.9)	37.3 (99.1)	38.6 (101.5)	41.3 (106.3)	40.9 (105.6)	40.2 (104.4)	39.0 (102.2)	30.8 (87.4)	26.1 (79.0)	18.4 (65.1)	41.3 (106.3)
Mean daily maximum °C (°F)	2.6 (36.7)	7.9 (46.2)	15.0 (59.0)	22.2 (72.0)	27.3 (81.1)	31.3 (88.3)	32.2 (90.0)	30.1 (86.2)	25.1 (77.2)	18.8 (65.8)	11.4 (52.5)	4.1 (39.4)	19.0 (66.2)
Daily mean °C (°F)	−5.2 (22.6)	−0.4 (31.3)	6.6 (43.9)	13.7 (56.7)	18.9 (66.0)	23.2 (73.8)	24.9 (76.8)	23.0 (73.4)	17.8 (64.0)	10.9 (51.6)	3.5 (38.3)	−3.4 (25.9)	11.1 (52.0)
Mean daily minimum °C (°F)	−10.6 (12.9)	−6.2 (20.8)	0.0 (32.0)	6.4 (43.5)	11.4 (52.5)	16.1 (61.0)	19.2 (66.6)	17.9 (64.2)	12.8 (55.0)	5.6 (42.1)	−1.6 (29.1)	−8.5 (16.7)	5.2 (41.4)
Record low °C (°F)	−21.3 (−6.3)	−18.9 (−2.0)	−14.6 (5.7)	−6.4 (20.5)	0.6 (33.1)	7.2 (45.0)	12.1 (53.8)	10.1 (50.2)	1.2 (34.2)	−7.6 (18.3)	−17.1 (1.2)	−21.0 (−5.8)	−21.3 (−6.3)
Average precipitation mm (inches)	3.8 (0.15)	5.2 (0.20)	10.6 (0.42)	28.2 (1.11)	38.2 (1.50)	58.6 (2.31)	110.9 (4.37)	104.2 (4.10)	66.1 (2.60)	38.6 (1.52)	15.0 (0.59)	2.8 (0.11)	482.2 (18.98)
Average precipitation days (≥ 0.1 mm)	2.4	2.8	3.8	5.4	7.3	9.2	11.9	10.7	9.3	7.5	3.9	2.0	76.2
Average snowy days	3.5	3.0	1.5	0.2	0	0	0	0	0	0	2.0	2.4	12.6
Average relative humidity (%)	58	54	49	48	52	58	69	74	74	71	65	59	61
Mean monthly sunshine hours	171.7	164.1	196.1	219.3	237.7	225.1	215.7	199.7	170.1	177.6	170.4	175.9	2,323.4
Percentage possible sunshine	56	55	53	52	56	54	52	49	48	46	52	56	59
Source: China Meteorological Administration August Record High

== Administrative divisions ==
Daning County administers two towns and four townships.

=== Towns ===
The county's two towns are Xinshui and Qu'e.

=== Townships ===
The county's four townships are Sanduo Township, Taide Township, Xujiaduo Township, and Taigu Township.

== Demographics ==
As of the 2010 Chinese Census, the county had a population of 64,501 people, the majority of whom (34,666) lived in Xinshui. In the 2000 Chinese Census, the county's population totaled 56,037. A 1997 estimate placed the population at around 60,000 people.
