= Jiaoqu, Yangquan =

Jiaoqu 郊区
- District
- Location in Shanxi
- Coordinates: 37°56′29″N 113°35′07″E
- Country: People's Republic of China
- Province: Shanxi
- Prefecture-level city: Yangquan

Area
  - Total: 633 km^{2} (244 sq mi)

Population (2020)
  - Total: 275,094
  - Density: 435/km^{2} (1,130/sq mi)
- Time zone: UTC+8 (China Standard)
- Website: http://www.yqjq.gov.cn/

Jiaoqu (simplified Chinese: 郊区; traditional Chinese: 郊區; pinyin: Jiāoqū; lit. 'suburban district') is a district of Yangquan, Shanxi province, China. As of 2020, it had a population of 275,094 residing in an area of 633 km^{2} (244 sq mi).
