= Baode County =

Baode County 保德县 Paoteh
- County
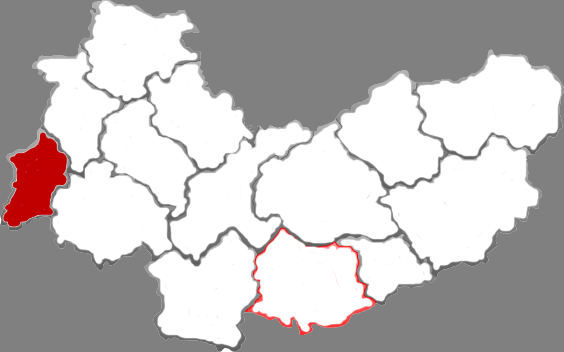
- Location in Xinzhou

- Location of the seat in Shanxi
- Coordinates: 39°01′24″N 111°05′15″E
- Country: People's Republic of China
- Province: Shanxi
- Prefecture-level city: Xinzhou

Area
  - County: 997.5 km^{2} (385.1 sq mi)

Population (2020)
  - County: 165,800
  - Density: 166.2/km^{2} (430.5/sq mi)
  - Rural: 136,200
- Time zone: UTC+8 (China Standard)
- Postal code: 034000
- Area code: 0350
- Website: www.baode.gov.cn

Baode (Chinese: 保德; pinyin: Bǎodé) is a county in the northwest of Shanxi province, China, bordering Shaanxi province to the west. It is under the administration of Xinzhou city, and is its westernmost county-level division.

Baode is known for Jujube oil.

== Administrative divisions ==
Baode administers 4 towns and 9 townships:

Towns

- Dongguan (东关镇)
- Yimen (义门镇)
- Qiaotou (桥头镇)
- Yangjiawan (杨家湾镇)

Townships

- Yaozhuang (腰庄乡)
- Hanjiachuan (韩家川乡)
- Linzheyu (林遮峪乡)
- Fengjiachuan (冯家川乡)
- Tuyata (土崖塔乡)
- Kongjiagou (孙家沟乡)
- Yaowa (窑洼乡)
- Yaogetai (尧圪台乡)
- Nanhegou (南河沟乡)

== Climate ==
Climate data for Baode, elevation 894 m (2,933 ft), (1991–2020 normals, extremes 1981–2010)
Month	Jan	Feb	Mar	Apr	May	Jun	Jul	Aug	Sep	Oct	Nov	Dec	Year
Record high °C (°F)	10.3 (50.5)	19.6 (67.3)	28.4 (83.1)	36.1 (97.0)	36.2 (97.2)	40.9 (105.6)	41.5 (106.7)	38.7 (101.7)	37.0 (98.6)	29.2 (84.6)	22.4 (72.3)	14.4 (57.9)	41.5 (106.7)
Mean daily maximum °C (°F)	−0.9 (30.4)	4.8 (40.6)	12.4 (54.3)	20.4 (68.7)	26.3 (79.3)	30.5 (86.9)	31.7 (89.1)	29.3 (84.7)	24.3 (75.7)	17.4 (63.3)	8.6 (47.5)	0.8 (33.4)	17.1 (62.8)
Daily mean °C (°F)	−7.7 (18.1)	−2.5 (27.5)	4.9 (40.8)	12.8 (55.0)	18.9 (66.0)	23.4 (74.1)	25.1 (77.2)	22.9 (73.2)	17.4 (63.3)	10.3 (50.5)	2.0 (35.6)	−5.5 (22.1)	10.2 (50.3)
Mean daily minimum °C (°F)	−12.7 (9.1)	−8.1 (17.4)	−1.2 (29.8)	6.0 (42.8)	12.1 (53.8)	17.1 (62.8)	19.6 (67.3)	17.8 (64.0)	12.2 (54.0)	5.0 (41.0)	−2.7 (27.1)	−10.1 (13.8)	4.6 (40.2)
Record low °C (°F)	−23.9 (−11.0)	−20.8 (−5.4)	−15.7 (3.7)	−5.4 (22.3)	1.3 (34.3)	5.8 (42.4)	12.7 (54.9)	9.1 (48.4)	1.7 (35.1)	−6.5 (20.3)	−17.5 (0.5)	−25.8 (−14.4)	−25.8 (−14.4)
Average precipitation mm (inches)	2.7 (0.11)	3.3 (0.13)	8.3 (0.33)	16.6 (0.65)	34.9 (1.37)	48.1 (1.89)	112.6 (4.43)	103.1 (4.06)	59.6 (2.35)	24.2 (0.95)	10.8 (0.43)	2.2 (0.09)	426.4 (16.79)
Average precipitation days (≥ 0.1 mm)	2.1	2.5	3.3	4.2	6.7	8.6	11.5	10.7	9.3	5.9	3.2	1.9	69.9
Average snowy days	2.9	3.3	1.6	0.4	0	0	0	0	0	0.3	1.7	2.4	12.6
Average relative humidity (%)	56	49	40	36	38	47	59	66	66	61	58	56	53
Mean monthly sunshine hours	153.3	175.5	213.3	236.9	264.3	249.9	241.0	222.2	200.8	202.2	162.9	147.4	2,469.7
Percentage possible sunshine	50	57	57	59	59	56	54	53	55	59	55	50	55
Source: China Meteorological Administration
