= Jingle County =

Jingle County 静乐县 Tsinglo
- County
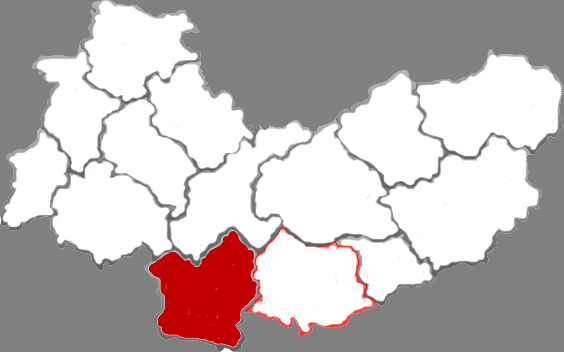
- Location in Xinzhou

- Location of the seat in Shanxi
- Coordinates: 38°23′45″N 112°05′09″E
- Country: People's Republic of China
- Province: Shanxi
- Prefecture-level city: Xinzhou

Population (2020)
  - Total: 119,277
- Time zone: UTC+8 (China Standard)

Jingle County (simplified Chinese: 静乐县; traditional Chinese: 靜樂縣; pinyin: Jìnglè Xiàn) is a county of central Shanxi province, China. It is under the administration of Xinzhou city.

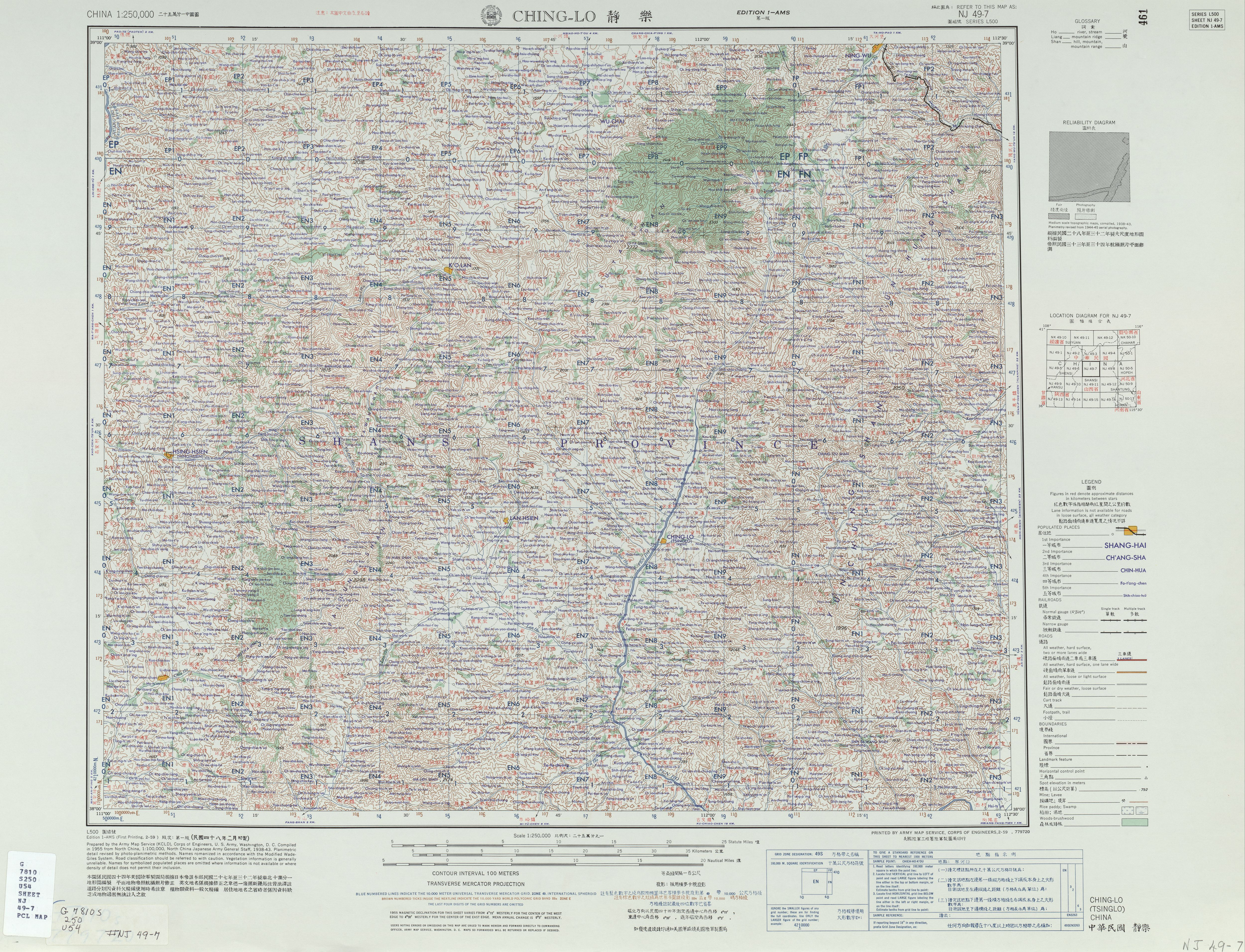
Map including Jingle (labeled as CHING-LO (TSINGLO) (walled) 靜樂) (AMS, 1955)

== Climate ==
Climate data for Jingle, elevation 1,212 m (3,976 ft), (1991–2020 normals, extremes 1981–2010)
Month	Jan	Feb	Mar	Apr	May	Jun	Jul	Aug	Sep	Oct	Nov	Dec	Year
Record high °C (°F)	12.9 (55.2)	20.3 (68.5)	26.8 (80.2)	33.6 (92.5)	34.0 (93.2)	38.6 (101.5)	37.7 (99.9)	36.7 (98.1)	34.6 (94.3)	26.8 (80.2)	23.0 (73.4)	16.1 (61.0)	38.6 (101.5)
Mean daily maximum °C (°F)	0.8 (33.4)	4.7 (40.5)	10.8 (51.4)	18.2 (64.8)	23.8 (74.8)	27.6 (81.7)	28.7 (83.7)	26.7 (80.1)	22.2 (72.0)	16.2 (61.2)	8.5 (47.3)	1.8 (35.2)	15.8 (60.5)
Daily mean °C (°F)	−8.3 (17.1)	−4.1 (24.6)	2.4 (36.3)	9.7 (49.5)	15.7 (60.3)	19.9 (67.8)	21.8 (71.2)	19.9 (67.8)	14.7 (58.5)	7.8 (46.0)	0.1 (32.2)	−6.6 (20.1)	7.8 (46.0)
Mean daily minimum °C (°F)	−14.9 (5.2)	−10.8 (12.6)	−4.5 (23.9)	2.0 (35.6)	7.7 (45.9)	12.7 (54.9)	16.1 (61.0)	14.6 (58.3)	8.9 (48.0)	1.8 (35.2)	−5.6 (21.9)	−12.5 (9.5)	1.3 (34.3)
Record low °C (°F)	−27.5 (−17.5)	−25.0 (−13.0)	−19.6 (−3.3)	−8.5 (16.7)	−3.3 (26.1)	1.9 (35.4)	7.6 (45.7)	5.5 (41.9)	−3.3 (26.1)	−10.0 (14.0)	−23.9 (−11.0)	−31.4 (−24.5)	−31.4 (−24.5)
Average precipitation mm (inches)	1.5 (0.06)	3.9 (0.15)	9.1 (0.36)	20.6 (0.81)	35.6 (1.40)	64.5 (2.54)	104.7 (4.12)	118.9 (4.68)	63.1 (2.48)	27.1 (1.07)	12.3 (0.48)	1.9 (0.07)	463.2 (18.22)
Average precipitation days (≥ 0.1 mm)	1.8	2.6	3.8	5.1	6.4	10.8	13.5	11.5	9.2	6.1	3.7	1.8	76.3
Average snowy days	2.3	3.8	3.4	1.2	0.1	0	0	0	0	0.3	2.9	2.3	16.3
Average relative humidity (%)	56	53	49	45	47	57	70	74	72	66	62	58	59
Mean monthly sunshine hours	182.4	180.8	216.9	232.7	253.9	226.2	205.3	197.8	192.9	202.8	182.3	179.2	2,453.2
Percentage possible sunshine	60	59	58	58	57	51	46	47	52	59	61	61	56
Source: China Meteorological Administration
