= Hequ County =

Hequ County 河曲县 Hokü
- County
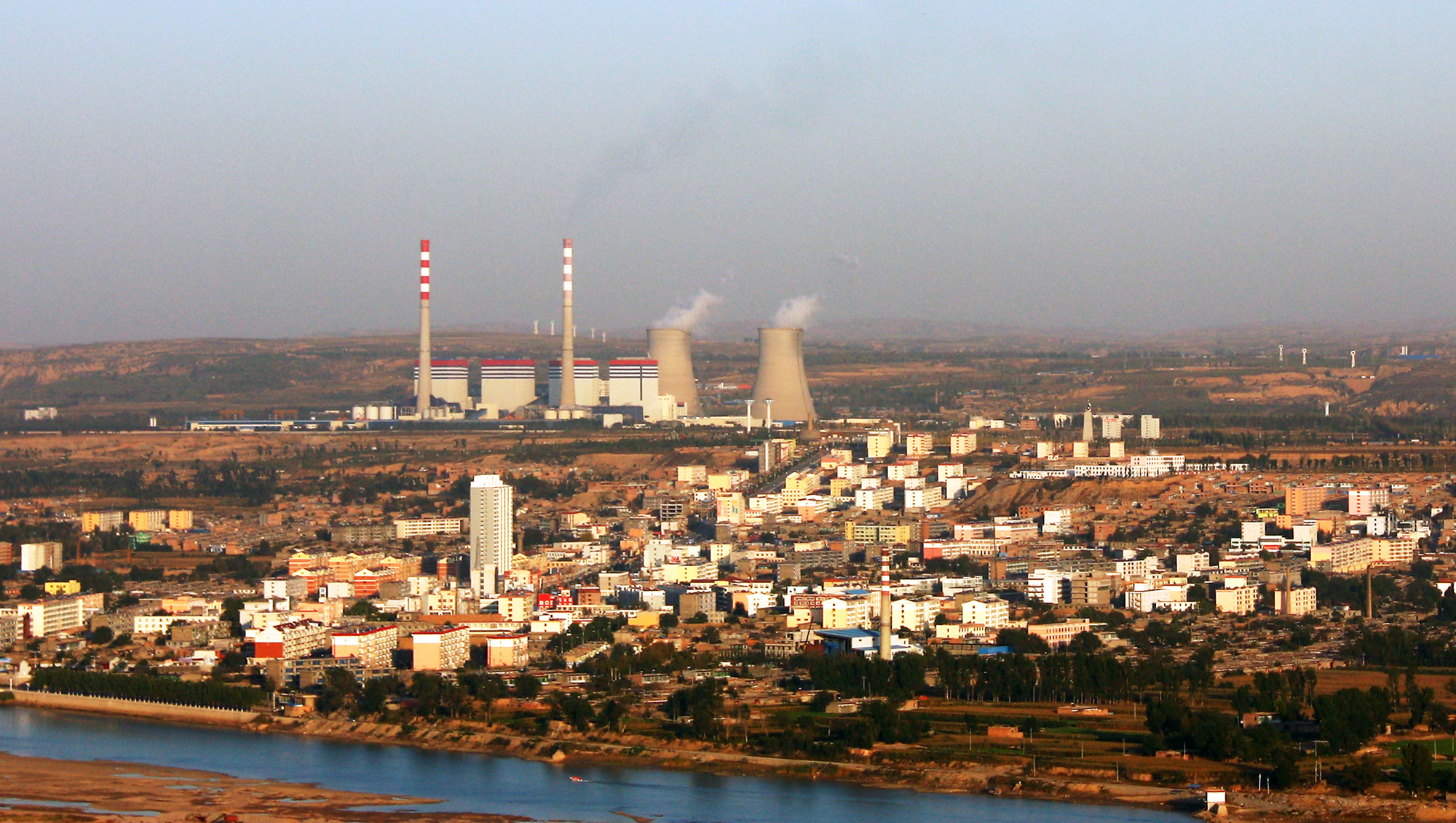

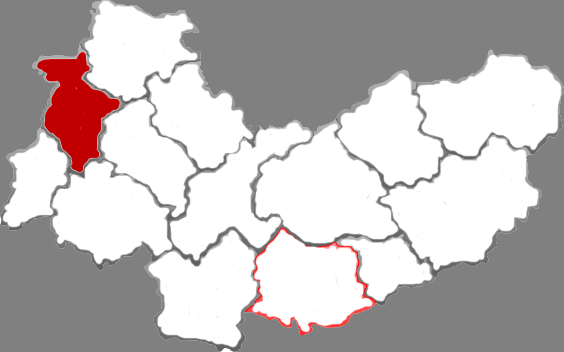
- Location in Xinzhou

- Location in Shanxi
- Coordinates: 39.2758°N 111.407°E
- Country: People's Republic of China
- Province: Shanxi
- Prefecture-level city: Xinzhou

Population (2020)
  - Total: 123,505
- Time zone: UTC+8 (China Standard)

Hequ (Chinese: 河曲; pinyin: Héqǔ) is a county in the northwest of Shanxi province, China, bordering Shaanxi province to the west and Inner Mongolia to the northwest. It is under the administration of Xinzhou city.

== Climate ==
Climate data for Hequ, elevation 862 m (2,828 ft), (1991–2020 normals, extremes 1981–2010)
Month	Jan	Feb	Mar	Apr	May	Jun	Jul	Aug	Sep	Oct	Nov	Dec	Year
Record high °C (°F)	9.9 (49.8)	20.1 (68.2)	28.0 (82.4)	37.0 (98.6)	36.8 (98.2)	42.2 (108.0)	40.9 (105.6)	37.0 (98.6)	36.4 (97.5)	29.7 (85.5)	22.0 (71.6)	14.6 (58.3)	42.2 (108.0)
Mean daily maximum °C (°F)	−1.5 (29.3)	4.5 (40.1)	11.9 (53.4)	20.2 (68.4)	26.2 (79.2)	30.3 (86.5)	31.3 (88.3)	29.0 (84.2)	24.3 (75.7)	17.5 (63.5)	8.4 (47.1)	0.4 (32.7)	16.9 (62.4)
Daily mean °C (°F)	−10.7 (12.7)	−4.6 (23.7)	3.2 (37.8)	11.6 (52.9)	18.1 (64.6)	22.7 (72.9)	24.0 (75.2)	21.6 (70.9)	16.0 (60.8)	8.6 (47.5)	0.0 (32.0)	−7.9 (17.8)	8.5 (47.4)
Mean daily minimum °C (°F)	−17.4 (0.7)	−11.5 (11.3)	−4.2 (24.4)	3.1 (37.6)	9.6 (49.3)	14.7 (58.5)	17.3 (63.1)	15.4 (59.7)	9.2 (48.6)	1.7 (35.1)	−6.1 (21.0)	−14.0 (6.8)	1.5 (34.7)
Record low °C (°F)	−32.8 (−27.0)	−25.6 (−14.1)	−21.6 (−6.9)	−8.7 (16.3)	−3.4 (25.9)	3.2 (37.8)	8.1 (46.6)	5.5 (41.9)	−3.6 (25.5)	−10.5 (13.1)	−21.9 (−7.4)	−29.4 (−20.9)	−32.8 (−27.0)
Average precipitation mm (inches)	2.8 (0.11)	3.0 (0.12)	8.5 (0.33)	16.0 (0.63)	35.5 (1.40)	48.2 (1.90)	100.9 (3.97)	90.4 (3.56)	49.7 (1.96)	22.3 (0.88)	8.2 (0.32)	1.9 (0.07)	387.4 (15.25)
Average precipitation days (≥ 0.1 mm)	2.1	2.1	3.3	4.5	7.1	9.7	11.3	11.0	9.3	5.8	3.0	1.8	71
Average snowy days	3.5	3.4	2.3	0.5	0	0	0	0	0	0.3	2.0	3.0	15
Average relative humidity (%)	61	54	46	41	43	51	66	73	72	66	62	60	58
Mean monthly sunshine hours	145.5	163.5	207.9	232.7	260.8	249.4	240.7	229.0	206.4	205.6	168.6	142.8	2,452.9
Percentage possible sunshine	48	53	56	58	59	56	54	55	56	60	57	49	55
Source: China Meteorological Administration
