= Wanbailin, Taiyuan =

Coordinates: 37°52′23″N 112°31′00″E

Wanbailin 万柏林区
- District
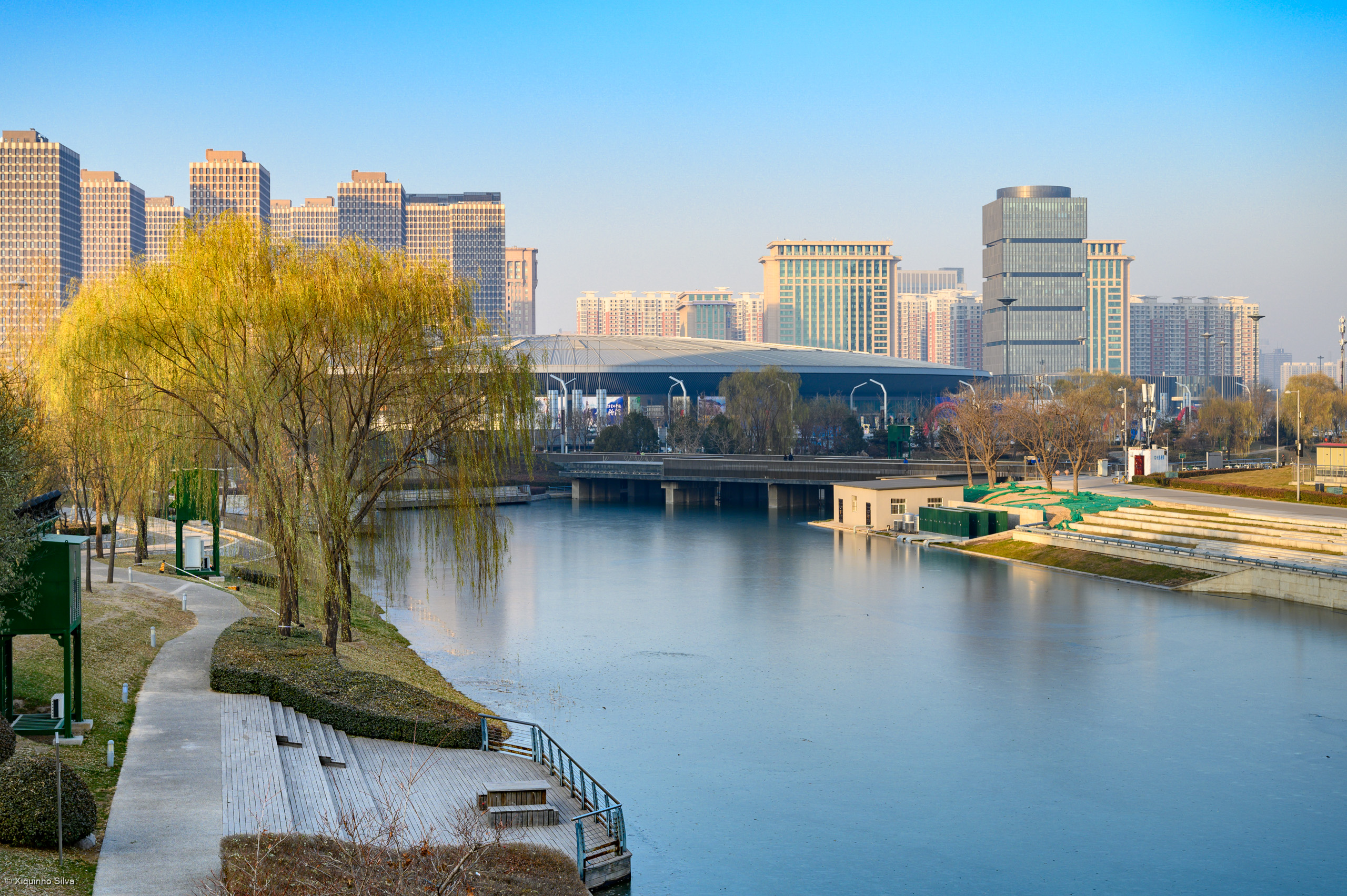

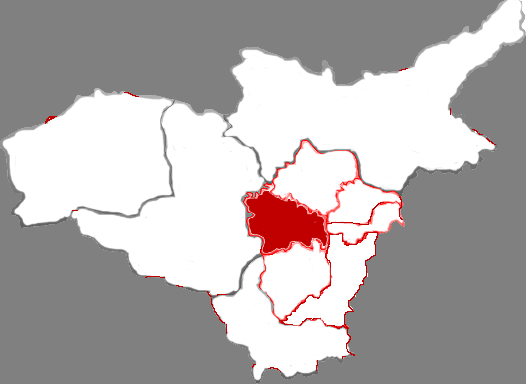
- Location in Taiyuan

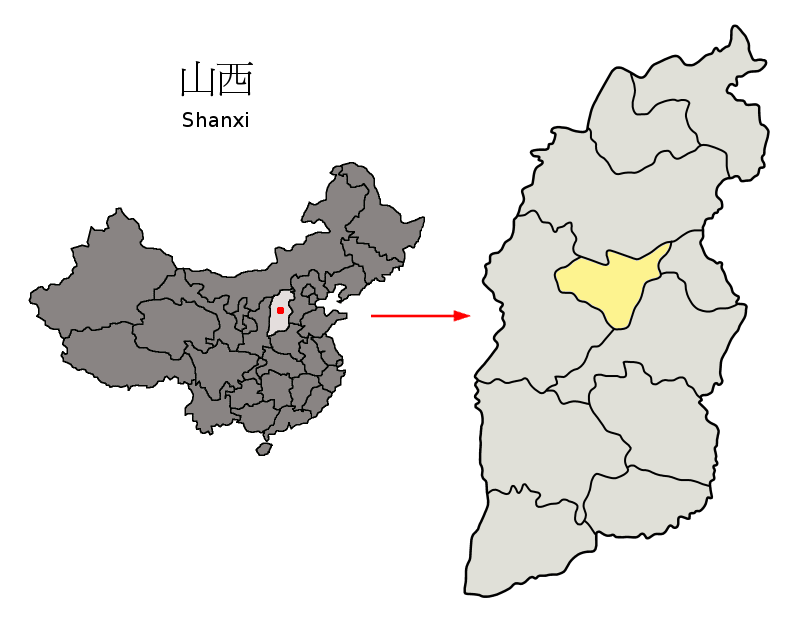
- Taiyuan in Shanxi
- Country: People's Republic of China
- Province: Shanxi
- Prefecture-level city: Taiyuan

Population (2020)
  - Total: 951,238
- Time zone: UTC+8 (China Standard)
- Website: www.sxtywbl.gov.cn

Wanbailin District (simplified Chinese: 万柏林区; traditional Chinese: 萬柏林區; pinyin: Wànbǎilín Qū) is one of six districts of the prefecture-level city of Taiyuan, the capital of Shanxi Province, North China.
