= Jiaocheng County =

Jiaocheng County 交城县 Kiaocheng
- County
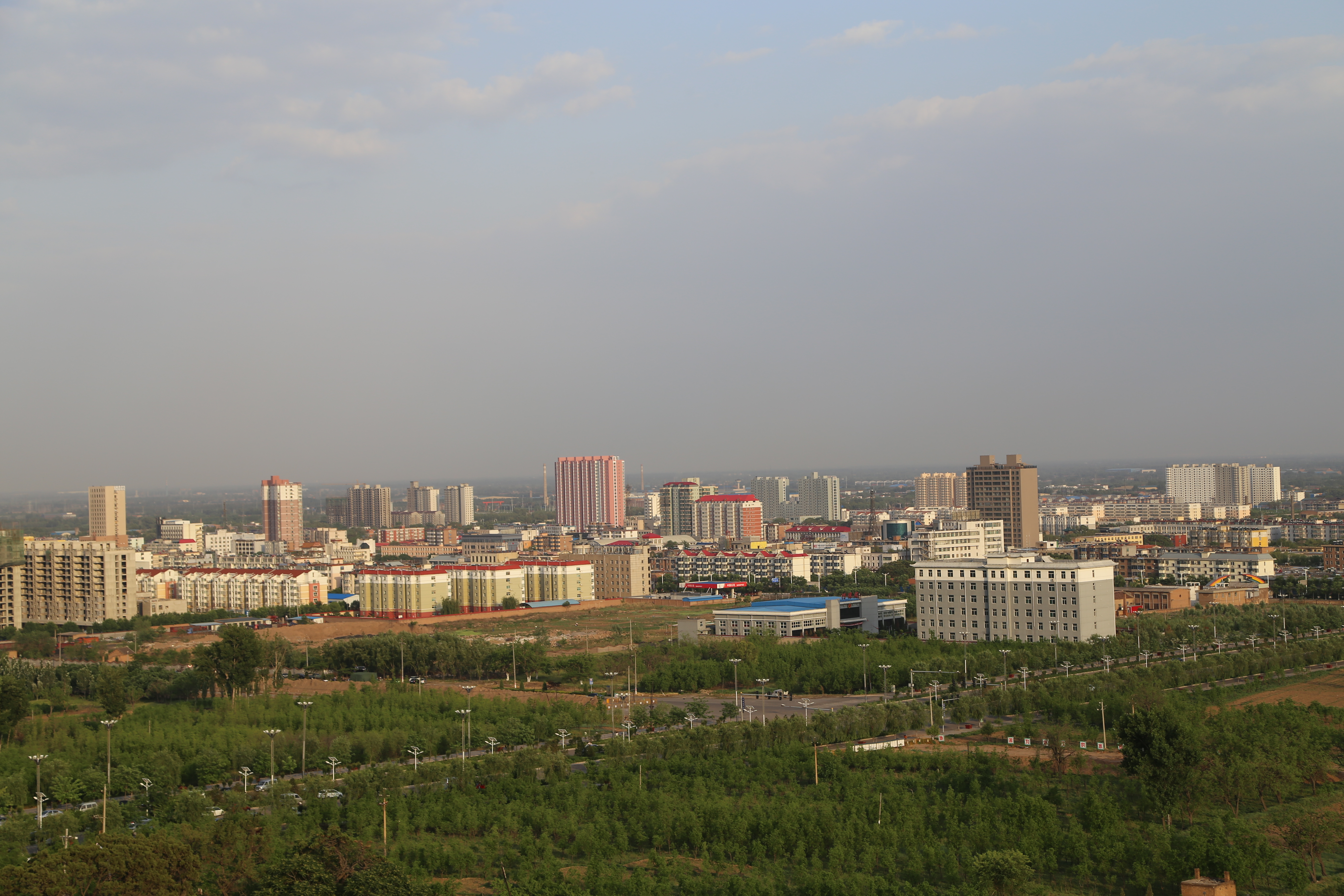

- Location of the seat in Shanxi
- Coordinates: 37.66°N 111.84°E
- Country: People's Republic of China
- Province: Shanxi
- Prefecture-level city: Lüliang

Population (2020)
  - Total: 226,768
- Time zone: UTC+8 (China Standard)

Jiaocheng (Chinese: 交城; pinyin: Jiāochéng) is a county of central Shanxi province, China. It is under the administration of Lüliang city.

== Climate ==
Climate data for Jiaocheng, elevation 754 m (2,474 ft), (1991–2020 normals, extremes 1981–present)
Month	Jan	Feb	Mar	Apr	May	Jun	Jul	Aug	Sep	Oct	Nov	Dec	Year
Record high °C (°F)	13.8 (56.8)	21.1 (70.0)	27.7 (81.9)	37.8 (100.0)	36.5 (97.7)	39.5 (103.1)	37.6 (99.7)	36.7 (98.1)	36.4 (97.5)	29.4 (84.9)	23.5 (74.3)	16.6 (61.9)	39.5 (103.1)
Mean daily maximum °C (°F)	2.4 (36.3)	7.0 (44.6)	13.7 (56.7)	21.0 (69.8)	26.7 (80.1)	29.9 (85.8)	30.4 (86.7)	28.5 (83.3)	24.4 (75.9)	18.5 (65.3)	10.5 (50.9)	3.7 (38.7)	18.1 (64.5)
Daily mean °C (°F)	−4.9 (23.2)	−0.5 (31.1)	6.2 (43.2)	13.5 (56.3)	19.3 (66.7)	23.0 (73.4)	24.5 (76.1)	22.6 (72.7)	17.4 (63.3)	10.9 (51.6)	3.2 (37.8)	−3.3 (26.1)	11.0 (51.8)
Mean daily minimum °C (°F)	−10.8 (12.6)	−6.7 (19.9)	−0.6 (30.9)	6.0 (42.8)	11.4 (52.5)	15.8 (60.4)	18.9 (66.0)	17.4 (63.3)	11.4 (52.5)	4.5 (40.1)	−2.5 (27.5)	−8.7 (16.3)	4.7 (40.4)
Record low °C (°F)	−23.5 (−10.3)	−23.5 (−10.3)	−14.8 (5.4)	−5.2 (22.6)	−0.1 (31.8)	6.6 (43.9)	11.5 (52.7)	8.4 (47.1)	−1.4 (29.5)	−6.4 (20.5)	−21.0 (−5.8)	−23.7 (−10.7)	−23.7 (−10.7)
Average precipitation mm (inches)	2.6 (0.10)	4.0 (0.16)	8.5 (0.33)	21.3 (0.84)	27.6 (1.09)	41.8 (1.65)	104.6 (4.12)	97.7 (3.85)	65.1 (2.56)	29.9 (1.18)	11.6 (0.46)	2.1 (0.08)	416.8 (16.42)
Average precipitation days (≥ 0.1 mm)	2.0	2.6	3.2	4.9	6.0	9.4	11.9	10.8	8.2	5.8	3.2	1.5	69.5
Average snowy days	2.8	3.2	2.0	0.4	0	0	0	0	0	0.1	1.7	2.3	12.5
Average relative humidity (%)	58	53	47	45	47	56	69	74	73	67	63	60	59
Mean monthly sunshine hours	146.9	165.3	204.9	235.3	257.9	230.7	216.3	209.5	186.9	186.0	160.9	146.7	2,347.3
Percentage possible sunshine	48	54	55	59	59	52	49	50	51	54	53	50	53
Source: China Meteorological Administration all-time August record high

== Notable people ==
- Hua Guofeng
- Wu Rongrong
