= Jiaokou County =

Jiaokou County 交口县
- County
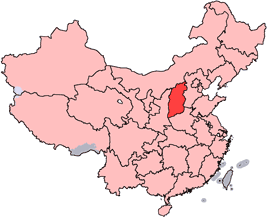

- Location of the seat in Shanxi
- Coordinates: 36°55′N 111°20′E
- Country: People's Republic of China
- Province: Shanxi
- Prefecture-level city: Lüliang
- County seat: Chengguan

Area
  - Total: 1,262 km^{2} (487 sq mi)

Population (2020)
  - Total: 95,313
  - Density: 75.53/km^{2} (195.6/sq mi)
- Time zone: UTC+8 (China Standard)
- Postal code: 032400
- Area code: 0358
- Website: www.sxjk.gov.cn

Jiaokou County (simplified Chinese: 交口县; traditional Chinese: 交口縣; pinyin: Jiāokǒu Xiàn) is a county in Lüliang City, Shanxi province, China.

== Administrative divisions ==
Jiaokou county includes the towns:

1. Shuitou (水头镇)
2. Shuangchi (双池镇)
3. Taohongpo (桃红坡镇)
4. Kancheng (康城镇)

and the townships:

1. Shikou (石口乡)
2. Huilong (回龙乡)
3. Wenquan (温泉乡)

== History ==
Jiaokou county was developed in 1971. The local government is in Shuitou.

== Climate ==
Climate data for Jiaokou, elevation 1,407 m (4,616 ft), (1991–2020 normals, extremes 1981–present)
Month	Jan	Feb	Mar	Apr	May	Jun	Jul	Aug	Sep	Oct	Nov	Dec	Year
Record high °C (°F)	15.2 (59.4)	19.8 (67.6)	24.2 (75.6)	31.4 (88.5)	32.5 (90.5)	35.4 (95.7)	34.1 (93.4)	32.5 (90.5)	32.6 (90.7)	25.7 (78.3)	22.4 (72.3)	16.5 (61.7)	35.4 (95.7)
Mean daily maximum °C (°F)	0.0 (32.0)	3.1 (37.6)	9.0 (48.2)	16.2 (61.2)	21.2 (70.2)	25.2 (77.4)	26.3 (79.3)	24.4 (75.9)	19.9 (67.8)	14.3 (57.7)	7.5 (45.5)	1.2 (34.2)	14.0 (57.3)
Daily mean °C (°F)	−6.4 (20.5)	−3.3 (26.1)	2.4 (36.3)	9.2 (48.6)	14.4 (57.9)	18.4 (65.1)	20.2 (68.4)	18.5 (65.3)	13.5 (56.3)	7.6 (45.7)	1.1 (34.0)	−4.9 (23.2)	7.6 (45.6)
Mean daily minimum °C (°F)	−10.8 (12.6)	−8.0 (17.6)	−2.9 (26.8)	2.8 (37.0)	7.5 (45.5)	11.8 (53.2)	15.0 (59.0)	13.8 (56.8)	8.8 (47.8)	2.9 (37.2)	−3.3 (26.1)	−9.1 (15.6)	2.4 (36.3)
Record low °C (°F)	−24.1 (−11.4)	−22.2 (−8.0)	−18.5 (−1.3)	−10.3 (13.5)	−2.6 (27.3)	3.0 (37.4)	7.4 (45.3)	5.4 (41.7)	−1.5 (29.3)	−10.2 (13.6)	−17.9 (−0.2)	−23.3 (−9.9)	−24.1 (−11.4)
Average precipitation mm (inches)	6.3 (0.25)	9.7 (0.38)	15.2 (0.60)	33.7 (1.33)	41.4 (1.63)	62.7 (2.47)	137.6 (5.42)	131.4 (5.17)	85.0 (3.35)	42.8 (1.69)	18.5 (0.73)	4.7 (0.19)	589 (23.21)
Average precipitation days (≥ 0.1 mm)	3.3	4.3	5.4	6.5	8.1	10.0	14.3	12.8	10.0	7.8	4.8	3.1	90.4
Average snowy days	4.1	5.3	4.4	1.1	0.1	0	0	0	0	0.5	3.6	3.6	22.7
Average relative humidity (%)	52	53	50	48	52	62	74	78	76	65	57	52	60
Mean monthly sunshine hours	199.9	187.8	219.2	236.0	256.0	238.7	208.2	194.6	181.4	197.2	193.4	203.3	2,515.7
Percentage possible sunshine	65	61	59	60	58	54	47	47	49	57	64	68	57
Source: China Meteorological Administration

== Other information ==
Sea buckthorn is a famous wild plant which grows locally. Its juice has a special flavor, so some local factories produce and sell it; one of these companies is Weishijie.
