= North China administrative division codes of the PRC (Division 1) =

List of administrative division codes of the PRC in Division 1 or North China.

== Beijing (11) ==
110000	Beijing municipality 北京市								
110100	District 市辖区	110101	Dongcheng 东城区	110102	Xicheng 西城区	110103	~~Chongwen~~ 崇文区	110104	~~Xuanwu~~ 宣武区
110100	District 市辖区	110105	Chaoyang 朝阳区	110106	Fengtai 丰台区	110107	Shijingshan 石景山区	110108	Haidian 海淀区
110100	District 市辖区	110109	Mentougou 门头沟区	110110	~~Yanshan~~ 燕山区	110111	Fangshan 房山区	110112	Tongzhou 通州区
110100	District 市辖区	110113	Shunyi 顺义区	110114	Changping 昌平区	110115	Daxing 大兴区	110116	Huairou 怀柔区
110100	District 市辖区	110117	Pinggu 平谷区	110118	Miyun 密云区	110119	Yanqing 延庆区		
110200	~~County~~ 县	110221	~~Changping Co.~~ 昌平县	110222	~~Shunyi Co.~~ 顺义县	110223	~~Tong Co.~~ 通县	110224	~~Daxing Co.~~ 大兴县
110200	~~County~~ 县	110225	~~Fangshan Co.~~ 房山县	110226	~~Pinggu Co.~~ 平谷县	110227	~~Huairou Co.~~ 怀柔县	110228	~~Miyun Co.~~ 密云县
110200	~~County~~ 县	110229	~~Yanqing Co.~~ 延庆县						

== Tianjin (12) ==
120000	Tianjin municipality 天津市								
120100	District 市辖区	120101	Heping 和平区	120102	Hedong 河东区	120103	Hexi 河西区	120104	Nankai 南开区
120100	District 市辖区	120105	Hebei 河北区	120106	Hongqiao 红桥区	120107	~~Tanggu~~ 塘沽区	120108	~~Hangu~~ 汉沽区
120100	District 市辖区	120109	~~Dagang~~ 大港区	120110	Dongli 东丽区	120111	Xiqing 西青区	120112	Jinnan 津南区
120100	District 市辖区	120113	Beichen 北辰区	120114	Wuqing 武清区	120115	Baodi 宝坻区	120116	Binhai 滨海新区
120100	District 市辖区	120117	Ninghe 宁河区	120118	Jinghai 静海区	120119	Jizhou 蓟州区		
120200	~~County~~ 县	120221	~~Ninghe Co.~~ 宁河县	120222	~~Wuqing Co.~~ 武清县	120223	~~Jinghai Co.~~ 静海县	120224	~~Baodi Co.~~ 宝坻县
120200	~~County~~ 县	120225	~~Ji Co.~~ 蓟县						

== Hebei (13) ==
130000	Hebei Province 河北省								
130100	Shijiazhuang city 石家庄市								
130101	District 市辖区	130102	Chang'an 长安区	130103	~~Qiaodong~~ 桥东区	130104	Qiaoxi 桥西区	130105	Xinhua 新华区
130101	District 市辖区	130106	~~Jiao~~ 郊区	130107	Jingxing 井陉矿区	130108	Yuhua 裕华区	130109	Gaocheng 藁城区
130101	District 市辖区	130110	Luquan 鹿泉区	130111	Luancheng 栾城区				
130121	Jingxing Co. 井陉县	130122	~~Huolu Co.~~ 获鹿县	130123	Zhengding Co. 正定县	130124	~~Luancheng Co.~~ 栾城县	130125	Xingtang Co. 行唐县
130126	Lingshou Co. 灵寿县	130127	Gaoyi Co. 高邑县	130128	Shenze Co. 深泽县	130129	Zanhuang Co. 赞皇县	130130	Wuji Co. 无极县
130131	Pingshan Co. 平山县	130132	Yuanshi Co. 元氏县	130133	Zhao Co. 赵县				
130181	Xinji city 辛集市	130182	~~Gaocheng city~~ 藁城市	130183	Jinzhou city 晋州市	130184	Xinle city 新乐市	130185	~~Luancheng city~~ 鹿泉市
130200	Tangshan city 唐山市								
130201	District 市辖区	130202	Lunan 路南区	130203	Lubei 路北区	130204	Guye 古冶区	130205	Kaiping 开平区
130201	District 市辖区	130206	~~Xin~~ 新区	130207	Fengnan 丰南区	130208	Fengrun 丰润区	130209	Caofeidian 曹妃甸区
130221	~~Fengrun Co.~~ 丰润县	130222	~~Fengnan Co.~~ 丰南县	130223	Luan Co. 滦县	130224	Luannan Co. 滦南县	130225	Laoting Co. 乐亭县
130226	~~Qian'an Co.~~ 迁安县	130227	Qianxi Co. 迁西县	130228	~~Zunhua Co.~~ 遵化县	130229	Yutian Co. 玉田县	130230	~~Tanghai Co.~~ 唐海县
130281	Zunhua city 遵化市	130282	~~Fengnan city~~ 丰南市	130283	Qian'an city 迁安市				
130300	Qinhuangdao city 秦皇岛市								
130301	District 市辖区	130302	Haigang 海港区	130303	Shanhaiguan 山海关区	130304	Beidaihe 北戴河区	130305	~~Jiao~~ 郊区
130301	District 市辖区	130306	Funing 抚宁区						
130321	Qinglong Co. 青龙县	130322	Changli Co. 昌黎县	130323	~~Funing Co.~~ 抚宁县	130324	Lulong Co. 卢龙县		
130400	Handan city 邯郸市								
130401	District 市辖区	130402	Hanshan 邯山区	130403	Congtai 丛台区	130404	Fuxing 复兴区	130405	~~Jiao~~ 郊区
130401	District 市辖区	130406	Fengfeng 峰峰矿区	130407	Feixiang 肥乡区	130408	Yongnian 永年区		
130421	~~Handan Co.~~ 邯郸县	130422	~~Wu'an Co.~~ 武安县	130423	Linzhang Co. 临漳县	130424	Cheng'an Co. 成安县	130425	Daming Co. 大名县
130426	She Co. 涉县	130427	Ci Co. 磁县	130428	~~Feixiang Co.~~ 肥乡县	130429	~~Yongnian Co.~~ 永年县	130430	Qiu Co. 邱县
130431	Jize Co. 鸡泽县	130432	Guangping Co. 广平县	130433	Guantao Co. 馆陶县	130434	Wei Co. 魏县	130435	Quzhou Co. 曲周县
130481	Wu'an city 武安市								
130500	Xingtai city 邢台市								
130501	District 市辖区	130502	Qiaodong 桥东区	130503	Qiaoxi 桥西区	130504	~~Jiao~~ 郊区		
130521	Xingtai Co. 邢台县	130522	Lincheng Co. 临城县	130523	Neiqiu Co. 内丘县	130524	Baixiang Co. 柏乡县	130525	Longyao Co. 隆尧县
130526	Ren Co. 任县	130527	Nanhe Co. 南和县	130528	Ningjin Co. 宁晋县	130529	Julu Co. 巨鹿县	130530	Xinhe Co. 新河县
130531	Guangzong Co. 广宗县	130532	Pingxiang Co. 平乡县	130533	Wei Co. 威县	130534	Qinghe Co. 清河县	130535	Linxi Co. 临西县
130581	Nangong city 南宫市	130582	Shahe city 沙河市						
130600	Baoding city 保定市								
130601	District 市辖区	130602	Jingxiu 竞秀区	130603	~~Beishi~~ 北市区	130604	~~Nanshi~~ 南市区	130605	~~Jiao~~ 郊区
130601	District 市辖区	130606	Lianchi 莲池区	130607	Mancheng 满城区	130608	Qingyuan 清苑区	130609	Xushui 徐水区
130621	~~Mancheng Co.~~ 满城县	130622	~~Qingyuan Co.~~ 清苑县	130623	Laishui Co. 涞水县	130624	Fuping Co. 阜平县	130625	~~Xushui Co.~~ 徐水县
130626	Dingxing Co. 定兴县	130627	Tang Co. 唐县	130628	Gaoyang Co. 高阳县	130629	Rongcheng Co. 容城县	130630	Laiyuan Co. 涞源县
130631	Wangdu Co. 望都县	130632	Anxin Co. 安新县	130633	Yi Co. 易县	130634	Quyang Co. 曲阳县	130635	Li Co. 蠡县
130636	Shunping Co. 顺平县	130637	Boye Co. 博野县	130638	Xiong Co. 雄县				
130681	Zhuozhou city 涿州市	130682	Dingzhou city 定州市	130683	Anguo city 安国市	130684	Gaobeidian city 高碑店市		
130700	Zhangjiakou city 张家口市								
130701	District 市辖区	130702	Qiaodong 桥东区	130703	Qiaoxi 桥西区	130704	~~Chafang~~ 茶坊区	130705	Xuanhua 宣化区
130701	District 市辖区	130706	Xiahuayuan 下花园区	130707	~~Pangjiabao~~ 庞家堡区	130708	Wanquan 万全区	130709	Chongli 崇礼区
130721	~~Xuanhua Co.~~ 宣化县	130722	Zhangbei Co. 张北县	130723	Kangbao Co. 康保县	130724	Guyuan Co. 沽源县	130725	Shangyi Co. 尚义县
130726	Yu Co. 蔚县	130727	Yangyuan Co. 阳原县	130728	Huai'an Co. 怀安县	130729	~~Wanquan Co.~~ 万全县	130730	Huailai Co. 怀来县
130731	Zhuolu Co. 涿鹿县	130732	Chicheng Co. 赤城县	130733	~~Chongli Co.~~ 崇礼县				
130800	Chengde city 承德市								
130801	District 市辖区	130802	Shuangqiao 双桥区	130803	Shuangluan 双滦区	130804	Yingshouyingzi 鹰手营子矿区		
130821	Chengde Co. 承德县	130822	Xinglong Co. 兴隆县	130823	~~Pingquan Co.~~ 平泉县	130824	Luanping Co. 滦平县	130825	Longhua Co. 隆化县
130826	Fengning Co. 丰宁县	130827	Kuancheng Co. 宽城县	130828	Weichang Co. 围场县				
130881	Pingquan city 平泉市								
130900	Cangzhou city 沧州市								
130901	District 市辖区	130902	Xinhua 新华区	130903	Yunhe 运河区	130904	~~Jiao~~ 郊区		
130921	Cang Co. 沧县	130922	Qing Co. 青县	130923	Dongguang Co. 东光县	130924	Haixing Co. 海兴县	130925	Yanshan Co. 盐山县
130926	Suning Co. 肃宁县	130927	Nanpi Co. 南皮县	130928	Wuqiao Co. 吴桥县	130929	Xian Co. 献县	130930	Mengcun Co. 孟村县
130981	Botou city 泊头市	130982	Renqiu city 任丘市	130983	Huanghua city 黄骅市	130984	Hejian city 河间市		
131000	Langfang city 廊坊市								
131001	District 市辖区	131002	Anci 安次区	131003	Guangyang 广阳区				
131021	~~Sanhe Co.~~ 三河县	131022	Gu'an Co. 固安县	131023	Yongqing Co. 永清县	131024	Xianghe Co. 香河县	131025	Dacheng Co. 大城县
131026	Wen'an Co. 文安县	131027	~~Ba Co.~~ 霸县	131028	Dachang Co. 大厂县				
131081	Bazhou city 霸州市	131082	Sanhe city 三河市						
131100	Hengshui city 衡水市								
131101	District 市辖区	131102	Taocheng 桃城区	131103	Jizhou 冀州区				
131121	Zaoqiang Co. 枣强县	131122	Wuyi Co. 武邑县	131123	Wuqiang Co. 武强县	131124	Raoyang Co. 饶阳县	131125	Anping Co. 安平县
131126	Gucheng Co. 故城县	131127	Jing Co. 景县	131128	Fucheng Co. 阜城县				
131181	~~Jizhou city~~ 冀州市	131182	Shenzhou city 深州市						
132100	~~Handan Prefecture~~ 邯郸地区								
132200	~~Xingtai Prefecture~~ 邢台地区								
132300	~~Shijiazhuang Prefecture~~ 石家庄地区								
132400	~~Baoding Prefecture~~ 保定地区								
132500	~~Zhangjiakou Prefecture~~ 张家口地区								
132600	~~Chengde Prefecture~~ 承德地区								
132700	~~Tangshan Prefecture~~ 唐山地区								
132800	~~Langfang Prefecture~~ 廊坊地区								
132900	~~Cangzhou Prefecture~~ 沧州地区								
133000	~~Hengshui Prefecture~~ 衡水地区								
139000	~~Direct administration~~ 省直辖								
139001	~~Wu'an city~~ 武安市	139002	~~Bazhou city~~ 霸州市	139003	~~Zunhua city~~ 遵化市	139004	~~Xinji city~~ 辛集市	139005	~~Gaocheng city~~ 藁城市
139006	~~Jinzhou city~~ 晋州市	139007	~~Xinle city~~ 新乐市	139008	~~Botou city~~ 泊头市	139009	~~Renqiu city~~ 任丘市	139010	~~Huanghua city~~ 黄骅市
139011	~~Hejian city~~ 河间市	139012	~~Sanhe city~~ 三河市	139013	~~Nangong city~~ 南宫市	139014	~~Shahe city~~ 沙河市	139015	~~Dingzhou city~~ 定州市
139016	~~Zhuozhou city~~ 涿州市	139017	~~Anguo city~~ 安国市	139018	~~Gaobeidian city~~ 高碑店市	139019	~~Luquan city~~ 鹿泉市	139020	~~Fengnan city~~ 丰南市

== Shanxi (14) ==
140000	Shanxi Province 山西省								
140100	Taiyuan city 太原市								
140101	District 市辖区	140102	~~Nancheng~~ 南城区	140103	~~Beicheng~~ 北城区	140104	~~Hexi~~ 河西区	140105	Xiaodian 小店区
140101	District 市辖区	140106	Yingze 迎泽区	140107	Xinghualing 杏花岭区	140108	Jiancaoping 尖草坪区	140109	Wanbailin 万柏林区
140101	District 市辖区	140110	Jinyuan 晋源区	140111	~~Gujiao~~ 古交工矿区	140112	~~Nanjiao~~ 南郊区	140113	~~Beijiao~~ 北郊区
140101	District 市辖区					140120	~~Shi~~ 市区		
140121	Qingxu Co. 清徐县	140122	Yangqu Co. 阳曲县	140123	Loufan Co. 娄烦县				
140181	Gujiao city 古交市								
140200	Datong city 大同市								
140201	District 市辖区	140202	Pingcheng 平城区	140203	~~Kuang~~ 矿区				
140201	District 市辖区			140211	Yungang 云冈区	140212	Xinrong 新荣区	140213	Yunzhou 云州区
140221	Yanggao Co. 阳高县	140222	Tianzhen Co. 天镇县	140223	Guangling Co. 广灵县	140224	Lingqiu Co. 灵丘县	140225	Hunyuan Co. 浑源县
140226	Zuoyun Co. 左云县	140227	~~Datong Co.~~ 大同县						
140300	Yangquan city 阳泉市								
140301	District 市辖区	140302	Cheng 城区	140303	Kuang 矿区				
140301	District 市辖区			140311	Jiao 郊区				
140321	Pingding Co. 平定县	140322	Yu Co. 盂县						
140400	Changzhi city 长治市								
140401	District 市辖区	140402	~~Cheng~~ 城区						
140401	District 市辖区			140411	Luzhou 潞州区	140412	Lucheng 潞城区	140413	Shangdang 上党区
140401	District 市辖区	140414	Tunliu 屯留区						
140421	~~Changzhi Co.~~ 长治县	140422	~~Lucheng Co.~~ 潞城县	140423	Xiangyuan Co. 襄垣县	140424	~~Tunliu Co.~~ 屯留县	140425	Pingshun Co. 平顺县
140426	Licheng Co. 黎城县	140427	Huguan Co. 壶关县	140428	Zhangzi Co. 长子县	140429	Wuxiang Co. 武乡县	140430	Qin Co. 沁县
140431	Qinyuan Co. 沁源县								
140481	~~Lucheng city~~ 潞城市								
140500	Jincheng city 晋城市								
140501	District 市辖区	140502	Cheng 城区						
140501	District 市辖区			140511	~~Jiao~~ 郊区				
140521	Qinshui Co. 沁水县	140522	Yangcheng Co. 阳城县	140523	~~Gaoping Co.~~ 高平县	140524	Lingchuan Co. 陵川县	140525	Zezhou Co. 泽州县
140581	Gaoping city 高平市								
140600	Shuozhou city 朔州市								
140601	District 市辖区	140602	Shuocheng 朔城区	140603	Pinglu 平鲁区				
140621	Shanyin Co. 山阴县	140622	Ying Co. 应县	140623	Youyu Co. 右玉县	140624	~~Huairen Co.~~ 怀仁县		
140681	Huairen city 怀仁市								
140700	Jinzhong city 晋中市								
140701	District 市辖区	140702	Yuci 榆次区						
140721	Yushe Co. 榆社县	140722	Zuoquan Co. 左权县	140723	Heshun Co. 和顺县	140724	Xiyang Co. 昔阳县	140725	Shouyang Co. 寿阳县
140726	Taigu Co. 太谷县	140727	Qi Co. 祁县	140728	Pingyao Co. 平遥县	140729	Lingshi Co. 灵石县		
140781	Jiexiu city 介休市								
140800	Yuncheng city 运城市								
140801	District 市辖区	140802	Yanhu 盐湖区						
140821	Linyi Co. 临猗县	140822	Wanrong Co. 万荣县	140823	Wenxi Co. 闻喜县	140824	Jishan Co. 稷山县	140825	Xinjiang Co. 新绛县
140826	Jiang Co. 绛县	140827	Yuanqu Co. 垣曲县	140828	Xia Co. 夏县	140829	Pinglu Co. 平陆县	140830	Ruicheng Co. 芮城县
140881	Yongji city 永济市	140882	Hejin city 河津市						
140900	Xinzhou city 忻州市								
140901	District 市辖区	140902	Xinfu 忻府区						
140921	Dingxiang Co. 定襄县	140922	Wutai Co. 五台县	140923	Dai Co. 代县	140924	Fanshi Co. 繁峙县	140925	Ningwu Co. 宁武县
140926	Jingle Co. 静乐县	140927	Shenchi Co. 神池县	140928	Wuzhai Co. 五寨县	140929	Kelan Co. 岢岚县	140930	Hequ Co. 河曲县
140931	Baode Co. 保德县	140932	Pianguan Co. 偏关县						
140981	Yuanping city 原平市								
141000	Linfen city 临汾市								
141001	District 市辖区	141002	Yaodu 尧都区						
141021	Quwo Co. 曲沃县	141022	Yicheng Co. 翼城县	141023	Xiangfen Co. 襄汾县	141024	Hongtong Co. 洪洞县	141025	Gu Co. 古县
141026	Anze Co. 安泽县	141027	Fushan Co. 浮山县	141028	Ji Co. 吉县	141029	Xiangning Co. 乡宁县	141030	Daning Co. 大宁县
141031	Xi Co. 隰县	141032	Yonghe Co. 永和县	141033	Pu Co. 蒲县	141034	Fenxi Co. 汾西县		
141081	Houma city 侯马市	141082	Huozhou city 霍州市						
141100	Lüliang city 吕梁市								
141101	District 市辖区	141102	Lishi 离石区						
141121	Wenshui Co. 文水县	141122	Jiaocheng Co. 交城县	141123	Xing Co. 兴县	141124	Lin Co. 临县	141125	Liulin Co. 柳林县
141126	Shilou Co. 石楼县	141127	Lan Co. 岚县	141128	Fangshan Co. 方山县	141129	Zhongyang Co. 中阳县	141130	Jiaokou Co. 交口县
141181	Xiaoyi city 孝义市	141182	Fenyang city 汾阳市						
142100	~~Yanbei Prefecture~~ 雁北地区								
142200	~~Xinzhou Prefecture~~ 忻州地区								
142300	~~Lüliang Prefecture~~ 吕梁地区								
142400	~~Jinzhong Prefecture~~ 晋中地区								
142500	~~Jindongnan Prefecture~~ 晋东南地区								
142600	~~Linfen Prefecture~~ 临汾地区								
142700	~~Yuncheng Precture~~ 运城地区								
149000	~~Direct administration~~ 省直辖								
149001	~~Gujiao city~~ 古交市	149002	~~Gaoping city~~ 高平市	149003	~~Lucheng city~~ 潞城市				

== Inner Mongolia (15) ==
150000	Inner Mongolia AR 内蒙古自治区								
150100	Hohhot city 呼和浩特市								
150101	District 市辖区	150102	Xincheng 新城区	150103	Huimin 回民区	150104	Yuquan 玉泉区	150105	Saihan 赛罕区
150101	District 市辖区					150120	~~Shi~~ 市区		
150121	Tumedzuo Ban. 土默特左旗	150122	Togtoh Co. 托克托县	150123	Horinger Co. 和林格尔县	150124	Qingshuihe Co. 清水河县	150125	Wuchuan Co. 武川县
150200	Baotou city 包头市								
150201	District 市辖区	150202	Donghe 东河区	150203	Hondlon 昆都仑区	150204	Qingshan 青山区	150205	Shiguai 石拐区
150201	District 市辖区	150206	Bayanobo 白云鄂博矿区	150207	Jiuyuan 九原区				
150201	District 市辖区					150220	~~Shi~~ 市区		
150221	Tumedyou Ban. 土默特右旗	150222	Guyang Co. 固阳县	150223	Darhanmumingganlianhe Ban. 达尔罕茂明安联合旗				
150300	Wuhai city 乌海市								
150301	District 市辖区	150302	Haibowan 海勃湾区	150303	Hainan 海南区	150304	Wuda 乌达区		
150400	Chifeng city 赤峰市								
150401	District 市辖区	150402	Hongshan 红山区	150403	Yuanbaoshan 元宝山区	150404	Songshan 松山区		
150421	Arhorqin Ban. 阿鲁科尔沁旗	150422	Bairizuo Ban. 巴林左旗	150423	Bairinyou Ban. 巴林右旗	150424	Linxi Co. 林西县	150425	Hexigten Ban. 克什克腾旗
150426	Ongniud Ban. 翁牛特旗	150427	~~Chifeng Co.~~ 赤峰县	150428	Harqin Ban. 喀喇沁旗	150429	Ningcheng Co. 宁城县	150430	Aohan Ban. 敖汉旗
150500	Tongliao city 通辽市								
150501	District 市辖区	150502	Horqin 科尔沁区						
150521	Horqinzuoyizhong Ban. 科尔沁左翼中旗	150522	Horqizuoyihou Ban. 科尔沁左翼后旗	150523	Kailu Co. 开鲁县	150524	Hure Ban. 库伦旗	150525	Naiman Ban. 奈曼旗
150526	Jarud Ban. 扎鲁特旗								
150581	Holingol city 霍林郭勒市								
150600	Ordos city 鄂尔多斯市								
150601	District 市辖区	150602	Dongsheng 东胜区	150603	Hiabagx 康巴什区				
150621	Dalad Ban. 达拉特旗	150622	Jungar Ban. 准格尔旗	150623	Otogqian Ban. 鄂托克前旗	150624	Otog Ban. 鄂托克旗	150625	Hanggin Ban. 杭锦旗
150626	Uxin Ban. 乌审旗	150627	Ejinhoro Ban. 伊金霍洛旗						
150700	Hulunbuir city 呼伦贝尔市								
150701	District 市辖区	150702	Hailar 海拉尔区	150703	Jalainur 扎赉诺尔区				
150721	Arun Ban. 阿荣旗	150722	Morindawa Ban. 莫力达瓦旗	150723	Oroqin Ban. 鄂伦春旗	150724	Evenk Ban. 鄂温克旗	150725	Chenbarag Ban. 陈巴尔虎旗
150726	Xinbaragzuo Ban. 新巴尔虎左旗	150727	Xinbaragyou Ban. 新巴尔虎右旗						
150781	Manzhouli city 满洲里市	150782	Yakeshi city 牙克石市	150783	Zhalantun city 扎兰屯市	150784	Ergun city 额尔古纳市	150785	Genhe city 根河市
150800	Bayannur city 巴彦淖尔市								
150801	District 市辖区	150802	Linhe 临河区						
150821	Wuyuan Co. 五原县	150822	Dengkou Co. 磴口县	150823	Uratqian Ban. 乌拉特前旗	150824	Uratzhong Ban. 乌拉特中旗	150825	Urathou Ban. 乌拉特后旗
150826	Hangginhou Ban. 杭锦后旗								
150900	Ulanqab city 乌兰察布市								
150901	District 市辖区	150902	Jining 集宁区						
150921	Zhuozi Co. 卓资县	150922	Huade Co. 化德县	150923	Shangdu Co. 商都县	150924	Xinghe Co. 兴和县	150925	Liangcheng Co. 凉城县
150926	Chaharyouyiqian Ban. 察哈尔右翼前旗	150927	Chaharyouyizhong Ban. 察哈尔右翼中旗	150928	Chaharyouyihou Ban. 察哈尔右翼后旗	150929	Siziwang Ban. 四子王旗		
150981	Fengzhen city 丰镇市								
152100	~~Hulunbuir League~~ 呼伦贝尔盟								
152200	Hinggan League 兴安盟								
152201	Ulanhot city 乌兰浩特市	152202	Arxan city 阿尔山市						
152221	Horqinyouyiqian Ban. 科尔沁右翼前旗	152222	Horqinyouyizhong Ban. 科尔沁右翼中旗	152223	Jalaid Ban. 扎赉特旗	152224	Tuquan Co. 突泉县		
152300	~~Jirem League~~ 哲里木盟								
152400	~~Juud League~~ 昭乌达盟								
152500	Xilingol League 锡林郭勒盟								
152501	Erenhot city 二连浩特市	152502	Xilinhot city 锡林浩特市						
152521	~~Abagnar Ban.~~ 阿巴哈纳尔旗	152522	Abag Ban. 阿巴嘎旗	152523	Sonidzuo Ban. 苏尼特左旗	152524	Sonidyou Ban. 苏尼特右旗	152525	Dongujimqin Ban. 东乌珠穆沁旗
152526	Xiujimqin Ban. 西乌珠穆沁旗	152527	Taibus Ban. 太仆寺旗	152528	Xianghuang Ban. 镶黄旗	152529	Zhengxiangbai Ban. 正镶白旗	152530	Zhenglan Ban. 正蓝旗
152531	Duolun Co. 多伦县								
152600	~~Ulanqab League~~ 乌兰察布盟								
152700	~~Ihju League~~ 伊克昭盟								
152800	~~Bayannur League~~ 巴彦淖尔盟								
152900	Alxa League 阿拉善盟								
152921	Alxazuo Ban. 阿拉善左旗	152922	Alxayou Ban. 阿拉善右旗	152923	Ejin Ban. 额济纳旗				
