= Changzhi (disambiguation) =

Changzhi (长治市) is a prefecture-level city in Shanxi, China.

Changzhi may also refer to:

- Changzhi County (长治县), in Changzhi, Shanxi, China
- Changzhi, Pingtung (長治鄉), township in Pingtung County, Taiwan
