= China National Highway 309 =

Road in China

National Highway 309
- 309国道

Route information
- Length: 2,208 km (1,372 mi)

Major junctions
- From: Rongcheng, Shandong
- To: Lanzhou, Gansu

Location
- Country: China

Highway system
- National Trunk Highway System; Primary; Auxiliary
← G308	→ G310

China National Highway 309 (G309) runs west from Rongcheng, Shandong towards Hebei Province, Shanxi Province, Shaanxi Province, Ningxia Autonomous Region, and ends in Lanzhou, Gansu. It is 2208 kilometres in length.

== Route and distance ==
Route and distance

City	Distance (km)
Rongcheng, Shandong	0
Wendeng, Shandong	41
Laiyang, Shandong	184
Laixi, Shandong	208
Pingdu, Shandong	264
Weifang, Shandong	344
Changle, Shandong	368
Qingzhou, Shandong	402
Zibo, Shandong	447
Zichuan District, Shandong	466
Jinan, Shandong	559
Chiping, Shandong	636
Liaocheng, Shandong	680
Guan County, Shandong	733
Guantao, Hebei	747
Feixiang, Hebei	786
Handan, Hebei	816
Wu'an, Hebei	852
She County, Hebei	919
Licheng County, Shanxi	947
Lucheng, Shanxi	978
Tunliu, Shanxi	1015
Anze, Shanxi	1092
Linfen, Shanxi	1176
Ji County, Shanxi	1297
Yichuan County, Shaanxi	1389
Guyuan, Ningxia	1887
Xiji, Ningxia	1942
Lanzhou, Gansu	2208

== See also ==
- China National Highways
