= Guxian (disambiguation) =

Guxian (古县) primarily refers to Gu County, Shanxi, People's Republic of China (PRC).

It may also refer to numerous smaller locations in the PRC:

- Guxian Dam (故县水库), dam on the Luo River in Luoning County, Henan

== Township-level divisions ==
- Guxian (古县镇), town in Yongfeng County, Ji'an Jiangxi
- Guxian (古县镇), town in Qi County, Jinzhong, Shanxi
- Guxian Township, Hejian (故仙乡), Hebei
- Guxian Township, Xingtai (固献乡), in Wei County, Xingtai, Hebei
- Guxian, Tongbai County (固县镇), town in Henan
- Guxian, Yanshi (顾县镇), town in Henan
- Guxian Township, Henan (古贤乡), in Tangyin County
- Guxian Township, Pu County (古县乡), Shanxi
- Guxian Township, Qinshui County (固县乡), Shanxi

Written as "故县":

- Guxian Subdistrict, Jiaoqu, Changzhi, Shanxi
- Guxian, Lingbao, town in Henan
- Guxian, Luoning County, town in Henan
- Guxian, Qin County, town in Shanxi
- Guxian Township, Wuxiang County, Shanxi
