= Xiadian =

Xiadian may refer to the following locations in China:

- Xiadian, Huoqiu County (夏店镇), town in Huoqiu County, Anhui
- Xiadian, Dachang County (夏垫镇), town in Dachang Hui Autonomous County, Hebei
- Xiadian, Zhaoyuan, Shandong (夏甸镇), town in Zhaoyuan, Shandong
- Xiadian, Xiangyuan County (夏店镇), town in Xiangyuan County, Shanxi
- Xiadian Township (夏店乡), Ruzhou, Henan
