= Cilin =

Cilin (慈林) may refer to:

- Cilin, Zhangzi County, town in Zhangzi County, Shanxi, China
- Cilin, Fenghua, village in Fenghua District, Ningbo, Zhejiang, China
