= Luzhou District =

Luzhou District may refer to:

- Luzhou District, Changzhi (Chinese: 潞州区; pinyin: Lùzhōu Qū), in Shanxi, PR China
- Luzhou District, New Taipei (Chinese: 蘆洲區; pinyin: Lúzhōu Qū), in Taiwan
