= Jindeng Temple =

Buddhist temple in Shanxi, China

- 金灯寺
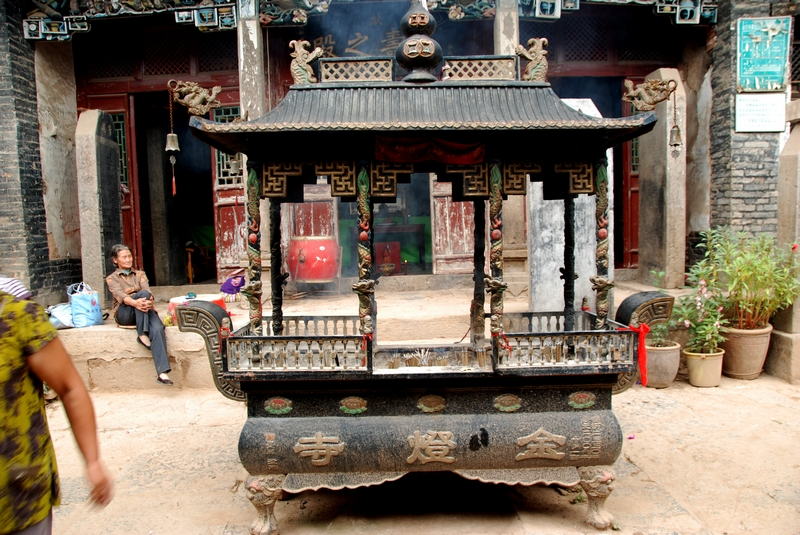
- A censer at the temple.

- Location within Shanxi

Religion
- Affiliation: Buddhism
- Deity: Chan Buddhism

Location
- Location: Xingcheng Town, Changzhi, Shanxi
- Country: China
- Interactive map of Jindeng Temple
- Coordinates: 36°01′46″N 113°41′18″E

Architecture
- Style: Chinese architecture
- Founder: Chan master Yu (芋禅师)
- Established: Northern Qi (550–577)

Jindeng Temple (simplified Chinese: 金灯寺; traditional Chinese: 金燈寺; pinyin: Jīndēng Sì; lit. 'Golden Light Temple') is a Buddhist temple located in Xingcheng Town of Changzhi, Shanxi, China. It was built in the steep precipices and cliffs in Beiquan Village, 65-kilometre (40 mi) to the northeast of Pingshun County. The temple is renowned for its grottoes, rock and statues of Buddha.

== History ==
The original temple dates back to the 6th century, in the Northern Qi (550–577). At that time, it initially called "Baoyan Temple" (宝岩寺).

In the temple there are 14 Buddhist niches, 37 Buddhist shrines, and over 500 statues of Buddha carved from 1504 to 1565.

In June 2006, it was listed among the sixth group of "Major National Historical and Cultural Sites in Shanxi" by the State Council of China.

== Architecture ==
The entire complex are all built on cliffs which are over 1,700-metre (5,600 ft) from the ground. The existing main buildings include the Hall of Water and Land (水陆殿), Hall of Grand Buddha (大佛殿), Hall of Lord Guan (关帝殿), Pavilion of Juxian (聚仙楼), and Pavilion of Ksitigarbha.

== Gallery ==
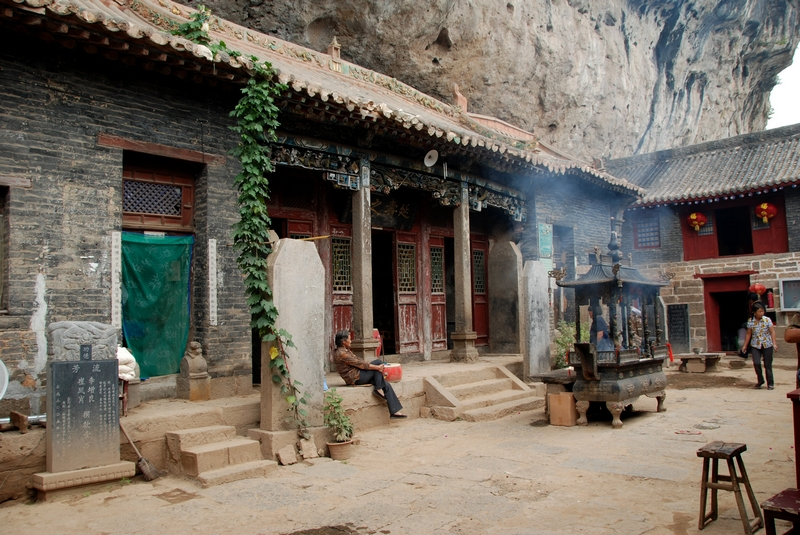
Halls at Jindeng Temple.

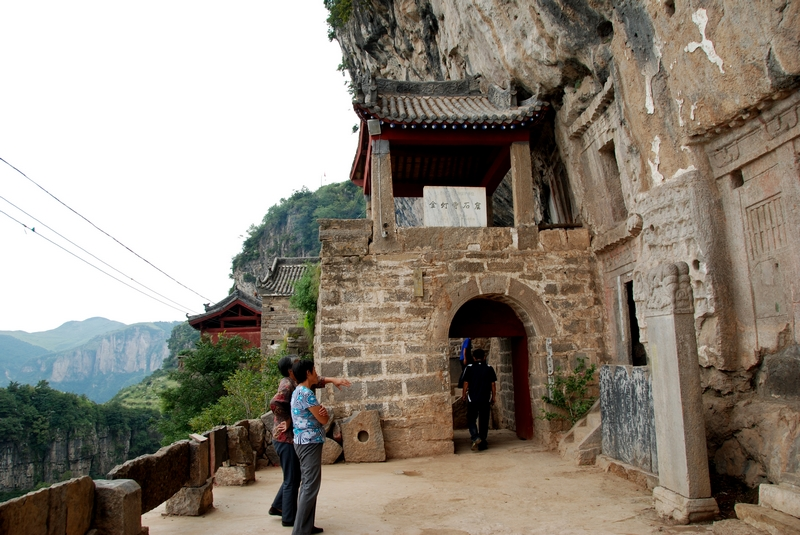
Grottoes.

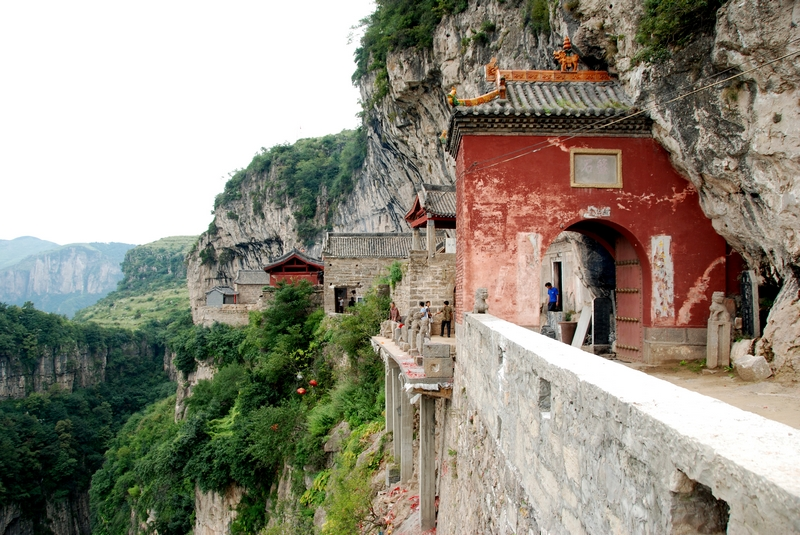
Grottoes.

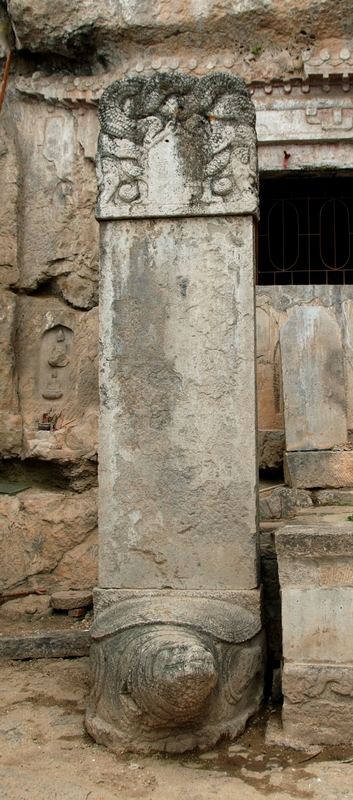
Bixi

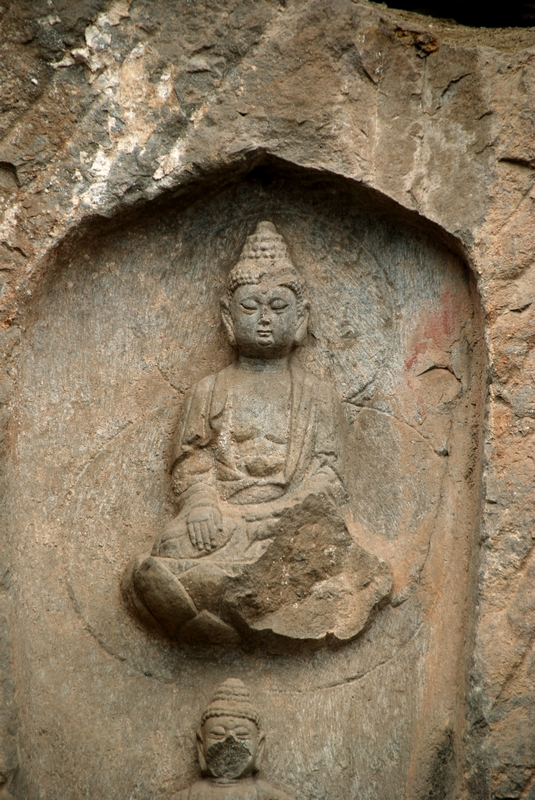
Statue of Buddha.

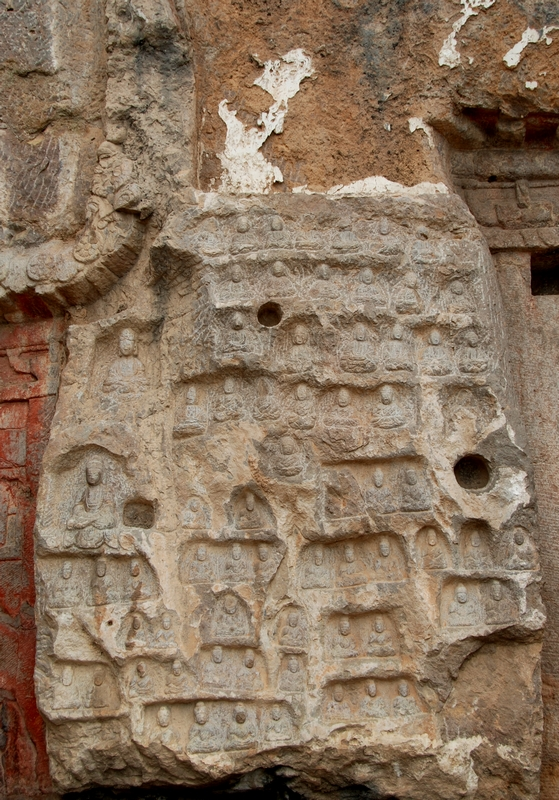
Statues of Buddha.
