= Diliutun Township =

Diliutun Township 第六屯乡
- Rural Township
- Dìliùtún Xiāng
- Location in Hebei Location in China
- Coordinates: 40°39′42″N 114°33′53″E
- Country: People's Republic of China
- Province: Hebei
- Prefecture-level city: Zhangjiakou
- County: Huai'an

Area
  - Total: 88.32 km^{2} (34.10 sq mi)

Population (2010)
  - Total: 9,053
  - Density: 102.5/km^{2} (265/sq mi)
- Time zone: UTC+8 (China Standard)

Diliutun Township (Chinese: 第六屯乡; pinyin: Dìliùtún Xiāng) is a rural township located in Huai'an County, Zhangjiakou, Hebei, China. According to the 2010 census, Diliutun Township had a population of 9,053, including 4,751 males and 4,302 females. The population was distributed as follows: 1,605 people aged under 14, 6,320 people aged between 15 and 64, and 1,128 people aged over 65.

== See also ==
- List of township-level divisions of Hebei
