= Tianji Coal Chemical Industry Group chemical spill =

Industrial disaster in Shanxi, China

The Tianji Coal Chemical Industry Group chemical spill was a severe chemical spill that occurred in Shanxi Province, China during 2012–13. More than 39 tons of anilines (toxic chemicals widely used as precursors in the manufacture of pigment, herbicides and other chemicals) leaked from a loose drainage valve at a plant owned by Tianji Coal Chemical Industry Group in the Shanxi city of Changzhi. This chemical spill contaminated the Zhuozhang River which is the source of drinking water for more than one million people, and caused a water crisis in the downstream City of Handan, Hebei Province.

== Tianji Coal Chemical Industry Group ==
Tianji Coal Chemical Industry Group is one of the five largest state-owned coal companies in Shanxi. They use a water-intensive gasification process to convert coal to chemicals that are critical for a wide range of products. According to a Greenpeace report, the factory owned by Tianji Industry Group in Changzhi dumps more than six million tons of wastewater per year. In 2010 and 2011, Tianji was judged by Shanxi’s environmental protection bureau to be polluting above normal levels in four quarters and was fined each time.

== Aniline leak ==
An aniline leak occurred on December 31, 2012 due to a poor-quality metal hose. About 39 tons of aniline, a potential carcinogen, went into the drainage from the fertilizer factory. Thirty tons were contained by a reservoir, but nearly nine tons leaked into the Zhuozhang River. A large amount of dead fish was seen in the upper reaches of the Zhuozhang River. Leaked aniline traveled along the Zhang River and reached reservoirs in neighboring cities.

== Water crisis ==
The contaminated Zhuozhang River feeds into the Zhang River, which is a source of drinking water for Shanxi, Hebei and Henan provinces. Therefore, the spill affected at least 28 villages and a handful of cities of more than one million people, including Handan. After receiving confirmation of this chemical spill, officials in Handan shut down part of its municipal water supply system, which sent residents into a scramble for bottled water. In the countryside, officials also told farmers not to graze their livestock near the river. Fire engines were mobilized to bring water to the city's residents and 66,000 bottles of clean water were bought in from other cities. Underground reservoirs were also opened to support the city’s water use.

== River cleanup ==
Nearly 5000 workers were called in for an immediate clean-up of the river. Because of the low temperature, a large part of contaminants was stopped by ice in the river. 670 tons of contaminated ice and more than 750 tons of wastewater have been cleared away. Activated carbon was also used to absorb the chemicals remaining in the unfrozen water below. After several days of cleanup, concentrations of aniline in the river decreased to 2.15 mg/L from the previous level of 72 mg/L, according to data from Wangjiazhuang monitoring station on Zhuozhang river near the eastern border of Shanxi province. However, based on national standards, the concentration should be less than 0.1 mg/L. Since the pollutants are not expected to decompose easily, it took weeks to solve the problems caused by this spill.

== Delayed report ==
After the aniline leak occurred, officials in Changzhi delayed reporting the spill for five days. The reason for delay is not clear, but it may be due to the large underestimations of the amount of leaked anilines in the first few days after spills. According to the regulation passed by the State Council in 2007, an institution responsible for an accident should report within an hour to the production safety department of a county-level government or higher. The report should reach a higher level of government within two hours. The mayor of Changzhi has apologized for the delay in reporting the spill affecting supplies of drinking water.

== Punishment ==
After investigation into this spill, 24 managers in the company who were responsible for supervision were given administrative disciplinary sanctions. The mayor of Changzhi was removed from his position. Two heads of the plant's storage workshop were fired.

== Challenges ==
The conflict over the Changzhi spill has drawn attention to the growing problems with water use and pollution in China. In 2011, inspections in 200 cities across China found that water in 55 percent of the tests was rated “fairly poor to extremely poor”. During the last ten years, China has witnessed major pollution incidents due to the pursuit of economic benefit and the neglect of pollution control by local governments and enterprises. Deficiencies in emergency mechanisms to handle environmental incidents at some local governments worsen the pollution problems.

== See also ==
- Environmental issues in China
