= Anjiabao Township =

Anjiabao Township 安家堡乡
- Rural Township
- Ānjiābăo Xiāng
- Location in Hebei Location in China
- Coordinates: 40°43′19″N 114°37′36″E
- Country: People's Republic of China
- Province: Hebei
- Prefecture-level city: Zhangjiakou
- District: Wanquan

Area
  - Total: 110.0 km^{2} (42.5 sq mi)

Population (2010)
  - Total: 21,661
  - Density: 196.9/km^{2} (510/sq mi)
- Time zone: UTC+8 (China Standard)

Anjiabao Township (Chinese: 安家堡乡; pinyin: Ānjiābăo Xiāng) is a rural township located in Wanquan District, Zhangjiakou, Hebei, China. According to the 2010 census, Anjiabao Township had a population of 21,661, including 10,937 males and 10,724 females. The population was distributed as follows: 3,759 people aged under 14, 15,185 people aged between 15 and 64, and 2,717 people aged over 65.

== See also ==
- List of township-level divisions of Hebei
