= Beixintun Township =

Beixintun Township 北新屯乡
- Rural Township
- Běixīntún Xiāng
- Location in Hebei Location in China
- Coordinates: 40°53′30″N 114°37′59″E
- Country: People's Republic of China
- Province: Hebei
- Prefecture-level city: Zhangjiakou
- District: Wanquan

Area
  - Total: 189.8 km^{2} (73.3 sq mi)

Population (2010)
  - Total: 5,718
  - Density: 30.12/km^{2} (78.0/sq mi)
- Time zone: UTC+8 (China Standard)

Beixintun Township (Chinese: 北新屯乡; pinyin: Běixīntún Xiāng) is a rural township located in Wanquan District, Zhangjiakou, Hebei, China. According to the 2010 census, Beixintun Township had a population of 5,718, including 3,002 males and 2,716 females. The population was distributed as follows: 665 people aged under 14, 3,977 people aged between 15 and 64, and 1,076 people aged over 65.

== See also ==
- List of township-level divisions of Hebei
