= Chaigoubu =

Coordinates: 37.78676°N 114.61075°E

Chaigoubu 柴沟堡镇
- Town

Chinese transcription(s)
- Interactive map of Chaigoubu
- Country: China
- Province: Hebei
- Prefecture: Zhangjiakou
- County: Huai'an County

Population
  - Total: 73,028
- Time zone: UTC+8 (China Standard Time)
- Postal code: 076150

Chaigoubu (simplified Chinese: 柴沟堡; traditional Chinese: 柴溝堡; pinyin: cháigōubǔ) is a township-level division of Huai'an County, Zhangjiakou, Hebei, China. It is also the seat of the People's government of Huai'an County.

== See also ==
- List of township-level divisions of Hebei
