= Dukoubao Township =

Dukoubao Township 渡口堡乡
- Rural Township
- Dùkŏubăo Xiāng
- Location in Hebei Location in China
- Coordinates: 40°41′13″N 114°16′48″E
- Country: People's Republic of China
- Province: Hebei
- Prefecture-level city: Zhangjiakou
- County: Huai'an

Area
  - Total: 204.9 km^{2} (79.1 sq mi)

Population (2010)
  - Total: 13,296
  - Density: 64.9/km^{2} (168/sq mi)
- Time zone: UTC+8 (China Standard)

Dukoubao Township (Chinese: 渡口堡乡; pinyin: Dùkŏubăo Xiāng) is a rural township located in Huai'an County, Zhangjiakou, Hebei, China. According to the 2010 census, Dukoubao Township had a population of 13,296, including 6,777 males and 6,519 females. The population was distributed as follows: 2,056 people aged under 14, 9,303 people aged between 15 and 64, and 1,937 people aged over 65.

== See also ==
- List of township-level divisions of Hebei
