= Beishacheng Township =

Beishacheng Township 北沙城乡
- Rural Township
- Běishāchéng Xiāng
- Location in Hebei Location in China
- Coordinates: 40°42′26″N 114°27′28″E
- Country: People's Republic of China
- Province: Hebei
- Prefecture-level city: Zhangjiakou
- District: Wanquan

Area
  - Total: 52.99 km^{2} (20.46 sq mi)

Population (2010)
  - Total: 15,695
  - Density: 296.2/km^{2} (767/sq mi)
- Time zone: UTC+8 (China Standard)

Beishacheng Township (Chinese: 北沙城乡; pinyin: Běishāchéng Xiāng) is a rural township located in Wanquan District, Zhangjiakou, Hebei, China. According to the 2010 census, Beishacheng Township had a population of 15,695, including 7,862 males and 7,833 females. The population was distributed as follows: 2,765 people aged under 14, 10,726 people aged between 15 and 64, and 2,204 people aged over 65.

== See also ==
- List of township-level divisions of Hebei
