= Wanquan, Zhangjiakou =

Wanquan 万全区 Wanchuan; Wanchüan
- District
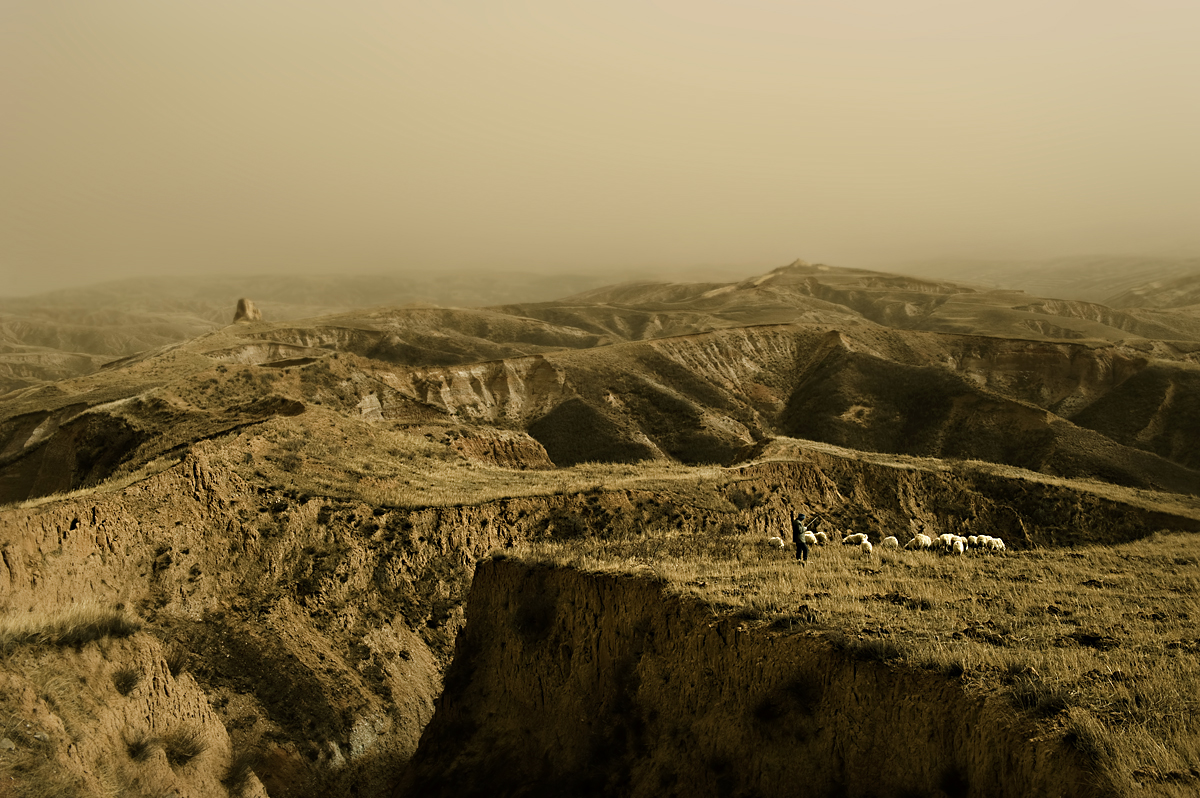

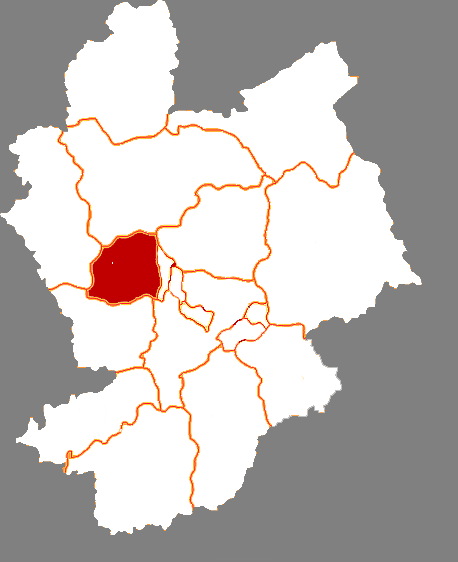
- Wanquan in Zhangjiakou

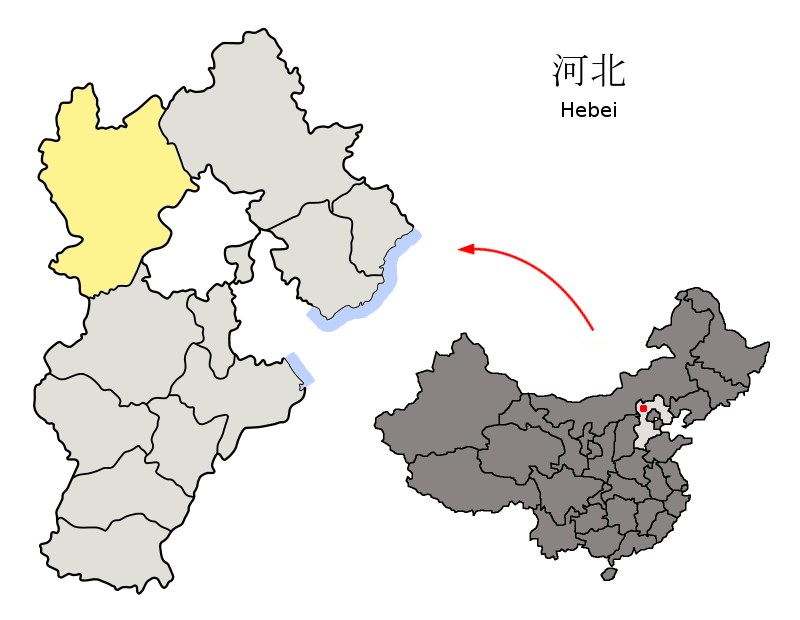
- Zhangjiakou in Hebei
- Coordinates: 40°46′01″N 114°44′28″E
- Country: People's Republic of China
- Province: Hebei
- Prefecture-level city: Zhangjiakou
- District seat: Kongjiazhuang Town (孔家庄镇)

Area
  - Total: 1,158 km^{2} (447 sq mi)
- Elevation: 751 m (2,464 ft)

Population (2020 census)
  - Total: 216,795
  - Density: 187.2/km^{2} (484.9/sq mi)
- Time zone: UTC+8 (China Standard)
- Postal code: 066250
- Area code: 0313

Wanquan (simplified Chinese: 万全区; traditional Chinese: 萬全區; pinyin: Wànquán Qū) is a district of the city of Zhangjiakou, in the northwest of Hebei province, China, located just to the southwest of Zhangjiakou's urban core. It was the site of the Battle of the Badger's Mouth Pass, one of the major campaigns in the Mongol–Jin War.

== Administrative divisions ==
The district administers 4 towns and 7 townships:

Towns:

- Kongjiazhuang (孔家庄镇), Wanquan (万全镇), Ximalin (洗马林镇), Guoleizhuang (郭磊庄镇)

Townships:

- Shanfangbu Township (膳房堡乡), Beixintun Township (北新屯乡), Xuanpingbu Township (宣平堡乡), Gaomiaobao Township (高庙堡乡), Jiubu Township (旧堡乡), Anjiabao Township (安家堡乡), Beishacheng Township (北沙城乡)

== Geography and climate ==
Wanquan is located in the northwest of Hebei province. Its western and northern borders are defined by the Great Wall, across which it borders Shangyi and Zhangbei counties. The southern border is defined by the Yang River (洋河), across which it borders Huai'an County. The district stretches 35 kilometres (22 mi) north to south and spans 37 km (23 mi) east to west. Wanquan has a rather dry, monsoon-influenced humid continental climate, with an annual mean temperature of 8.3 °C (46.9 °F) and precipitation amounting to 367.6 mm (14.47 in).

Climate data for Wanquan, elevation 755 m (2,477 ft), (1991–2020 normals, extremes 1981–present)
Month	Jan	Feb	Mar	Apr	May	Jun	Jul	Aug	Sep	Oct	Nov	Dec	Year
Record high °C (°F)	10.0 (50.0)	17.4 (63.3)	26.6 (79.9)	32.7 (90.9)	37.4 (99.3)	38.7 (101.7)	39.0 (102.2)	36.7 (98.1)	35.1 (95.2)	28.0 (82.4)	20.2 (68.4)	14.1 (57.4)	39.0 (102.2)
Mean daily maximum °C (°F)	−2.2 (28.0)	2.3 (36.1)	9.7 (49.5)	18.3 (64.9)	25.0 (77.0)	28.7 (83.7)	29.8 (85.6)	28.4 (83.1)	23.7 (74.7)	16.0 (60.8)	6.3 (43.3)	−0.9 (30.4)	15.4 (59.8)
Daily mean °C (°F)	−9.2 (15.4)	−5.0 (23.0)	2.3 (36.1)	10.9 (51.6)	17.9 (64.2)	22.0 (71.6)	23.8 (74.8)	22.3 (72.1)	16.7 (62.1)	8.9 (48.0)	−0.2 (31.6)	−7.3 (18.9)	8.6 (47.4)
Mean daily minimum °C (°F)	−14.5 (5.9)	−10.8 (12.6)	−4.0 (24.8)	3.9 (39.0)	10.9 (51.6)	15.8 (60.4)	18.6 (65.5)	16.9 (62.4)	10.8 (51.4)	3.3 (37.9)	−5.1 (22.8)	−12.2 (10.0)	2.8 (37.0)
Record low °C (°F)	−29.0 (−20.2)	−25.3 (−13.5)	−20.2 (−4.4)	−8.0 (17.6)	−0.6 (30.9)	3.6 (38.5)	9.5 (49.1)	5.6 (42.1)	−1.0 (30.2)	−11.2 (11.8)	−23.4 (−10.1)	−25.8 (−14.4)	−29.0 (−20.2)
Average precipitation mm (inches)	2.3 (0.09)	3.0 (0.12)	8.3 (0.33)	19.7 (0.78)	34.5 (1.36)	60.4 (2.38)	93.8 (3.69)	71.8 (2.83)	53.0 (2.09)	22.2 (0.87)	8.1 (0.32)	2.3 (0.09)	379.4 (14.95)
Average precipitation days (≥ 0.1 mm)	1.8	2.1	3.6	4.6	7.2	11.1	12.1	11.2	8.7	5.2	3.2	1.7	72.5
Average snowy days	2.9	3.3	3.5	1.3	0	0	0	0	0	0.3	3.3	2.7	17.3
Average relative humidity (%)	45	40	37	36	38	52	65	66	61	53	49	46	49
Mean monthly sunshine hours	208.0	206.9	254.7	261.4	290.0	258.5	253.3	255.0	226.8	222.8	197.0	193.7	2,828.1
Percentage possible sunshine	70	68	68	65	65	57	56	60	61	66	67	68	64
Source: China Meteorological Administrationall-time May high

== Transport ==
- China National Highway 110
- China National Highway 207
- G6 Beijing–Lhasa Expressway
