= Gaomiaobao Township =

Gaomiaobao Township 高庙堡乡
- Rural Township
- Gāomiàobăo Xiāng
- Location in Hebei Location in China
- Coordinates: 40°47′34″N 114°30′50″E
- Country: People's Republic of China
- Province: Hebei
- Prefecture-level city: Zhangjiakou
- District: Wanquan

Area
  - Total: 130.8 km^{2} (50.5 sq mi)

Population (2010)
  - Total: 9,916
  - Density: 75.84/km^{2} (196.4/sq mi)
- Time zone: UTC+8 (China Standard)

Gaomiaobao Township (Chinese: 高庙堡乡; pinyin: Gāomiàobăo Xiāng) is a rural township located in Wanquan District, Zhangjiakou, Hebei, China. According to the 2010 census, Gaomiaobao Township had a population of 9,916, including 5,264 males and 4,652 females. The population was distributed as follows: 1,439 people aged under 14, 6,694 people aged between 15 and 64, and 1,783 people aged over 65.

== See also ==
- List of township-level divisions of Hebei
