= Pingshun County =

Pingshun County 平顺县
- County
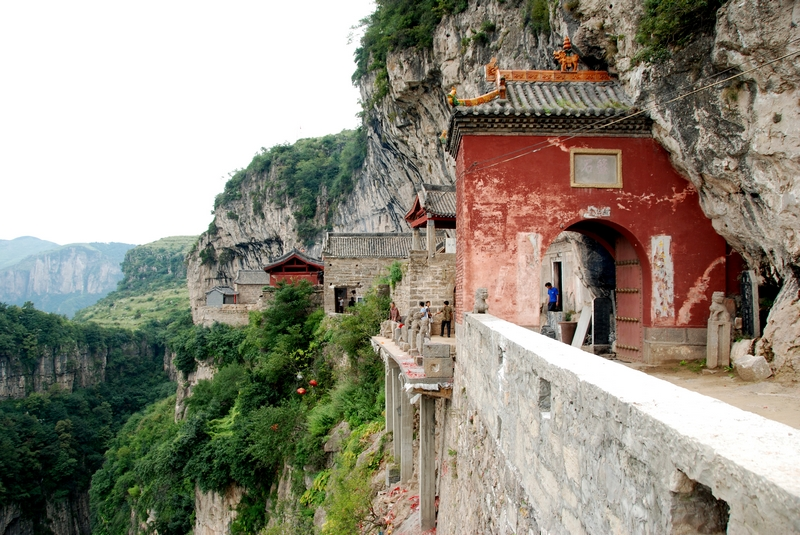
- Jindeng Temple

- Location of the seat in Pingshun
- Coordinates: 36°12′00″N 113°26′10″E
- Country: People's Republic of China
- Province: Shanxi
- Prefecture-level city: Changzhi

Population (2020)
  - Total: 115,927
- Time zone: UTC+8 (China Standard)

Pingshun County (simplified Chinese: 平顺县; traditional Chinese: 平順縣; pinyin: Píngshùn Xiàn) is a county in the southeast of Shanxi province, China, bordering the provinces of Hebei to the northeast and Henan to the east. It is under the administration of Changzhi city.

== Climate ==
Climate data for Pingshun, elevation 1,089 m (3,573 ft), (1991–2020 normals, extremes 1981–2010)
Month	Jan	Feb	Mar	Apr	May	Jun	Jul	Aug	Sep	Oct	Nov	Dec	Year
Record high °C (°F)	16.6 (61.9)	23.0 (73.4)	27.8 (82.0)	33.5 (92.3)	35.3 (95.5)	37.0 (98.6)	35.8 (96.4)	33.7 (92.7)	34.0 (93.2)	28.4 (83.1)	23.3 (73.9)	17.4 (63.3)	37.0 (98.6)
Mean daily maximum °C (°F)	1.9 (35.4)	5.4 (41.7)	11.4 (52.5)	18.4 (65.1)	23.5 (74.3)	27.1 (80.8)	27.7 (81.9)	26.0 (78.8)	22.1 (71.8)	16.6 (61.9)	9.8 (49.6)	3.5 (38.3)	16.1 (61.0)
Daily mean °C (°F)	−4.7 (23.5)	−1.3 (29.7)	4.5 (40.1)	11.4 (52.5)	16.7 (62.1)	20.5 (68.9)	21.9 (71.4)	20.2 (68.4)	15.6 (60.1)	9.8 (49.6)	3.1 (37.6)	−2.9 (26.8)	9.6 (49.2)
Mean daily minimum °C (°F)	−9.2 (15.4)	−6.1 (21.0)	−0.9 (30.4)	5.1 (41.2)	10.2 (50.4)	14.3 (57.7)	17.0 (62.6)	15.7 (60.3)	10.8 (51.4)	4.8 (40.6)	−1.4 (29.5)	−7.3 (18.9)	4.4 (40.0)
Record low °C (°F)	−21.6 (−6.9)	−18.3 (−0.9)	−12.5 (9.5)	−6.4 (20.5)	0.6 (33.1)	6.7 (44.1)	11.1 (52.0)	7.8 (46.0)	0.8 (33.4)	−5.3 (22.5)	−17.3 (0.9)	−20.7 (−5.3)	−21.6 (−6.9)
Average precipitation mm (inches)	4.8 (0.19)	10.0 (0.39)	10.4 (0.41)	33.0 (1.30)	51.5 (2.03)	73.6 (2.90)	143.7 (5.66)	130.8 (5.15)	63.5 (2.50)	34.1 (1.34)	18.0 (0.71)	5.0 (0.20)	578.4 (22.78)
Average precipitation days (≥ 0.1 mm)	3.8	4.1	4.8	6.5	8.2	10.7	14.6	13.4	9.5	7.2	4.8	3.3	90.9
Average snowy days	4.9	5.4	4.3	1.0	0	0	0	0	0	0.2	3.0	4.1	22.9
Average relative humidity (%)	50	51	47	48	52	61	75	78	73	64	57	51	59
Mean monthly sunshine hours	184.2	181.6	215.7	239.8	263.0	234.0	219.1	215.5	191.6	199.2	182.5	185.2	2,511.4
Percentage possible sunshine	59	59	58	61	60	54	50	52	52	58	60	62	57
Source: China Meteorological Administration

== Notable Persons ==
- Shen Jilan
