= Jiaoqu, Changzhi =

Jiaoqu 郊区
- District
- Location in Shanxi
- Coordinates: 36°12′04″N 113°07′36″E
- Country: People's Republic of China
- Province: Shanxi
- Prefecture-level city: Changzhi

Area
  - Total: 285 km^{2} (110 sq mi)

Population
  - Total: 290,000
  - Density: 1,000/km^{2} (2,600/sq mi)
- Time zone: UTC+8 (China Standard)
- Postal code: 046021
- Website: http://www.jqzf.changzhi.gov.cn/

Jiaoqu (simplified Chinese: 郊区; traditional Chinese: 郊區; pinyin: Jiāoqū; lit. 'suburban district') is a district of Changzhi, Shanxi, China. It has an area of 285 square kilometres (110 sq mi) and a population of 290,000.
