= Feixiang, Handan =

Feixiang 肥乡区 Feisiang
- District
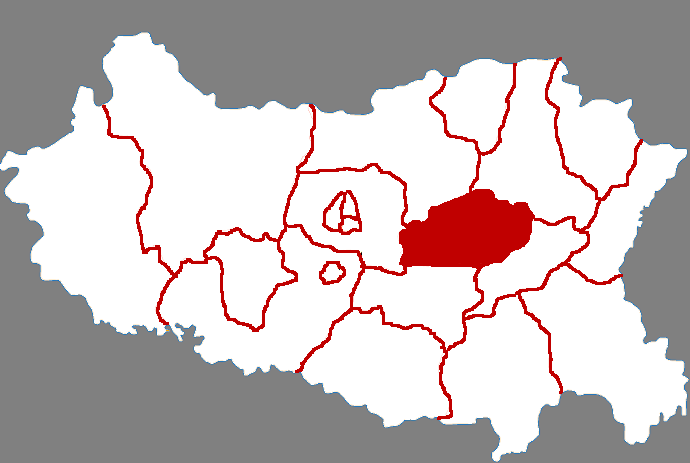
- Location of Feixiang county

- Location in Hebei
- Coordinates: 36°33′N 114°49′E
- Country: People's Republic of China
- Province: Hebei
- Prefecture-level city: Handan
- Township-level divisions: 2 towns 7 townships
- County seat: Feixiang Town (肥乡镇)

Area
  - Total: 496 km^{2} (192 sq mi)
- Elevation: 53 m (174 ft)

Population (2020 census)
  - Total: 372,265
  - Density: 751/km^{2} (1,940/sq mi)
- Time zone: UTC+8 (China Standard)
- Postal code: 057550

Feixiang (simplified Chinese: 肥乡; traditional Chinese: 肥鄉; pinyin: Féixiāng) is a district of southern Hebei province, China, served directly by China National Highway 309. It is under the administration of Handan City, with a population of 372,265 (2020 census) residing in an area of 496 km^{2} (192 sq mi).

== Administrative divisions ==
There are 2 towns and 7 townships under the county's administration.

Towns:

- Feixiang (肥乡镇), Tiantaishan (天台山镇)

Townships:

- Daxihan Township (大西韩乡), Xin'anzhen Township (辛安镇乡), Maoyanbao Township (毛演堡乡), Yuangu Township (元固乡), Tunzhuangying Township (屯庄营乡), Dongzhangbao Township (东漳堡乡), Jiudian Township (旧店乡)

== Climate ==
Climate data for Feixiang, elevation 50 m (160 ft), (1991–2020 normals, extremes 1981–present)
Month	Jan	Feb	Mar	Apr	May	Jun	Jul	Aug	Sep	Oct	Nov	Dec	Year
Record high °C (°F)	19.5 (67.1)	25.4 (77.7)	30.9 (87.6)	35.5 (95.9)	40.2 (104.4)	42.3 (108.1)	41.2 (106.2)	37.5 (99.5)	39.1 (102.4)	33.5 (92.3)	27.6 (81.7)	25.3 (77.5)	42.3 (108.1)
Mean daily maximum °C (°F)	3.9 (39.0)	8.4 (47.1)	15.0 (59.0)	21.6 (70.9)	27.4 (81.3)	32.4 (90.3)	32.2 (90.0)	30.4 (86.7)	27.0 (80.6)	21.4 (70.5)	12.6 (54.7)	5.6 (42.1)	19.8 (67.7)
Daily mean °C (°F)	−2.1 (28.2)	1.9 (35.4)	8.4 (47.1)	15.0 (59.0)	20.8 (69.4)	25.9 (78.6)	27.1 (80.8)	25.5 (77.9)	20.8 (69.4)	14.5 (58.1)	6.3 (43.3)	−0.2 (31.6)	13.7 (56.6)
Mean daily minimum °C (°F)	−6.6 (20.1)	−3.0 (26.6)	2.7 (36.9)	9.0 (48.2)	14.7 (58.5)	20.0 (68.0)	22.9 (73.2)	21.5 (70.7)	15.9 (60.6)	9.1 (48.4)	1.4 (34.5)	−4.4 (24.1)	8.6 (47.5)
Record low °C (°F)	−19.9 (−3.8)	−17.7 (0.1)	−8.8 (16.2)	−3.0 (26.6)	3.3 (37.9)	8.0 (46.4)	15.5 (59.9)	12.2 (54.0)	3.5 (38.3)	−2.6 (27.3)	−17.6 (0.3)	−18.5 (−1.3)	−19.9 (−3.8)
Average precipitation mm (inches)	3.0 (0.12)	6.6 (0.26)	9.0 (0.35)	30.1 (1.19)	39.8 (1.57)	55.9 (2.20)	153.1 (6.03)	95.1 (3.74)	46.0 (1.81)	27.2 (1.07)	14.6 (0.57)	4.0 (0.16)	484.4 (19.07)
Average precipitation days (≥ 0.1 mm)	1.8	3.0	2.7	5.1	6.3	7.7	10.9	8.6	6.9	5.1	4.2	2.3	64.6
Average snowy days	2.6	2.7	0.8	0.2	0	0	0	0	0	0	1.1	2.2	9.6
Average relative humidity (%)	63	59	56	62	64	61	78	82	76	70	69	67	67
Mean monthly sunshine hours	143.9	154.5	203.8	226.7	254.5	228.9	201.6	205.6	189.0	182.8	156.4	147.9	2,295.6
Percentage possible sunshine	46	50	55	57	58	52	46	50	51	53	52	49	52
Source: China Meteorological Administration all-time January high
