= Huai'an County =

County in Hebei, China

Huai'an County 怀安县 Hwaian
- County
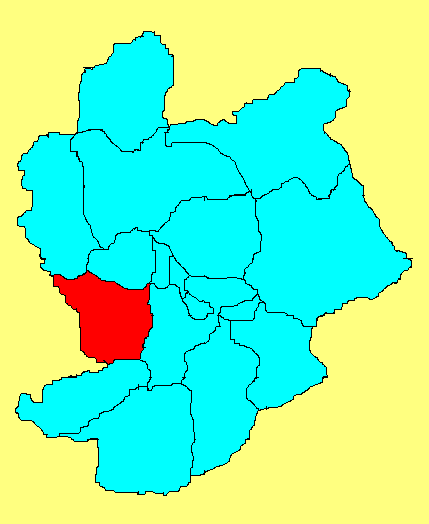
- Location in Zhangjiakou

- Location of the seat in Hebei
- Coordinates: 40°41′N 114°23′E
- Country: People's Republic of China
- Province: Hebei
- Prefecture-level city: Zhangjiakou

Area
  - Total: 1,705 km^{2} (658 sq mi)

Population (2020 census)
  - Total: 179,949
  - Density: 105.5/km^{2} (273.4/sq mi)
- Time zone: UTC+8 (China Standard)
- Website: http://www.zjkha.gov.cn/

Huai'an County (simplified Chinese: 怀安县; traditional Chinese: 懷安縣; pinyin: Huái'ān Xiàn) is a county in the northwest of Hebei, China. It is under the administration of Zhangjiakou City.

== Administrative Divisions ==
Towns:

- Chaigoubu (柴沟堡镇), Zuowei (左卫镇), Toubaihu (头百户镇), Huai'ancheng (怀安城镇)

Townships:

- Dukoubao Township (渡口堡乡), Diliutun Township (第六屯乡), Xiwanbu Township (西湾堡乡), Xishacheng Township (西沙城乡), Taipingzhuang Township (太平庄乡), Wanghutun Township (王虎屯乡), Disanbu Township (第三堡乡)

== Climate ==
Climate data for Huai'an, elevation 838 m (2,749 ft), (1991–2020 normals, extremes 1981–2010)
Month	Jan	Feb	Mar	Apr	May	Jun	Jul	Aug	Sep	Oct	Nov	Dec	Year
Record high °C (°F)	9.5 (49.1)	18.8 (65.8)	26.9 (80.4)	32.9 (91.2)	37.2 (99.0)	40.3 (104.5)	41.6 (106.9)	37.5 (99.5)	36.8 (98.2)	28.5 (83.3)	19.2 (66.6)	14.2 (57.6)	41.6 (106.9)
Mean daily maximum °C (°F)	−2.4 (27.7)	2.2 (36.0)	9.6 (49.3)	18.3 (64.9)	24.9 (76.8)	28.5 (83.3)	29.5 (85.1)	28.2 (82.8)	23.4 (74.1)	15.7 (60.3)	6.1 (43.0)	−1.1 (30.0)	15.2 (59.4)
Daily mean °C (°F)	−9.3 (15.3)	−5.0 (23.0)	2.2 (36.0)	10.7 (51.3)	17.6 (63.7)	21.6 (70.9)	23.3 (73.9)	21.7 (71.1)	16.1 (61.0)	8.6 (47.5)	−0.4 (31.3)	−7.5 (18.5)	8.3 (47.0)
Mean daily minimum °C (°F)	−14.5 (5.9)	−10.6 (12.9)	−4.0 (24.8)	3.5 (38.3)	10.4 (50.7)	15.1 (59.2)	17.9 (64.2)	16.3 (61.3)	10.3 (50.5)	3.0 (37.4)	−5.4 (22.3)	−12.3 (9.9)	2.5 (36.4)
Record low °C (°F)	−31.0 (−23.8)	−24.6 (−12.3)	−21.5 (−6.7)	−7.1 (19.2)	−0.5 (31.1)	4.7 (40.5)	9.3 (48.7)	6.6 (43.9)	−0.9 (30.4)	−10.4 (13.3)	−21.1 (−6.0)	−24.9 (−12.8)	−31.0 (−23.8)
Average precipitation mm (inches)	2.1 (0.08)	3.3 (0.13)	8.1 (0.32)	18.4 (0.72)	35.5 (1.40)	64.1 (2.52)	101.3 (3.99)	65.9 (2.59)	53.3 (2.10)	21.2 (0.83)	8.7 (0.34)	2.0 (0.08)	383.9 (15.1)
Average precipitation days (≥ 0.1 mm)	1.9	2.6	3.9	4.9	7.5	12.1	12.9	11.4	9.1	5.4	3.3	2.0	77
Average snowy days	3.1	4.0	4.3	1.4	0	0	0	0	0	0.4	3.5	3.0	19.7
Average relative humidity (%)	47	43	39	37	40	54	68	69	63	55	52	48	51
Mean monthly sunshine hours	195.8	195.4	236.4	250.9	272.4	246.8	238.8	240.1	225.2	220.9	188.9	182.8	2,694.4
Percentage possible sunshine	65	64	63	63	61	55	53	57	61	65	64	64	61
Source: China Meteorological Administration
