= Licheng County =

Licheng County 黎城县
- County
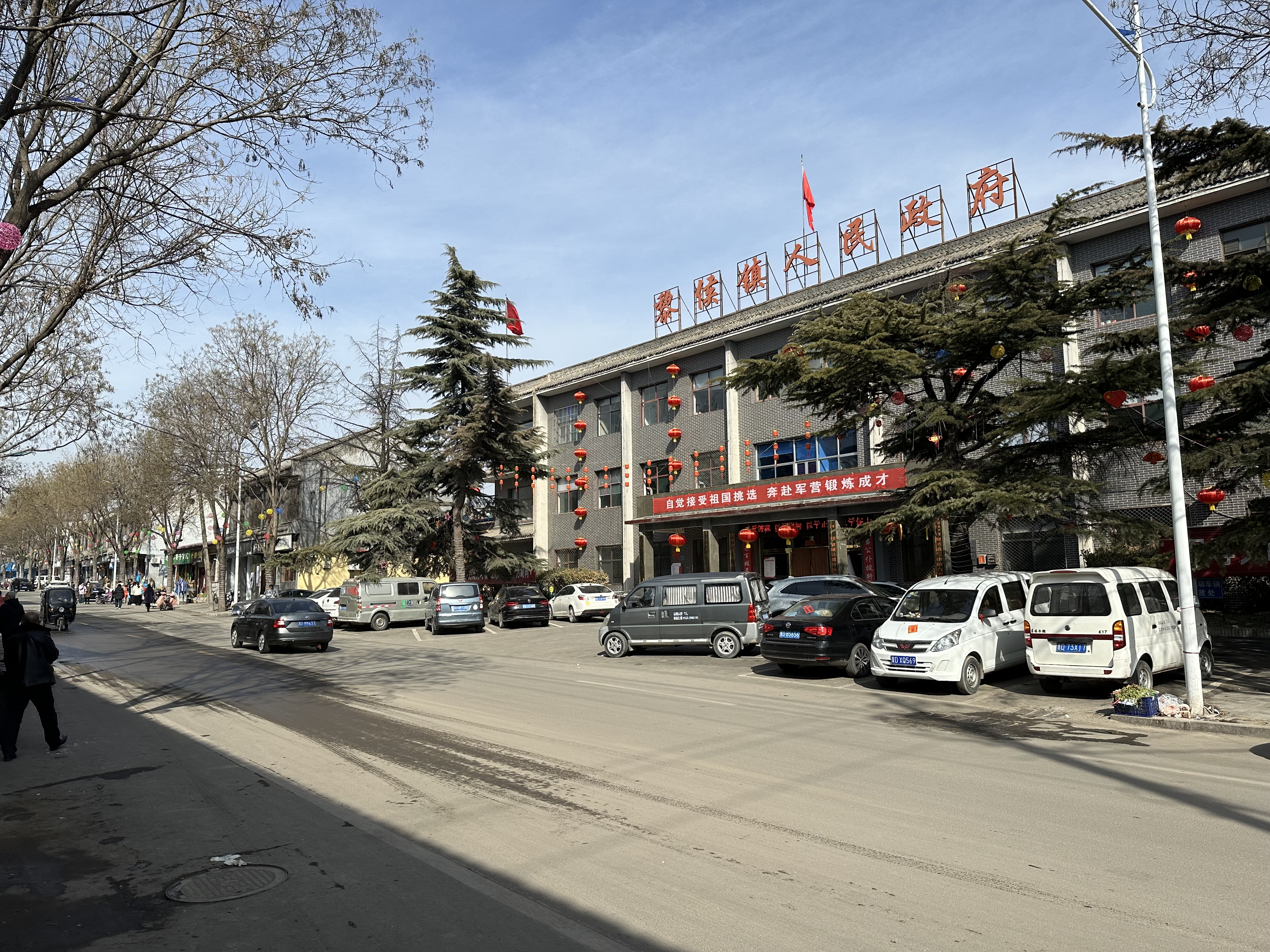
- Lihou Town Government Office Building in Licheng County, Shanxi

- Location of the seat in Shanxi
- Coordinates: 36°40′N 113°25′E
- Country: People's Republic of China
- Province: Shanxi
- Prefecture-level city: Changzhi

Area
  - Total: 1,166 km^{2} (450 sq mi)

Population (2002)
  - Total: 160,000
  - Density: 140/km^{2} (360/sq mi)
- Time zone: UTC+8 (China Standard)
- Postal code: 047600
- Area code: 0355
- Website: www.sxlc.gov.cn

Licheng County (Chinese: 黎城县; pinyin: Líchéng Xiàn) is a county in the southeast of Shanxi province, China, bordering Hebei province to the east. It is under the administration of Changzhi city.

== Climate ==
Climate data for Licheng, elevation 781 m (2,562 ft), (1991–2020 normals, extremes 1981–present)
Month	Jan	Feb	Mar	Apr	May	Jun	Jul	Aug	Sep	Oct	Nov	Dec	Year
Record high °C (°F)	18.0 (64.4)	24.3 (75.7)	30.2 (86.4)	36.4 (97.5)	37.2 (99.0)	40.2 (104.4)	39.3 (102.7)	36.5 (97.7)	36.2 (97.2)	32.1 (89.8)	25.7 (78.3)	19.1 (66.4)	40.2 (104.4)
Mean daily maximum °C (°F)	3.8 (38.8)	7.3 (45.1)	13.6 (56.5)	20.6 (69.1)	25.7 (78.3)	29.3 (84.7)	29.8 (85.6)	28.1 (82.6)	24.1 (75.4)	18.8 (65.8)	11.7 (53.1)	5.2 (41.4)	18.2 (64.7)
Daily mean °C (°F)	−3.6 (25.5)	−0.1 (31.8)	6.0 (42.8)	13.0 (55.4)	18.4 (65.1)	22.2 (72.0)	23.8 (74.8)	22.3 (72.1)	17.4 (63.3)	11.4 (52.5)	4.4 (39.9)	−1.7 (28.9)	11.1 (52.0)
Mean daily minimum °C (°F)	−8.9 (16.0)	−5.5 (22.1)	0.0 (32.0)	6.2 (43.2)	11.5 (52.7)	15.9 (60.6)	19.1 (66.4)	17.8 (64.0)	12.2 (54.0)	5.7 (42.3)	−0.9 (30.4)	−6.6 (20.1)	5.5 (42.0)
Record low °C (°F)	−21.5 (−6.7)	−18.8 (−1.8)	−12.1 (10.2)	−5.4 (22.3)	1.9 (35.4)	6.5 (43.7)	12.0 (53.6)	9.9 (49.8)	1.5 (34.7)	−5.7 (21.7)	−17.6 (0.3)	−22.0 (−7.6)	−22.0 (−7.6)
Average precipitation mm (inches)	3.5 (0.14)	7.3 (0.29)	9.3 (0.37)	29.8 (1.17)	43.9 (1.73)	65.2 (2.57)	130.2 (5.13)	110.8 (4.36)	59.7 (2.35)	31.0 (1.22)	16.5 (0.65)	3.0 (0.12)	510.2 (20.1)
Average precipitation days (≥ 0.1 mm)	2.6	3.4	3.6	5.5	7.1	10.3	13.0	11.3	8.8	6.1	4.4	2.3	78.4
Average snowy days	3.8	4.5	2.5	0.6	0	0	0	0	0	0.1	2.0	3.3	16.8
Average relative humidity (%)	51	51	48	50	54	62	75	78	75	66	59	52	60
Mean monthly sunshine hours	155.3	158.2	190.9	216.7	235.4	203.3	185.4	181.5	163.5	171.4	163.7	160.8	2,186.1
Percentage possible sunshine	50	51	51	55	54	47	42	44	44	50	54	54	50
Source: China Meteorological Administrationall-time February high
