= Qinshui County =

Coordinates: 35°41′31″N 112°11′08″E

Qinshui County 沁水县 Tsinshui
- County
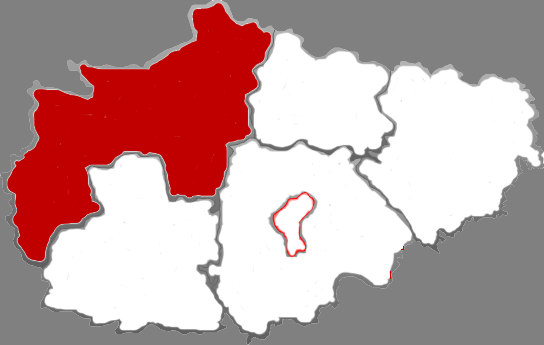
- Qinshui in Jincheng

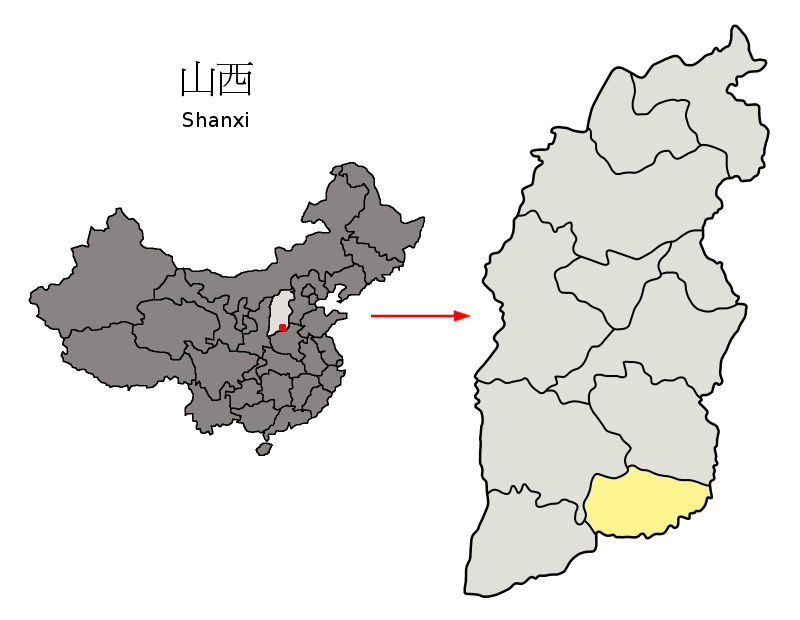
- Jincheng in Shanxi
- Country: People's Republic of China
- Province: Shanxi
- Prefecture-level city: Jincheng
- Time zone: UTC+8 (China Standard)

Qinshui County (Chinese: 沁水县; pinyin: Qìnshuǐ Xiàn) is a county in the southeast of Shanxi province, China. It is under the administration of Jincheng City, and is both its northernmost and westernmost county-level division.

== Climate ==
Climate data for Qinshui, elevation 887 m (2,910 ft), (1991–2020 normals, extremes 1981–present)
Month	Jan	Feb	Mar	Apr	May	Jun	Jul	Aug	Sep	Oct	Nov	Dec	Year
Record high °C (°F)	14.5 (58.1)	22.6 (72.7)	28.9 (84.0)	35.4 (95.7)	36.4 (97.5)	38.6 (101.5)	38.0 (100.4)	35.2 (95.4)	36.3 (97.3)	29.1 (84.4)	24.8 (76.6)	17.3 (63.1)	38.6 (101.5)
Mean daily maximum °C (°F)	3.0 (37.4)	6.6 (43.9)	12.8 (55.0)	19.8 (67.6)	24.7 (76.5)	28.5 (83.3)	29.2 (84.6)	27.6 (81.7)	23.2 (73.8)	17.6 (63.7)	10.8 (51.4)	4.4 (39.9)	17.4 (63.2)
Daily mean °C (°F)	−3.2 (26.2)	0.0 (32.0)	5.6 (42.1)	12.3 (54.1)	17.5 (63.5)	21.5 (70.7)	23.3 (73.9)	21.9 (71.4)	17.0 (62.6)	11.0 (51.8)	4.4 (39.9)	−1.6 (29.1)	10.8 (51.4)
Mean daily minimum °C (°F)	−7.9 (17.8)	−4.8 (23.4)	0.2 (32.4)	6.1 (43.0)	11.1 (52.0)	15.4 (59.7)	18.8 (65.8)	17.8 (64.0)	12.6 (54.7)	6.3 (43.3)	−0.3 (31.5)	−6.0 (21.2)	5.8 (42.4)
Record low °C (°F)	−18.0 (−0.4)	−18.7 (−1.7)	−9.8 (14.4)	−5.4 (22.3)	1.1 (34.0)	7.1 (44.8)	11.1 (52.0)	10.6 (51.1)	2.1 (35.8)	−4.6 (23.7)	−13.8 (7.2)	−17.4 (0.7)	−18.7 (−1.7)
Average precipitation mm (inches)	7.5 (0.30)	11.3 (0.44)	15.7 (0.62)	38.2 (1.50)	48.9 (1.93)	65.0 (2.56)	131.3 (5.17)	101.7 (4.00)	79.6 (3.13)	42.6 (1.68)	20.5 (0.81)	4.6 (0.18)	566.9 (22.32)
Average precipitation days (≥ 0.1 mm)	4.2	4.7	5.2	6.4	8.0	9.9	12.8	11.5	9.9	7.0	5.2	3.0	87.8
Average snowy days	4.8	5.4	3.4	0.5	0	0	0	0	0	0.2	2.2	3.8	20.3
Average relative humidity (%)	50	53	51	52	55	61	74	77	74	67	59	50	60
Mean monthly sunshine hours	181.7	178.4	211.1	236.8	257.4	242.1	215.3	199.7	180.0	187.6	182.7	188.4	2,461.2
Percentage possible sunshine	58	57	56	60	59	56	49	48	49	54	60	62	56
Source: China Meteorological Administration

== Transportation ==
- Houma–Yueshan Railway
