= Luzhou District, Changzhi =

Luzhou 潞州区
- District
- Location in Shanxi
- Coordinates (Luzhou District government): 36°12′12″N 113°07′22″E
- Country: People's Republic of China
- Province: Shanxi
- Prefecture-level city: Changzhi

Area
  - Total: 285 km^{2} (110 sq mi)

Population
  - Total: 290,000
  - Density: 1,000/km^{2} (2,600/sq mi)
- Time zone: UTC+8 (China Standard)
- Postal code: 046021
- Website: http://www.jqzf.changzhi.gov.cn/

Luzhou District (simplified Chinese: 潞州区; traditional Chinese: 潞州區; pinyin: Lùzhōu Qū), formerly known as Chengqu (simplified Chinese: 城区; traditional Chinese: 城區; pinyin: Chéngqū; lit. 'urban district') or Cheng District is a district of Changzhi, Shanxi, China. It has an area of 55.6 km^{2} (21.5 sq mi) and a population of 416,000.

Changzhi East railway station is located here.
