= Changzhi =

Changzhi 长治市 Ch'ang-chih
- Prefecture-level city
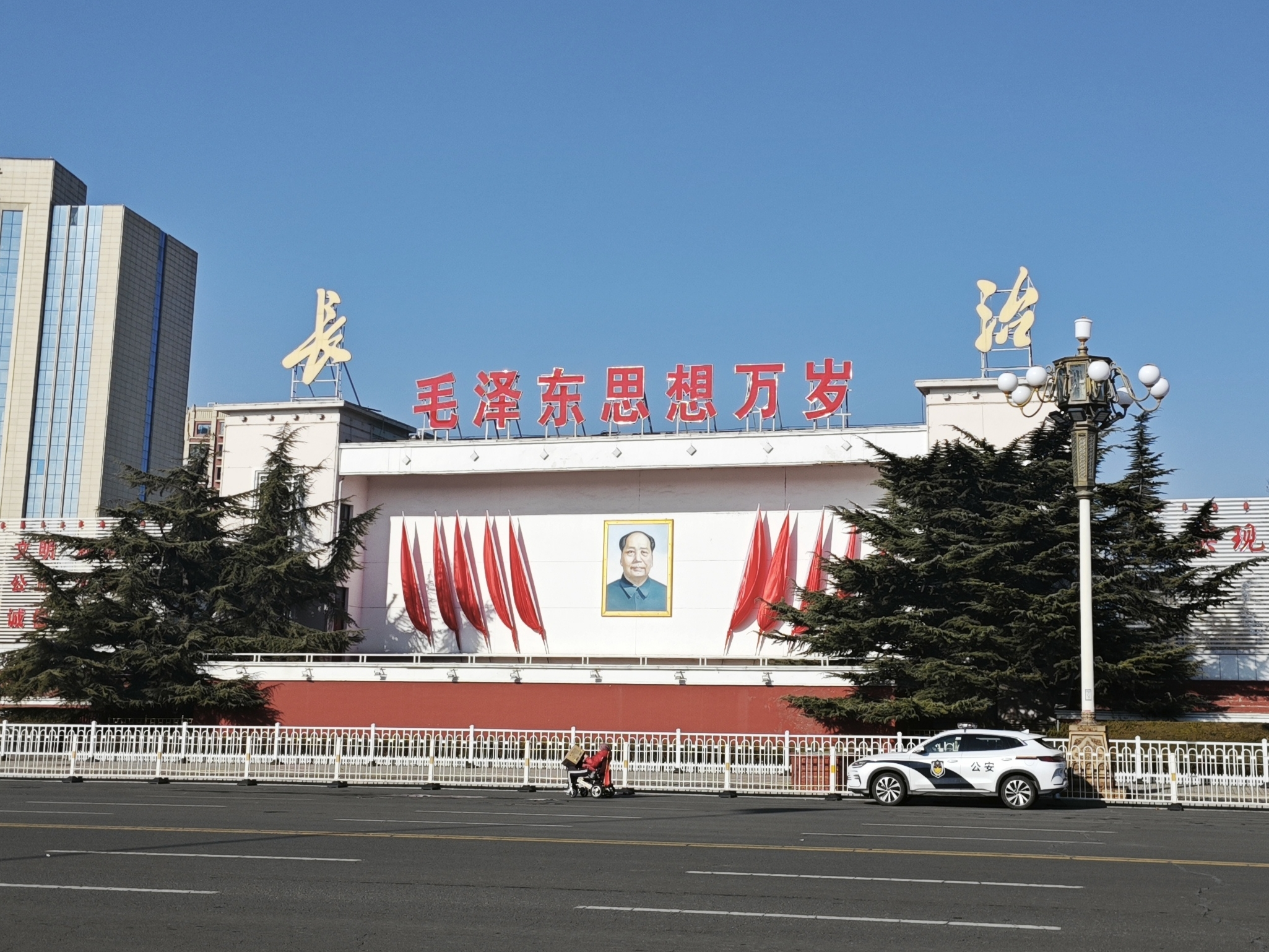
- Changzhi Bayi Square rostrum

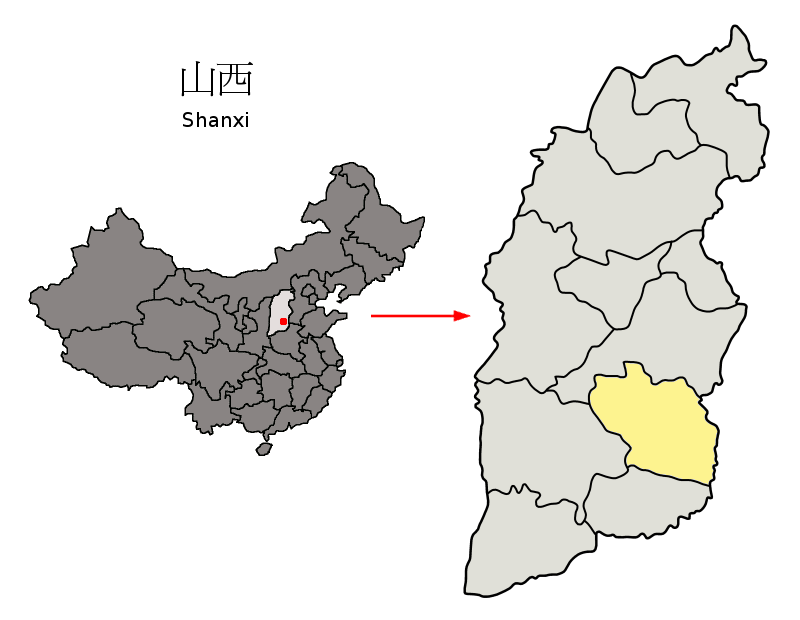
- Location of Changzhi City jurisdiction in Shanxi

- Location of the city center in Shanxi
- Coordinates (Changzhi government): 36°11′42″N 113°6′40″E
- Country: People's Republic of China
- Province: Shanxi
- County-level divisions: 13
- Incorporated (city): 1945.10
- Municipal seat: Chengqu (Urban District)

Government
  - Type: Prefecture-level city
  - Communist Party Committee Secretary of Changzhi City: Ding Xiaoqiang (丁小强)
  - Mayor: Chen Xiangyang (陈向阳)

Area
  - Prefecture-level city: 13,976 km^{2} (5,396 sq mi)
  - Urban: 2,619 km^{2} (1,011 sq mi)
  - Metro: 818 km^{2} (316 sq mi)

Population (2020 census)
  - Prefecture-level city: 3,180,884
  - Density: 227.60/km^{2} (589.47/sq mi)
  - Urban: 1,687,952
  - Urban density: 644.5/km^{2} (1,669/sq mi)
  - Metro: 1,214,940
  - Metro density: 1,490/km^{2} (3,850/sq mi)

GDP
  - Prefecture-level city: CN¥ 171.2 billion US$ 26.9 billion
  - Per capita: CN¥ 53,810; US$ 8,610
- Time zone: UTC+8 (China Standard)
- Postal code: 046000
- Area code: 0355
- ISO 3166 code: CN-SX-04
- Licence Plate Prefix: 晋D
- Administrative division code: 140400
- Website: Official website

Changzhi
- Simplified Chinese: 长治
- Traditional Chinese: 長治
- Literal meaning: "Long Rule"
Transcriptions
Standard Mandarin
- Hanyu Pinyin: Chángzhì
- Wade–Giles: Ch'ang^{2}-chih^{4}
- IPA: [ʈʂʰǎŋ.ʈʂɻ̩̂]
Yue: Cantonese
- Yale Romanization: Chèuhngjih
- Jyutping: Coeng4-zi6
- IPA: [tsʰœŋ˩.tsi˨]

Changzhi (Chinese: 长治; pinyin: Chángzhì) is a prefecture-level city in the southeast of Shanxi Province, China, bordering the provinces of Hebei and Henan to the northeast and east, respectively. Historically, the city was one of the 36 administrative areas (see Administrative Divisions of Qin Dynasty) extant under the reign of Qin Shi Huang.

Changzhi is a transportation centre in Shanxi. Transportation is facilitated by four controlled-access highways (Taiyuan-Changzhi, Changzhi-Jincheng, Changzhi-Linfen, and Changzhi-Handan); two railways (Taiyuan–Jiaozuo Railway and Handan–Changzhi Railway); three national highways (China National Highway 207, 208 and 309); and Changzhi Wangcun Airport (ITAT Code: CIH, ICAO Code: ZBCZ). Internal transportation also includes a bus and taxi network.

The city is a rising commercial and industrial centre in the southeastern area of Shanxi. In 2011, its GDP ranked 1st out of 11 prefecture-level cities in the province. According to the latest census, in 2020 the city was home to 3,180,884 residents whom 1,214,940 lived in the built-up (or metro) area made of Luzhou and Shangdang Districts. The other two urban districts Tunliu and Lucheng are not conurbated yet.

== History ==
In ancient times, the area around Changzhi (Including Jincheng) was known as Shangdang. In the twenty-first year of King Xian of Zhou (348 BC), the Shangdang Commandery was established in roughly the area of modern-day city.

Changzhi was the site of the 1945 Shangdang Campaign, the first battle between the Kuomintang and the People's Liberation Army after the end of World War II. The campaign, which happened from August to October 1945, when the local Shanxi warlord, Yan Xishan, attempted to retake the region from Communist forces. Yan's forces were eventually defeated by an army led by Liu Bocheng, who was later named one of China's Ten Great Marshals. Liu's political commissar was Deng Xiaoping, who later became China's "paramount leader". The campaign ended with the complete destruction of Yan's army (Jinsui army, 晋绥军), most of which joined the Communists after surrendering. Following the Shangdang Campaign, the Communists remained in control of the region until they won the civil war in 1949.

The area under the control of People's Government of Changzhi City is divided into 12 county-level administration zones – 4 districts and 8 counties. The districts are Luzhou, Lucheng, Shangdang, and Tunliu; and the counties are Xiangyuan County, Pingshun County, Licheng County, Huguan County, Zhangzi County, Wuxiang County, Qin County, and Qinyuan County.

Map
Name	Hanzi	Hanyu Pinyin	Population (2003 est.)	Area (km^{2})	Density (/km^{2})
Luzhou District	潞州区	Lùzhōu Qū	706,000	340.6	2072.8
Lucheng District	潞城区	Lùchéng Qū	210,000	615	341
Shangdang District	上党区	Shàngdǎng Qū	320,000	483	663
Tunliu District	屯留区	Túnliú Qū	240,000	1,042	230
Xiangyuan County	襄垣县	Xiāngyuán Xiàn	250,000	1,158	216
Pingshun County	平顺县	Píngshùn Xiàn	160,000	1,550	103
Licheng County	黎城县	Líchéng Xiàn	160,000	1,166	137
Huguan County	壶关县	Húguān Xiàn	280,000	1,013	276
Zhangzi County	长子县	Zhǎngzǐ Xiàn	340,000	1,029	330
Wuxiang County	武乡县	Wǔxiāng Xiàn	210,000	1,610	130
Qin County	沁县	Qìn Xiàn	170,000	1,297	131
Qinyuan County	沁源县	Qìnyuán Xiàn	150,000	2,556	59

- Defunct – Jiao District (Chinese: 郊区; pinyin: Jiāoqū) is largely made up of suburban surround the city center of the metropolitan area.

== Geography ==
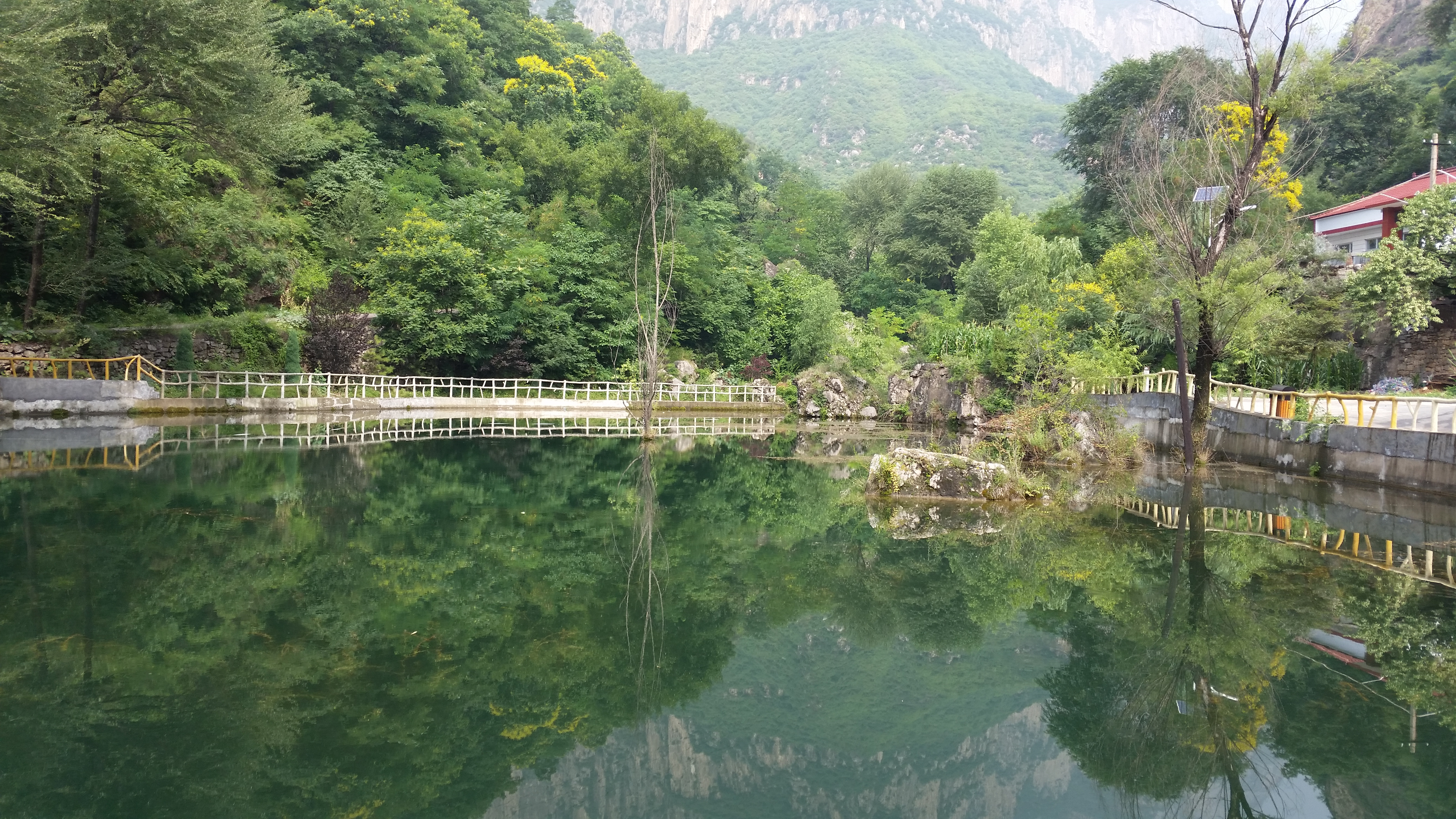
A view of the Taihang Mountains in Changzhi

Changzhi is located in southeastern Shanxi province, along the southern section of the Taihang Mountains. The majority of the city's area is mountainous, and much of the remaining geography is hilly in nature. The average elevation in the city is approximately 1,000 metres (3,300 ft) above sea level, with prominent peaks including Liyu Mountain (Chinese: 历峪山; pinyin: Lìyù Shān) and Shigao Mountain (Chinese: 石膏山; pinyin: Shígāo Shān), reaching 2,012 metres (6,601 ft) and 2,541 metres (8,337 ft) above sea level, respectively.

=== Climate ===
Changzhi has a rather dry, monsoon-influenced humid continental climate (Köppen Dwa), with cold and very dry winters, and very warm, somewhat humid summers. The monthly 24-hour average temperature ranges from −4.7 °C (23.5 °F) in January to 22.5 °C (72.5 °F) in July, and the annual mean is 9.89 °C (49.8 °F). Typifying the influence of the East Asian Monsoon, a majority of the annual 547 mm (21.5 in) of precipitation occurs from June to August.The annual sunshine hours are 2400–2600 hours, and the average annual frost-free period is 160–180 days.

Climate data for Changzhi, elevation 1,047 m (3,435 ft), (1991–2020 normals, extremes 1971–2010)
Month	Jan	Feb	Mar	Apr	May	Jun	Jul	Aug	Sep	Oct	Nov	Dec	Year
Record high °C (°F)	16.0 (60.8)	22.9 (73.2)	27.9 (82.2)	34.7 (94.5)	36.7 (98.1)	38.1 (100.6)	37.3 (99.1)	33.4 (92.1)	35.1 (95.2)	29.2 (84.6)	24.3 (75.7)	18.9 (66.0)	38.1 (100.6)
Mean daily maximum °C (°F)	2.3 (36.1)	5.9 (42.6)	12.1 (53.8)	19.2 (66.6)	24.2 (75.6)	27.7 (81.9)	28.3 (82.9)	26.8 (80.2)	22.8 (73.0)	17.3 (63.1)	10.1 (50.2)	3.7 (38.7)	16.7 (62.1)
Daily mean °C (°F)	−4.2 (24.4)	−0.7 (30.7)	5.2 (41.4)	12.1 (53.8)	17.5 (63.5)	21.3 (70.3)	22.5 (72.5)	21.0 (69.8)	16.5 (61.7)	10.7 (51.3)	3.8 (38.8)	−2.5 (27.5)	10.3 (50.5)
Mean daily minimum °C (°F)	−9.1 (15.6)	−5.6 (21.9)	−0.1 (31.8)	6.2 (43.2)	11.6 (52.9)	15.6 (60.1)	18.0 (64.4)	16.6 (61.9)	11.5 (52.7)	5.4 (41.7)	−1.2 (29.8)	−7.2 (19.0)	5.1 (41.2)
Record low °C (°F)	−21.9 (−7.4)	−19.4 (−2.9)	−15.0 (5.0)	−6.4 (20.5)	0.1 (32.2)	4.9 (40.8)	11.3 (52.3)	7.7 (45.9)	0.9 (33.6)	−6.8 (19.8)	−18.3 (−0.9)	−22.2 (−8.0)	−22.2 (−8.0)
Average precipitation mm (inches)	5.9 (0.23)	10.7 (0.42)	11.6 (0.46)	30.5 (1.20)	55.7 (2.19)	73.9 (2.91)	137.4 (5.41)	109.1 (4.30)	63.1 (2.48)	37.2 (1.46)	18.9 (0.74)	5.3 (0.21)	559.3 (22.01)
Average precipitation days (≥ 0.1 mm)	3.8	4.3	4.6	6.3	8.4	10.5	13.5	12.3	9.4	7.1	5.2	3.4	88.8
Average snowy days	4.9	5.3	3.7	0.9	0	0	0	0	0	0.1	2.6	4.3	21.8
Average relative humidity (%)	53	53	49	49	53	60	76	79	73	64	59	53	60
Mean monthly sunshine hours	175.8	173.0	206.6	236.8	258.5	231.2	212.1	203.4	177.7	185.6	177.2	181.9	2,419.8
Percentage possible sunshine	57	56	55	60	59	53	48	49	48	54	58	61	55
Source 1: China Meteorological Administration
Source 2: Weather China

=== Pollution ===
Changzhi's air quality index is monitored by China's Ministry of Environmental Protection (MEP) and its city government. A record of daily air quality is published by the local government.

In 2013, a major chemical spill occurred at a fertilizer plant in Changzhi operated by Tianji Coal Chemical Industry Group, polluting major waterways in the region, and impacting areas downstream, such as the city of Handan. Government officials in Handan blamed the city government of Changzhi for covering up the spill for five days, and remaining silent on the spill for the subsequent two months. In February 2013, the Xinhua News Agency announced the results of an official investigation into the spill, resulting in the punishment of 39 people, including then-mayor of Changzhi, Zhang Bao, who was removed from his position.

In 2019, officials from the Shanxi Provincial Government publicly reprimanded officials from seven cities within the province, including Changzhi, following a noticeable spike in pollution.

== Education ==
=== Higher education ===
- Changzhi Medical College
- Changzhi College

=== High schools ===
- Changzhi No.1 Middle School
- Changzhi No.2 Middle School
- Changzhi No.3 Middle School
- Changzhi No.4 Middle School
- Changzhi No.5 Middle School
- Changzhi No.6 Middle School
- Changzhi No.7 Middle School
- Changzhi No.8 Middle School
- Changzhi No.9 Middle School
- Changzhi No.10 Middle School
- Changzhi Experimental Middle School
- Changzhi No.12 Middle School
- Changzhi No.13 Middle School
- Changzhi No.14 Middle School
- Changzhi No.15 Middle School
- Changzhi No.16 Middle School
- Changzhi No.17 Middle School
- Changzhi No.18 Middle School
- Changzhi No.19 Middle School
- Tai-Hang Middle School (Subsidiary Middle School of Changzhi College)

== Transportation ==
=== Expressways ===
Portions of three National Highways run through Changzhi: China National Highway 207, China National Highway 208, and China National Highway 309. National Highways 207 and 208 run along a north–south axis, while National Highway 309 runs along a west–east axis.

Other major expressways which run through Changzhi include the Changzhi-Handan Expressway, and expressways which link the city to Handan, Jincheng, and Taiyuan. The Changzhi-Linfen Expressway also runs through the city.

=== Railway ===
- Taiyuan–Jiaozuo high-speed railway
- Taiyuan–Jiaozuo Railway
- Handan–Changzhi Railway

=== Airport ===
- Changzhi Wangcun Airport Changzhi Wangcun Airport is a civil-military airport located 7.5 kilometers north of Changzhi City, Shanxi Province, China, and is operated and managed by Shanxi Civil Aviation Airport Group. It is an important aviation port in Shanxi Province and a national second-class civil aviation airport. It plays a very prominent role in the great practice of transformation and leapfrog development of the city and even the province.

== Notable people ==
- Faxian (334–420), a native of Wuyang, Pingyang County, Sizhou, Eastern Jin Dynasty (now Linfen area, Shanxi Province), was a famous monk in the history of Chinese Buddhism, an outstanding Buddhist reformer, the first Chinese master to go overseas to seek Buddhist scriptures and Dharma, and an outstanding traveler and translator.
- Li Yueru, WNBA center for the Dallas Wings
