= Shangdang District =

Shangdang 上党区
- District
- Location of the seat in Shanxi
- Country: People's Republic of China
- Province: Shanxi
- Prefecture-level city: Changzhi
- Time zone: UTC+8 (China Standard)

Shangdang District (Chinese: 上党区; pinyin: Shàngdǎng Qū), formerly Changzhi County (simplified Chinese: 长治县; traditional Chinese: 長治縣; pinyin: Chángzhì Xiàn), is a district in southeastern Shanxi province, China. It is under the administration of Changzhi city, and is located in southern Changzhi.
