= Xiangyuan County =

Coordinates: 36°32′06″N 113°03′05″E

Xiangyuan County 襄垣县 Siangyuan; Siangyüan
- County
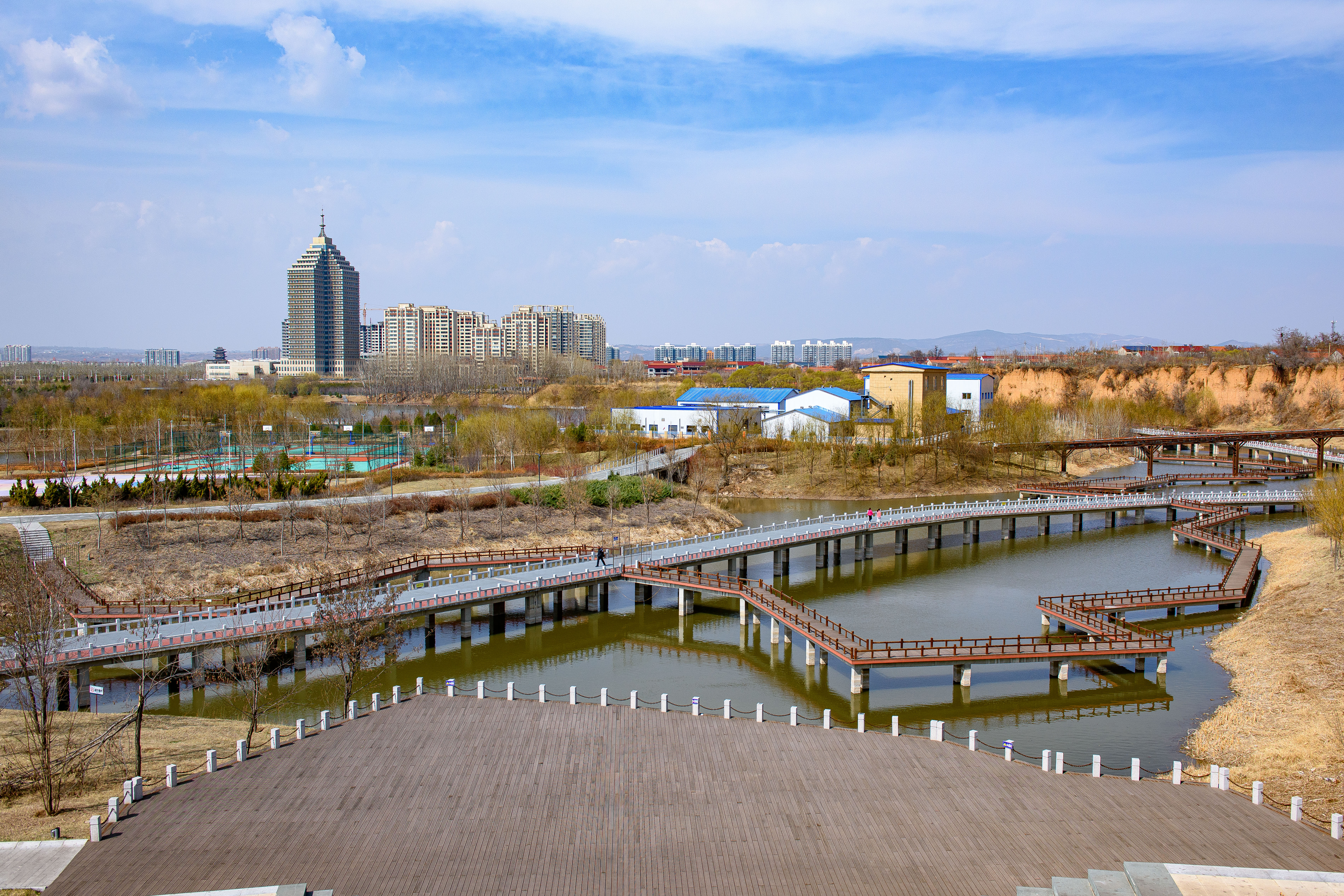

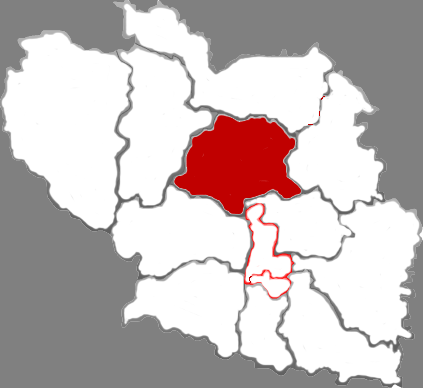
- Xiangyuan in Changzhi

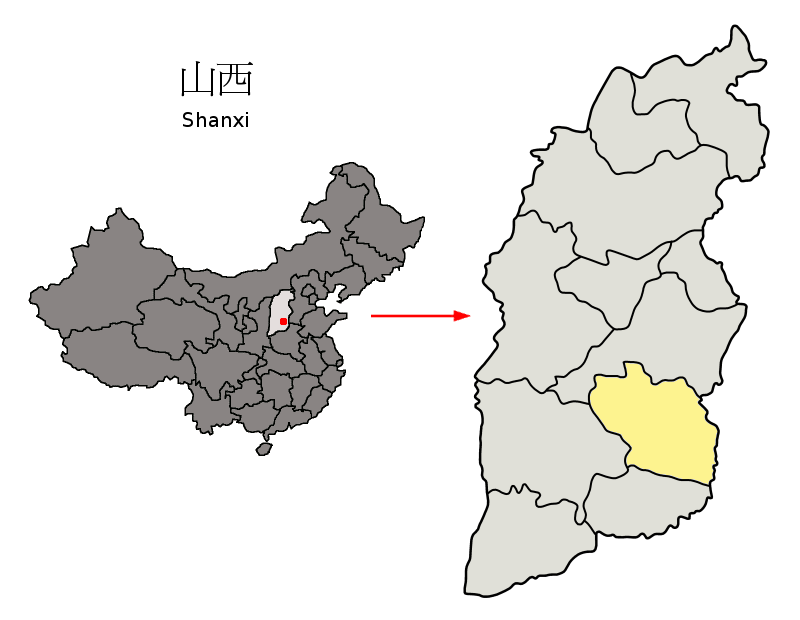
- Changzhi in Shanxi
- Country: People's Republic of China
- Province: Shanxi
- Prefecture-level city: Changzhi

Area
  - Total: 1,167 km^{2} (451 sq mi)

Population (2020)
  - Total: 260,081
  - Density: 222.9/km^{2} (577.2/sq mi)
- Time zone: UTC+8 (China Standard)

Xiangyuan County (Chinese: 襄垣县; pinyin: Xiāngyuán Xiàn) is a county in the southeast of Shanxi province, China. It is under the administration of the prefecture-level city of Changzhi. It is between 112 ° 42 ′ - 113 ° 14 ′ E and 36 ° 23 ′ - 36 ° 44 ′ n with a total area of 1178 square kilometers.

== Climate ==
Climate data for Xiangyuan, elevation 878 m (2,881 ft), (1991–2020 normals, extremes 1981–2010)
Month	Jan	Feb	Mar	Apr	May	Jun	Jul	Aug	Sep	Oct	Nov	Dec	Year
Record high °C (°F)	15.5 (59.9)	22.9 (73.2)	29.1 (84.4)	36.2 (97.2)	36.5 (97.7)	39.1 (102.4)	37.3 (99.1)	34.4 (93.9)	36.3 (97.3)	30.0 (86.0)	25.0 (77.0)	18.2 (64.8)	39.1 (102.4)
Mean daily maximum °C (°F)	3.2 (37.8)	6.9 (44.4)	13.1 (55.6)	20.2 (68.4)	25.3 (77.5)	28.8 (83.8)	29.5 (85.1)	27.9 (82.2)	23.7 (74.7)	18.2 (64.8)	10.9 (51.6)	4.5 (40.1)	17.7 (63.8)
Daily mean °C (°F)	−5.3 (22.5)	−1.4 (29.5)	5.0 (41.0)	12.1 (53.8)	17.8 (64.0)	21.7 (71.1)	23.4 (74.1)	21.9 (71.4)	16.8 (62.2)	10.4 (50.7)	2.8 (37.0)	−3.6 (25.5)	10.1 (50.2)
Mean daily minimum °C (°F)	−11.7 (10.9)	−7.8 (18.0)	−2.0 (28.4)	4.4 (39.9)	10.1 (50.2)	14.8 (58.6)	18.4 (65.1)	17.1 (62.8)	11.2 (52.2)	4.1 (39.4)	−3.1 (26.4)	−9.4 (15.1)	3.8 (38.9)
Record low °C (°F)	−24.5 (−12.1)	−24.6 (−12.3)	−16.7 (1.9)	−8.6 (16.5)	−2.4 (27.7)	4.4 (39.9)	9.8 (49.6)	8.1 (46.6)	−1.5 (29.3)	−8.1 (17.4)	−22.6 (−8.7)	−27.4 (−17.3)	−27.4 (−17.3)
Average precipitation mm (inches)	3.4 (0.13)	6.9 (0.27)	9.8 (0.39)	28.6 (1.13)	43.9 (1.73)	62.3 (2.45)	132.6 (5.22)	103.4 (4.07)	58.6 (2.31)	35.3 (1.39)	16.6 (0.65)	3.0 (0.12)	504.4 (19.86)
Average precipitation days (≥ 0.1 mm)	2.7	3.4	4.1	6.2	6.9	10.4	12.8	11.6	9.0	6.4	4.6	2.5	80.6
Average snowy days	3.9	4.5	2.7	0.7	0	0	0	0	0	0	2.4	3.6	17.8
Average relative humidity (%)	56	54	51	52	55	61	74	77	74	70	65	59	62
Mean monthly sunshine hours	171.3	169.7	206.1	234.2	255.6	221.3	206.4	202.2	174.0	180.7	170.6	172.2	2,364.3
Percentage possible sunshine	55	55	55	59	58	51	47	49	47	52	56	58	54
Source: China Meteorological Administration
