= Zhangzi County =

Coordinates: 36°07′26″N 112°52′37″E

Zhangzi County 长子县 Changtze
- County
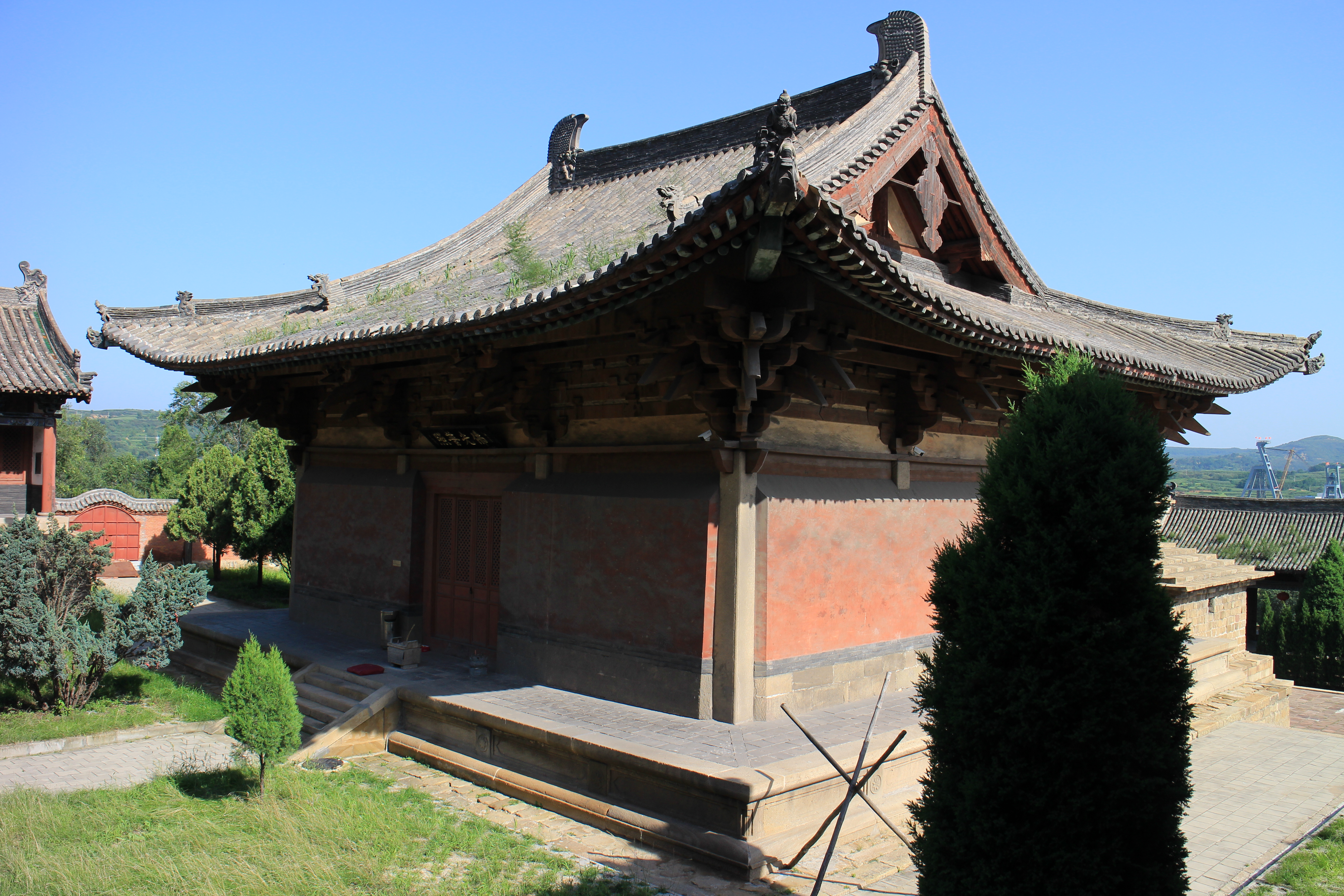
- Faxing Temple

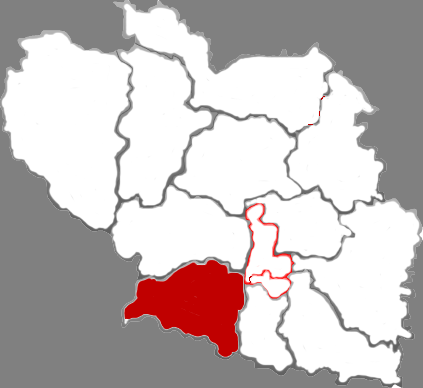

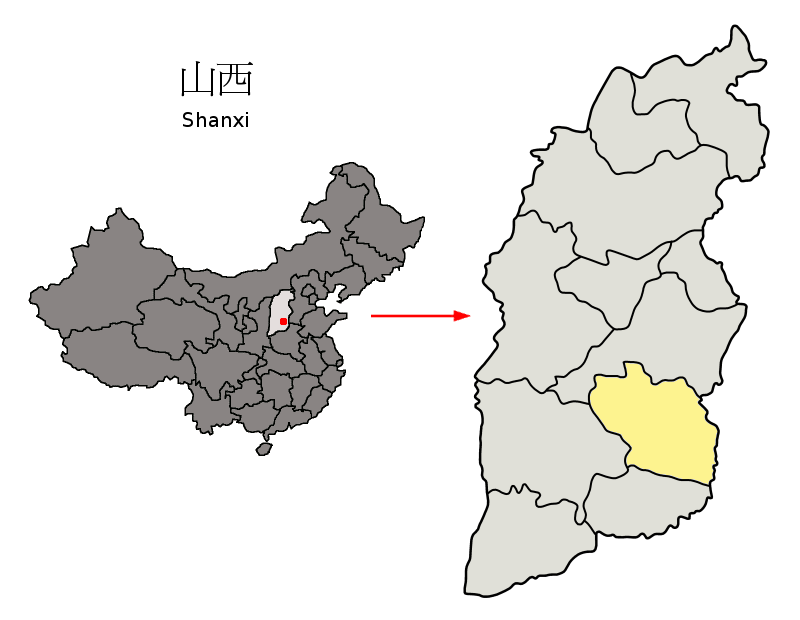
- Country: People's Republic of China
- Province: Shanxi
- Prefecture-level city: Changzhi

Population (2020)
  - Total: 298,690
- Time zone: UTC+8 (China Standard)
- Website: Zhangzi.gov.cn

Zhangzi County (simplified Chinese: 长子县; traditional Chinese: 長子縣; pinyin: Zhǎngzǐ Xiàn) is a county in the southeast of Shanxi province, China. It is under the administration of the prefecture-level city of Changzhi.

== Climate ==
Climate data for Zhangzhi, elevation 951 m (3,120 ft), (1991–2020 normals, extremes 1981–2010)
Month	Jan	Feb	Mar	Apr	May	Jun	Jul	Aug	Sep	Oct	Nov	Dec	Year
Record high °C (°F)	16.6 (61.9)	23.0 (73.4)	27.9 (82.2)	35.2 (95.4)	37.0 (98.6)	37.4 (99.3)	36.9 (98.4)	34.6 (94.3)	35.6 (96.1)	30.5 (86.9)	25.3 (77.5)	18.5 (65.3)	37.4 (99.3)
Mean daily maximum °C (°F)	2.6 (36.7)	6.4 (43.5)	12.6 (54.7)	19.7 (67.5)	24.8 (76.6)	28.2 (82.8)	28.6 (83.5)	27.2 (81.0)	23.2 (73.8)	17.8 (64.0)	10.6 (51.1)	4.1 (39.4)	17.2 (62.9)
Daily mean °C (°F)	−4.7 (23.5)	−1.0 (30.2)	5.1 (41.2)	12.2 (54.0)	17.7 (63.9)	21.4 (70.5)	22.8 (73.0)	21.3 (70.3)	16.5 (61.7)	10.5 (50.9)	3.4 (38.1)	−2.9 (26.8)	10.2 (50.3)
Mean daily minimum °C (°F)	−10.4 (13.3)	−6.5 (20.3)	−1.0 (30.2)	5.4 (41.7)	10.9 (51.6)	15.1 (59.2)	18.1 (64.6)	16.8 (62.2)	11.3 (52.3)	4.9 (40.8)	−2.0 (28.4)	−8.1 (17.4)	4.5 (40.2)
Record low °C (°F)	−24.1 (−11.4)	−22.8 (−9.0)	−13.5 (7.7)	−5.7 (21.7)	−0.1 (31.8)	6.8 (44.2)	11.5 (52.7)	8.5 (47.3)	0.1 (32.2)	−6.7 (19.9)	−20.0 (−4.0)	−23.9 (−11.0)	−24.1 (−11.4)
Average precipitation mm (inches)	5.8 (0.23)	10.1 (0.40)	12.3 (0.48)	32.9 (1.30)	59.0 (2.32)	67.1 (2.64)	137.4 (5.41)	94.8 (3.73)	67.1 (2.64)	37.2 (1.46)	19.3 (0.76)	4.8 (0.19)	547.8 (21.56)
Average precipitation days (≥ 0.1 mm)	3.3	4.0	4.3	6.1	8.2	10.4	12.9	11.3	9.1	7.1	5.0	2.7	84.4
Average snowy days	4.3	4.9	2.7	0.7	0	0	0	0	0	0.1	2.4	3.9	19
Average relative humidity (%)	58	58	53	53	55	63	78	80	76	68	63	58	64
Mean monthly sunshine hours	164.3	165.4	194.3	219.7	240.9	215.5	196.7	186.9	164.1	173.8	167.8	168.6	2,258
Percentage possible sunshine	53	53	52	56	55	49	45	45	45	50	55	56	51
Source: China Meteorological Administration
