= Lucheng District, Changzhi =

Lucheng 潞城区
- District
- Location in Shanxi
- Coordinates: 36°19′N 113°13′E
- Country: People's Republic of China
- Province: Shanxi
- Prefecture-level city: Changzhi
- Time zone: UTC+8 (China Standard)

Lucheng (Chinese: 潞城; pinyin: Lùchéng) is a District in Changzhi, in south-eastern Shanxi province of the People's Republic of China. As a division of Changzhi City, it covers an area of 615 km² and has a population of 210,000. Lucheng's economy is driven by coal industry and limestone mining.

A village in Lucheng county, Zhangzhuangcun (张庄村, pinyin: Zhāngzhuāngcūn), sometimes translated as Long Bow Village, was made famous by the book Fanshen written by William H. Hinton. The book chronicles the changes Zhangzhuangcun underwent after the defeat of occupying Japanese forces by the communist Eighth Route Army and the ensuing land reform movement by the Chinese Communist Party during second Chinese civil war. Hinton documented his return to Zhangzhuangcun years later in Shenfan, chronicling what had happened in the years since and describing how the Cultural Revolution affected the village.

== History ==
- In 1994, its title changed from Lucheng County to Lucheng City (a county-level city under the administration of Changzhi) with approval by the State Council.
- In 2018, its title changed to Lucheng District.

== Climate ==
Climate data for Lucheng, elevation 948 m (3,110 ft), (1991–2020 normals, extremes 1981–2010)
Month	Jan	Feb	Mar	Apr	May	Jun	Jul	Aug	Sep	Oct	Nov	Dec	Year
Record high °C (°F)	16.2 (61.2)	22.3 (72.1)	28.5 (83.3)	34.9 (94.8)	36.4 (97.5)	37.6 (99.7)	37.5 (99.5)	34.9 (94.8)	35.3 (95.5)	29.7 (85.5)	24.1 (75.4)	19.0 (66.2)	37.6 (99.7)
Mean daily maximum °C (°F)	2.5 (36.5)	6.2 (43.2)	12.4 (54.3)	19.5 (67.1)	24.6 (76.3)	28.2 (82.8)	28.7 (83.7)	27.1 (80.8)	23.0 (73.4)	17.6 (63.7)	10.3 (50.5)	3.9 (39.0)	17.0 (62.6)
Daily mean °C (°F)	−4.8 (23.4)	−1.2 (29.8)	4.9 (40.8)	12.1 (53.8)	17.7 (63.9)	21.5 (70.7)	22.9 (73.2)	21.4 (70.5)	16.5 (61.7)	10.3 (50.5)	3.2 (37.8)	−2.9 (26.8)	10.1 (50.2)
Mean daily minimum °C (°F)	−10.1 (13.8)	−6.7 (19.9)	−1.2 (29.8)	5.1 (41.2)	10.7 (51.3)	15.2 (59.4)	18.1 (64.6)	16.9 (62.4)	11.3 (52.3)	4.7 (40.5)	−2.0 (28.4)	−7.8 (18.0)	4.5 (40.1)
Record low °C (°F)	−23.3 (−9.9)	−20.5 (−4.9)	−14.6 (5.7)	−6.8 (19.8)	−0.4 (31.3)	6.5 (43.7)	10.7 (51.3)	8.4 (47.1)	0.2 (32.4)	−6.8 (19.8)	−18.9 (−2.0)	−23.0 (−9.4)	−23.3 (−9.9)
Average precipitation mm (inches)	4.5 (0.18)	9.4 (0.37)	11.0 (0.43)	33.5 (1.32)	47.5 (1.87)	66.9 (2.63)	140.6 (5.54)	103.8 (4.09)	59.6 (2.35)	35.7 (1.41)	19.3 (0.76)	4.4 (0.17)	536.2 (21.12)
Average precipitation days (≥ 0.1 mm)	3.4	4.2	4.6	6.4	7.9	10.6	14.1	11.5	9.3	6.8	4.9	2.9	86.6
Average snowy days	4.7	5.0	3.4	0.8	0	0	0	0	0	0.1	2.8	4.0	20.8
Average relative humidity (%)	55	54	50	51	54	61	76	79	75	68	63	56	62
Mean monthly sunshine hours	151.4	150.7	181.3	209.4	228.8	194.9	177.3	173.0	155.0	163.0	157.3	152.5	2,094.6
Percentage possible sunshine	49	49	49	53	52	45	40	42	42	47	52	51	48
Source: China Meteorological Administration

== Transportation ==
- China National Highway 207
