= Tunliu District =

Coordinates: 36°18′55″N 112°53′30″E

Tunliu 屯留区
- District
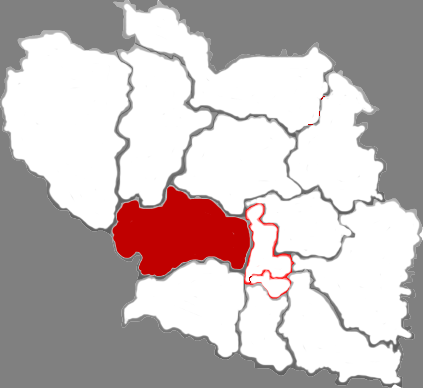
- Tunliu in Changzhi

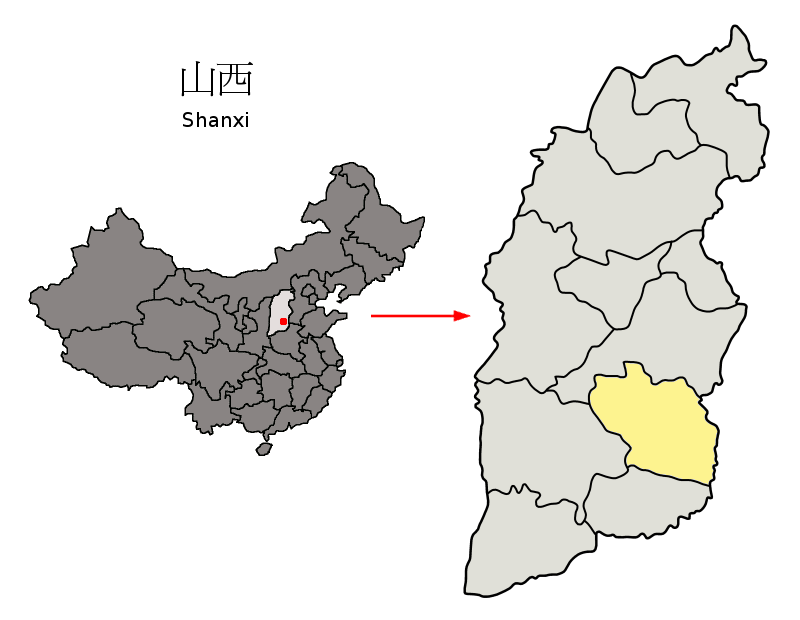
- Changzhi in Shanxi
- Country: People's Republic of China
- Province: Shanxi
- Prefecture-level city: Changzhi
- Time zone: UTC+8 (China Standard)

Tunliu (Chinese: 屯留; pinyin: Túnliú) is a district of the city of Changzhi, Shanxi province, China. Lord Chang'an, Chengjiao, brother of Qin Shi Huang, died here.

== Climate ==
Climate data for Tunliu, elevation 952 m (3,123 ft), (1991–2020 normals, extremes 1981–present)
Month	Jan	Feb	Mar	Apr	May	Jun	Jul	Aug	Sep	Oct	Nov	Dec	Year
Record high °C (°F)	16.3 (61.3)	22.9 (73.2)	29.0 (84.2)	34.8 (94.6)	37.1 (98.8)	39.5 (103.1)	36.4 (97.5)	35.2 (95.4)	35.9 (96.6)	29.7 (85.5)	24.6 (76.3)	17.8 (64.0)	39.5 (103.1)
Mean daily maximum °C (°F)	2.8 (37.0)	6.4 (43.5)	12.7 (54.9)	19.8 (67.6)	24.9 (76.8)	28.4 (83.1)	29.0 (84.2)	27.5 (81.5)	23.3 (73.9)	17.9 (64.2)	10.5 (50.9)	4.2 (39.6)	17.3 (63.1)
Daily mean °C (°F)	−4.2 (24.4)	−0.7 (30.7)	5.3 (41.5)	12.3 (54.1)	17.9 (64.2)	21.7 (71.1)	23.1 (73.6)	21.7 (71.1)	16.9 (62.4)	10.8 (51.4)	3.7 (38.7)	−2.5 (27.5)	10.5 (50.9)
Mean daily minimum °C (°F)	−9.8 (14.4)	−6.2 (20.8)	−0.8 (30.6)	5.6 (42.1)	11.2 (52.2)	15.6 (60.1)	18.4 (65.1)	17.3 (63.1)	11.9 (53.4)	5.3 (41.5)	−1.7 (28.9)	−7.6 (18.3)	4.9 (40.9)
Record low °C (°F)	−24.2 (−11.6)	−22.5 (−8.5)	−12.7 (9.1)	−6.4 (20.5)	0.9 (33.6)	7.2 (45.0)	11.5 (52.7)	9.2 (48.6)	1.0 (33.8)	−5.6 (21.9)	−18.4 (−1.1)	−23.3 (−9.9)	−24.2 (−11.6)
Average precipitation mm (inches)	4.9 (0.19)	8.4 (0.33)	11.0 (0.43)	30.8 (1.21)	48.7 (1.92)	63.8 (2.51)	140.5 (5.53)	100.1 (3.94)	67.4 (2.65)	37.0 (1.46)	18.1 (0.71)	3.8 (0.15)	534.5 (21.03)
Average precipitation days (≥ 0.1 mm)	3.1	3.8	4.2	5.9	7.6	10.1	12.8	10.9	9.2	6.4	4.6	2.7	81.3
Average snowy days	4.2	4.8	2.9	0.6	0	0	0	0	0	0.1	2.3	3.9	18.8
Average relative humidity (%)	53	54	50	51	53	61	76	77	74	66	61	54	61
Mean monthly sunshine hours	154.7	161.4	192.3	219.9	240.9	215.1	194.5	186.5	165.3	174.7	165.9	159.2	2,230.4
Percentage possible sunshine	50	52	51	56	55	49	44	45	45	51	55	53	51
Source: China Meteorological Administrationall-time February high
