= Qin Jianxiao =

Chinese politician

- 秦建孝

Communist Party Secretary of Zezhou County
- In office March 2014 – November 2014
- Preceded by: Cui Shou'an
- Succeeded by: Zhao Xinnian

Communist Party Secretary of Qinshui County
- In office May 2011 – March 2014
- Preceded by: Chang Guorong
- Succeeded by: Fan Zhaosen

Mayor of Gaoping
- In office April 2011 – May 2011
- Preceded by: Xie Kemin
- Succeeded by: Yang Xiaobo

Personal details
- Born: November 1962 (age 63) Huguan County, Shanxi, China
- Party: Chinese Communist Party (expelled)

Qin Jianxiao (Chinese: 秦建孝; pinyin: Qín Jiànxiào; born November 1962) is a former Chinese politician from Shanxi. During his career he has served as the mayor of Gaoping, the Chinese Communist Party Committee Secretary of Qinshui County, and the CCP Committee Secretary of Zezhou County. In September 2014, Qin was placed under investigation by the Central Commission for Discipline Inspection; he was removed from office and expelled from the Chinese Communist Party (CCP) in November 2014.

== Life and career ==
Qin was born and raised in Huguan County, Shanxi, under the jurisdiction of Changzhi.

He began his political career in September 1982. He spent three years teaching at Jindongnan Radio and TV University before serving in various roles in the Organization Department of Jincheng Municipal CCP Committee.

In October 1996 he became the deputy County Governor of Zezhou County, a position he held until April 2003, when he was appointed the Secretary of Zezhou County Political and Legal Affairs Commission (Zhengfawei).

He was transferred to Gaoping in December 2003, and served as president of Gaoping Municipal Trade Union, Secretary of the Gaoping Municipal Discipline Inspection Commission, and a municipal Party Standing Committee member. From September 2006 to December 2009, he served as the CCP Committee Secretary and Director of Jincheng Municipal Agriculture Bureau.

In December 2009, he was named acting Mayor of Gaoping, at the same time holding the post of vice mayor and deputy party chief, he was promoted to become the mayor in April 2011. In May 2011, he was appointed the CCP Committee Secretary of Qinshui County, he remained in that position until March 2014, when he was transferred to Zezhou County and appointed the CCP Committee Secretary.

== Downfall ==
On September 25, 2014, he was being investigated by the Central Commission for Discipline Inspection for "serious violations of laws and regulations". In November 2014, he was removed from office and expelled from the party. His case has been moved to judicial organs for criminal proceedings.

Government offices
Preceded by Xie Kemin	Mayor of Gaoping; 2009–2011	Succeeded by Yang Xiaobo
Party political offices
Preceded by Chang Guorong	Communist Party Secretary of Qinshui County; 2011–2014	Succeeded by Fan Zhaosen
Preceded by Cui Shou'an	Communist Party Secretary of Zezhou County; 2014–2014	Succeeded by Zhao Xinnian
