= Yang Xiaobo =

Yang Xiaobo, may refer to:

- Yang Xiaobo (Hubei politician) (1963–2020), Chinese politician, Mayor of Huangshi, Hubei
- Yang Xiaobo (Shanxi politician) (born 1971), Chinese politician, former mayor of Gaoping, Shanxi
