= CQJ =

CQJ can refer to:

- Microbiotheriidae, a family of marsupials, by Catalogue of Life identifier
- Chengqu, Jincheng, a district of Jincheng, Shanxi province, China
