= Yang Xiaobo (politician, born 1971) =

Chinese politician

- 杨晓波

Mayor of Gaoping
- In office June 2011 – June 2014
- Party Secretary: Xie Kemin (谢克敏)
- Preceded by: Xie Kemin
- Succeeded by: Zou Shuqi

Personal details
- Born: November 1971 (age 54) Yangcheng County, Shanxi, China
- Party: Chinese Communist Party (expelled in 2014)
- Education: Nankai University

Chinese name
- Traditional Chinese: 楊曉波
- Simplified Chinese: 杨晓波
Transcriptions
Standard Mandarin
- Hanyu Pinyin: Yáng Xiǎobō

Yang Xiaobo (Chinese: 杨晓波; born November 1971) is a former Chinese politician from Shanxi province who served as mayor of the county-level city of Gaoping. She was investigated by the Chinese Communist Party's Central Commission for Discipline Inspection in April 2014, then she was removed from office and expelled from the party in November 2014.

== Early life and education ==
Yang was born and raised in Yangcheng County, Shanxi. She graduated from Nankai University, majoring in economics, and in 1991 from the Southeastern Shanxi Normal College.

== Career ==
In 1991, Yang began to work in the Jincheng Mining Bureau. By 1995, she had been promoted to a leadership position in charge of cadre management. She served in various posts in the Organization Department of Jincheng Municipal Party Committee before becoming the Chinese Communist Party Deputy Committee Secretary of the Jincheng Communist Youth League organization.

From May 2006 to May 2011, she was the head of Propaganda Department of Jinchen Urban District.

In May 2011, she was named acting mayor of Gaoping, a county-level city under the jurisdiction of Jincheng. This move was considered extremely unusual as it was rare for an official to be transferred directly from a propaganda director position one level below to a mayor position of significant power. A mouth later, she was duly confirmed as mayor.

As mayor, she undertook a massive real estate development project with renowned Guangdong property developer Country Garden worth 2.6 billion yuan to "revitalize" the city. She was also known to have a testy relationship with then Gaoping party chief Xie Kemin. The two were said to both have "strong personalities" and often clashed. As the Shanxi political scene reverberated from a strong "earthquake" caused by the anti-corruption campaign under Xi Jinping, Xie was taken in for investigation on March 6, 2014.

=== Corruption allegations ===
On April 30, 2014, Yang herself fell under the anti-corruption dragnet, when it was announced that she would undergo investigation by the Central Commission for Discipline Inspection for "serious violations of laws and regulations". She was the third consecutive mayor of Gaoping to be investigated for corruption in a decade. In November 2014, she was removed from office and expelled from the party for taking "advantage of her post to seek profits for others, accepted a huge amount of money and property; and adultery".

Government offices
Preceded by Xie Kemin	Mayor of Gaoping; 2011–2014	Succeeded by Zou Shuqi
