= Zezhou County =

Coordinates: 35°37′03″N 112°54′03″E

Zezhou County 泽州县 Tsehchow
- County
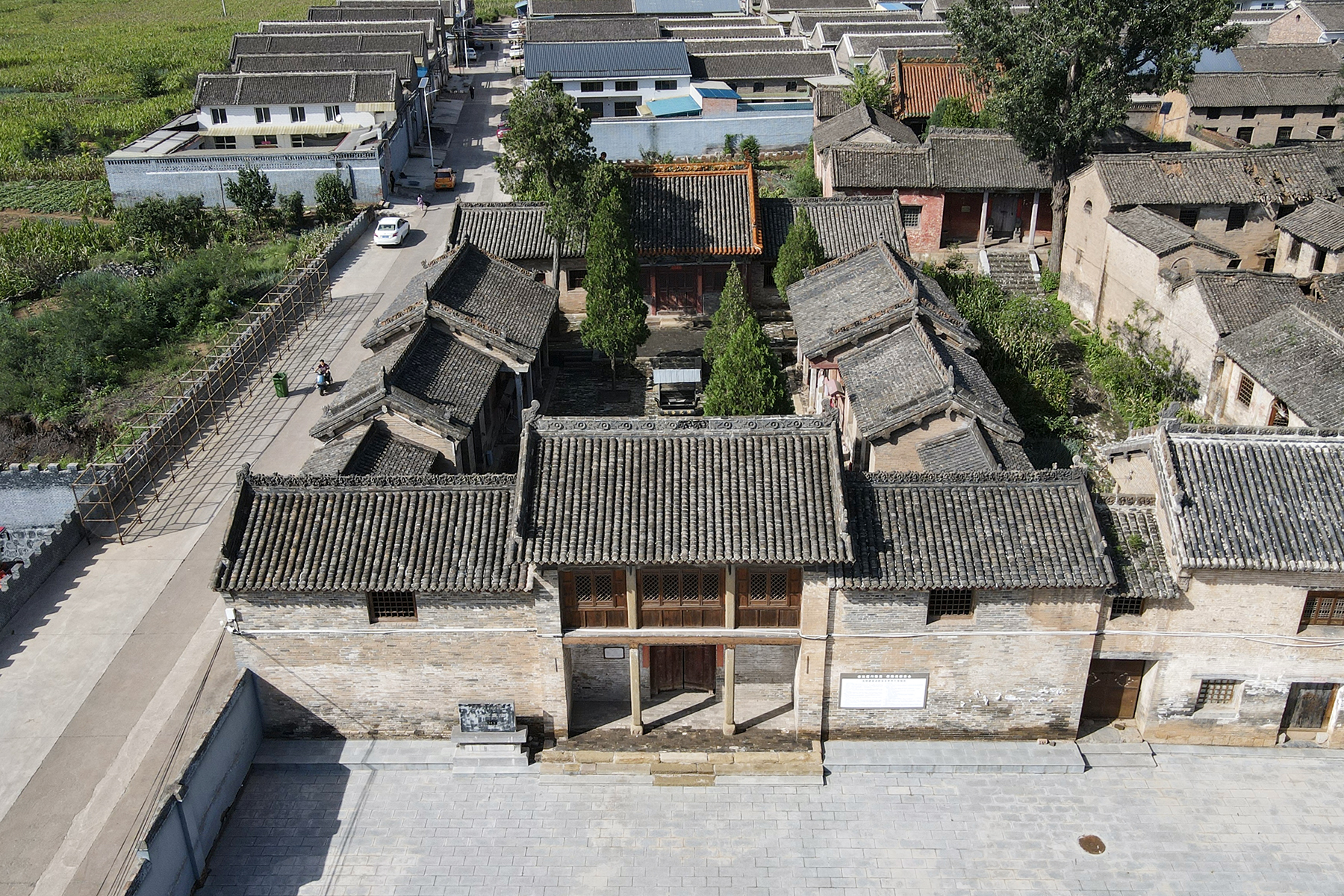
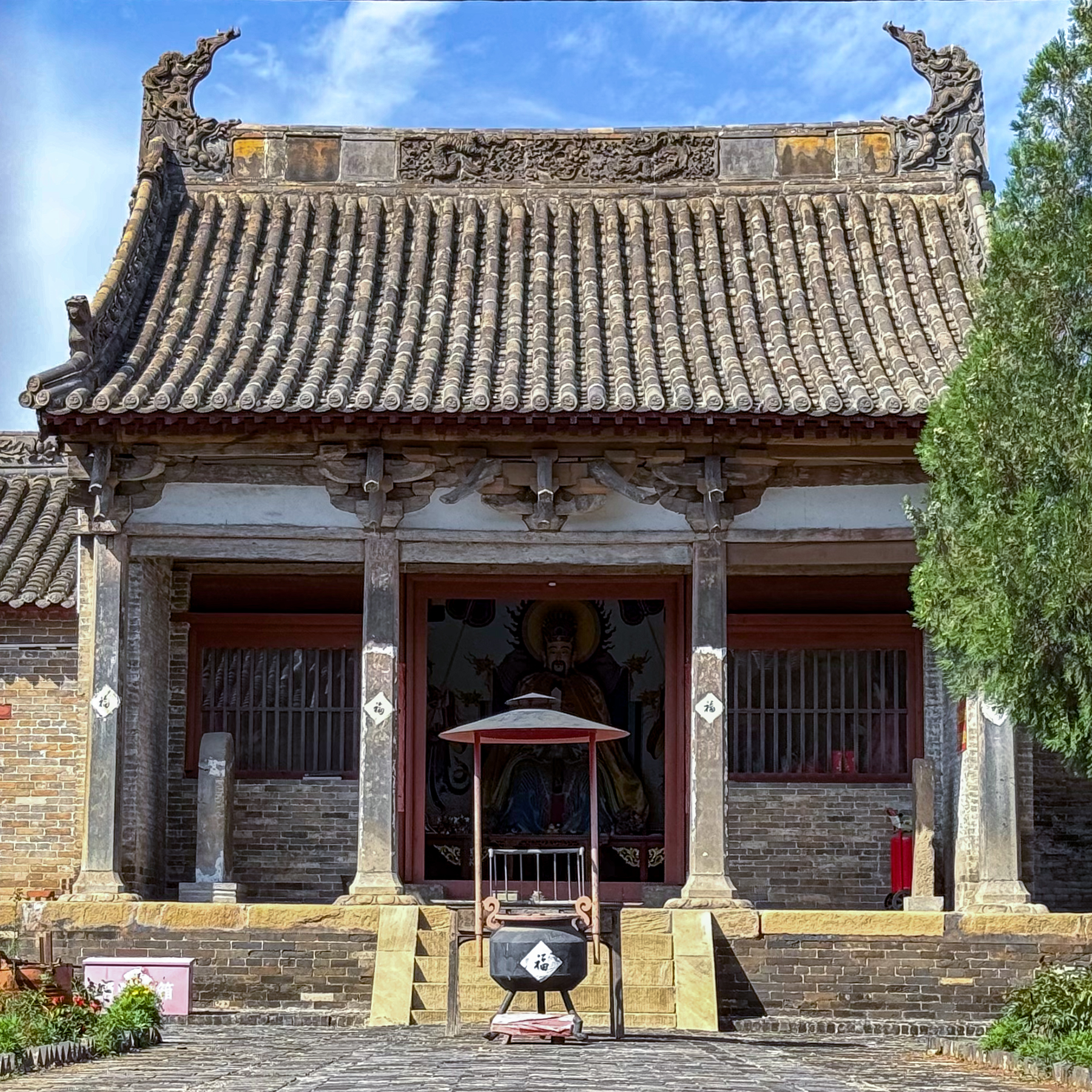
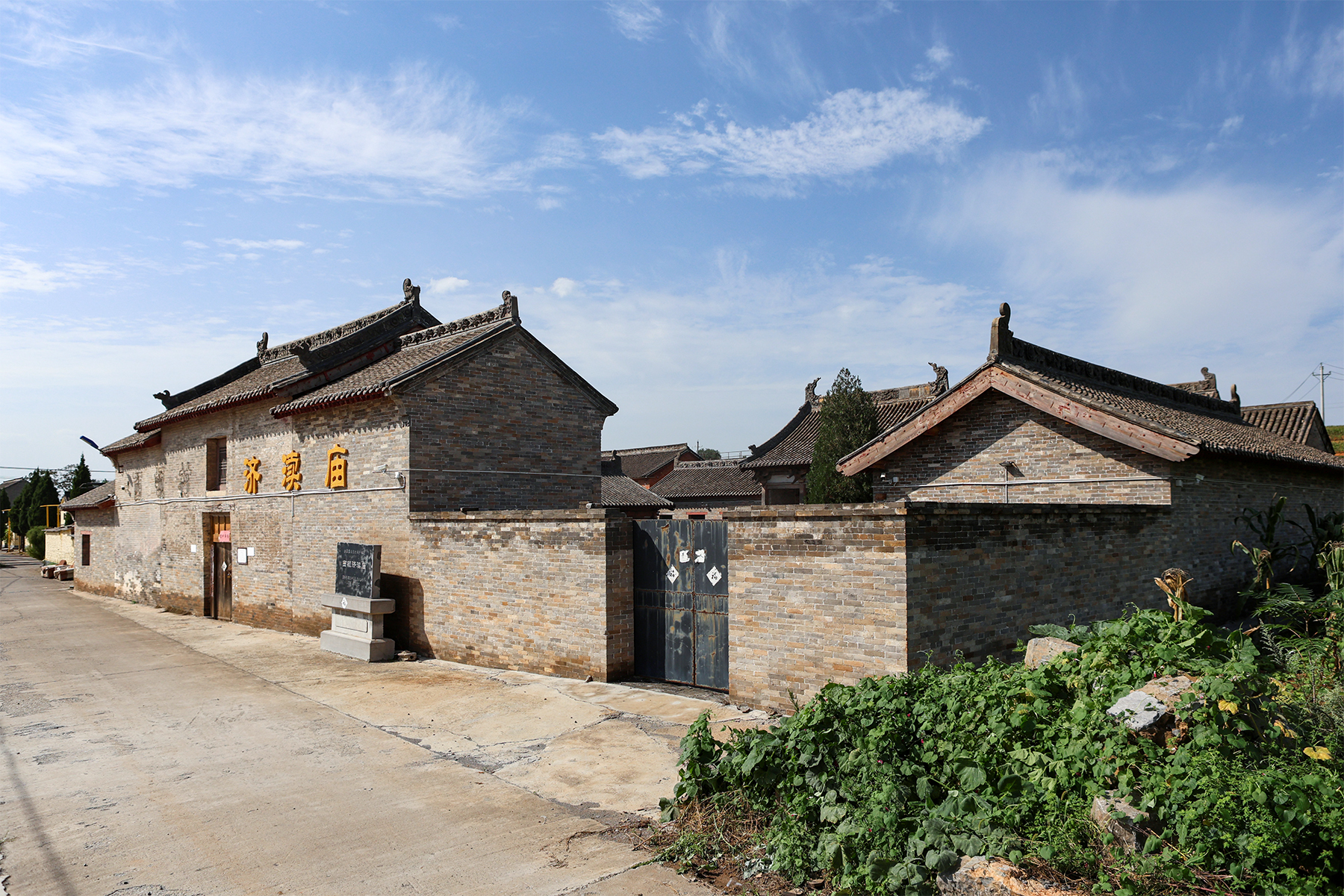
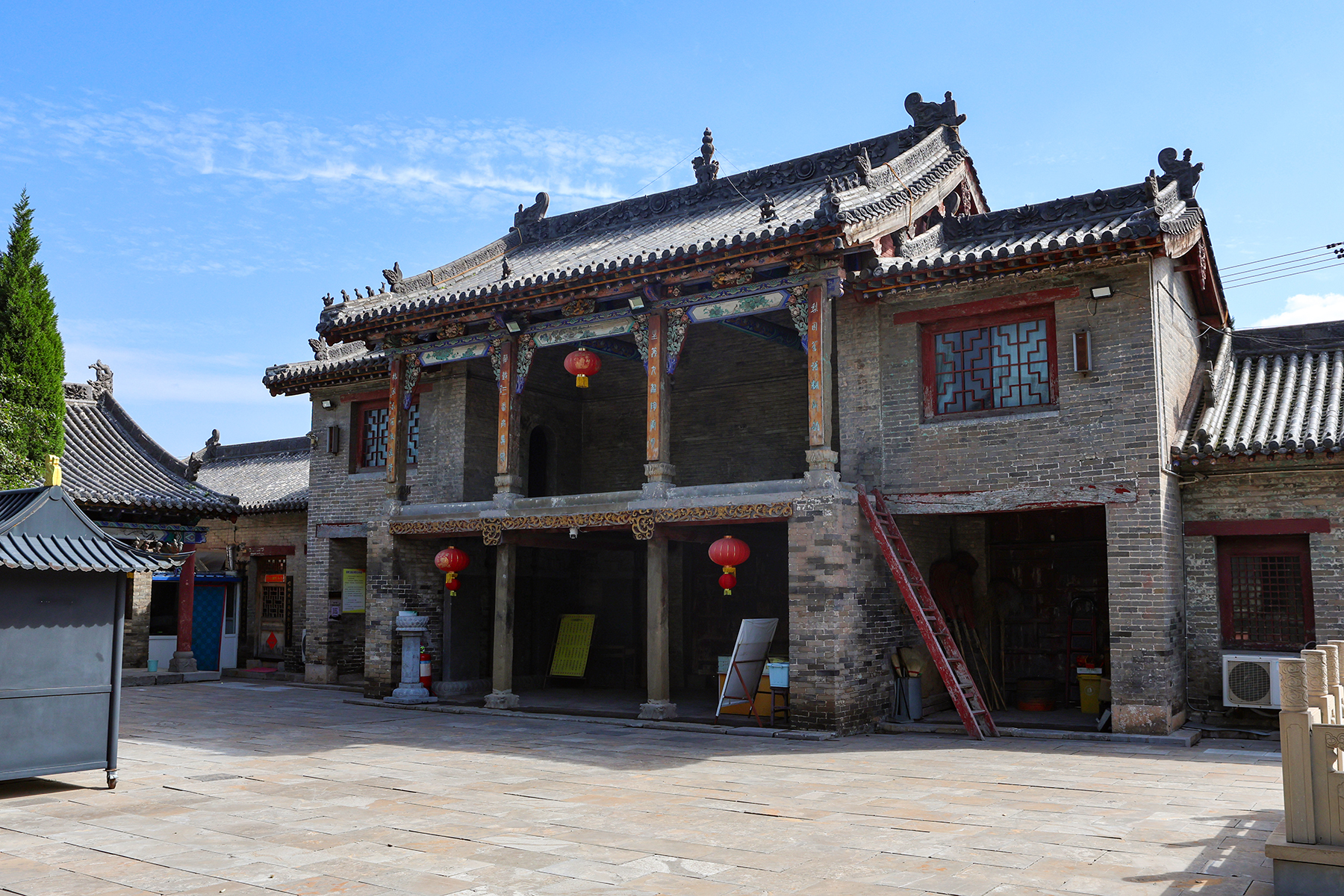
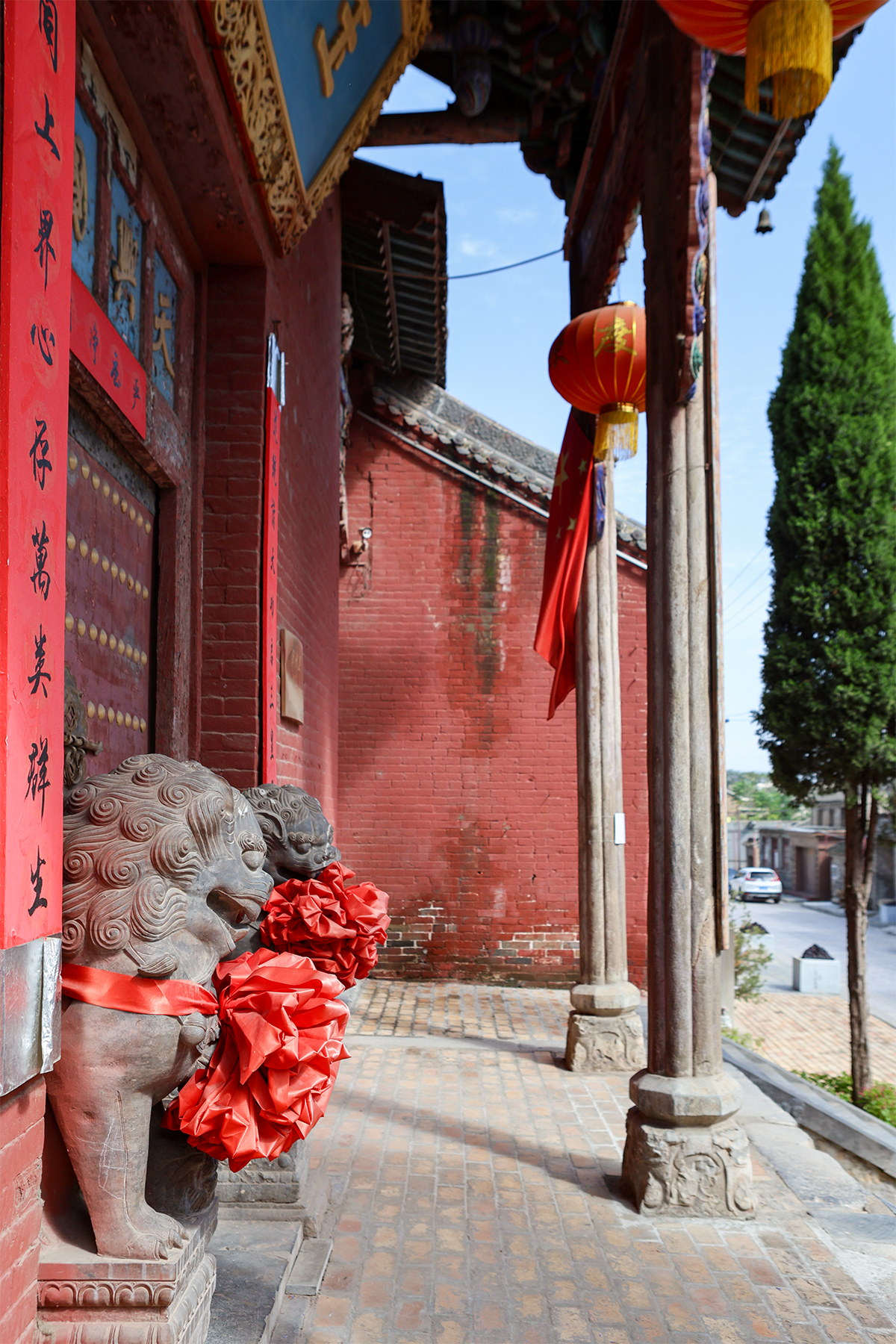
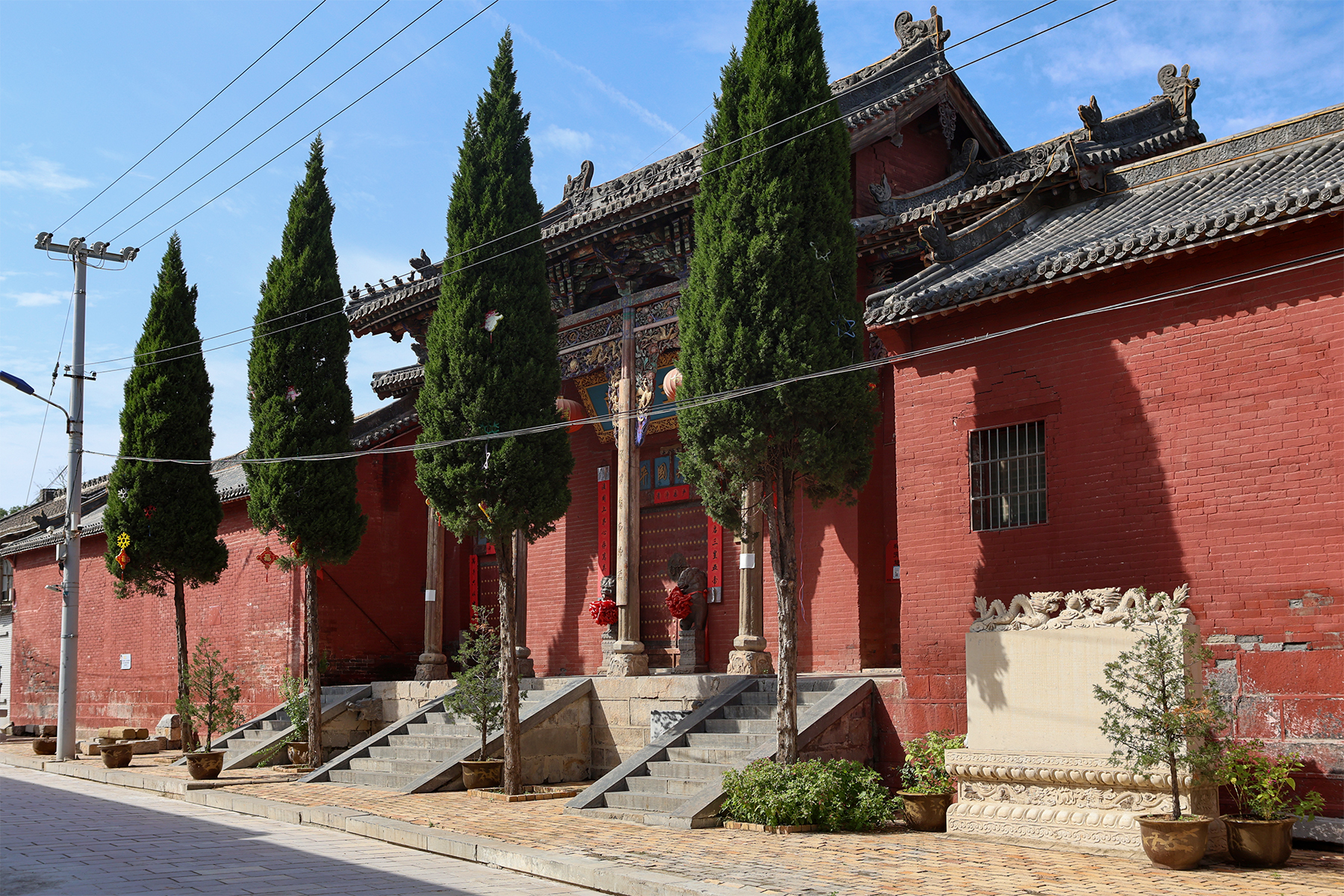
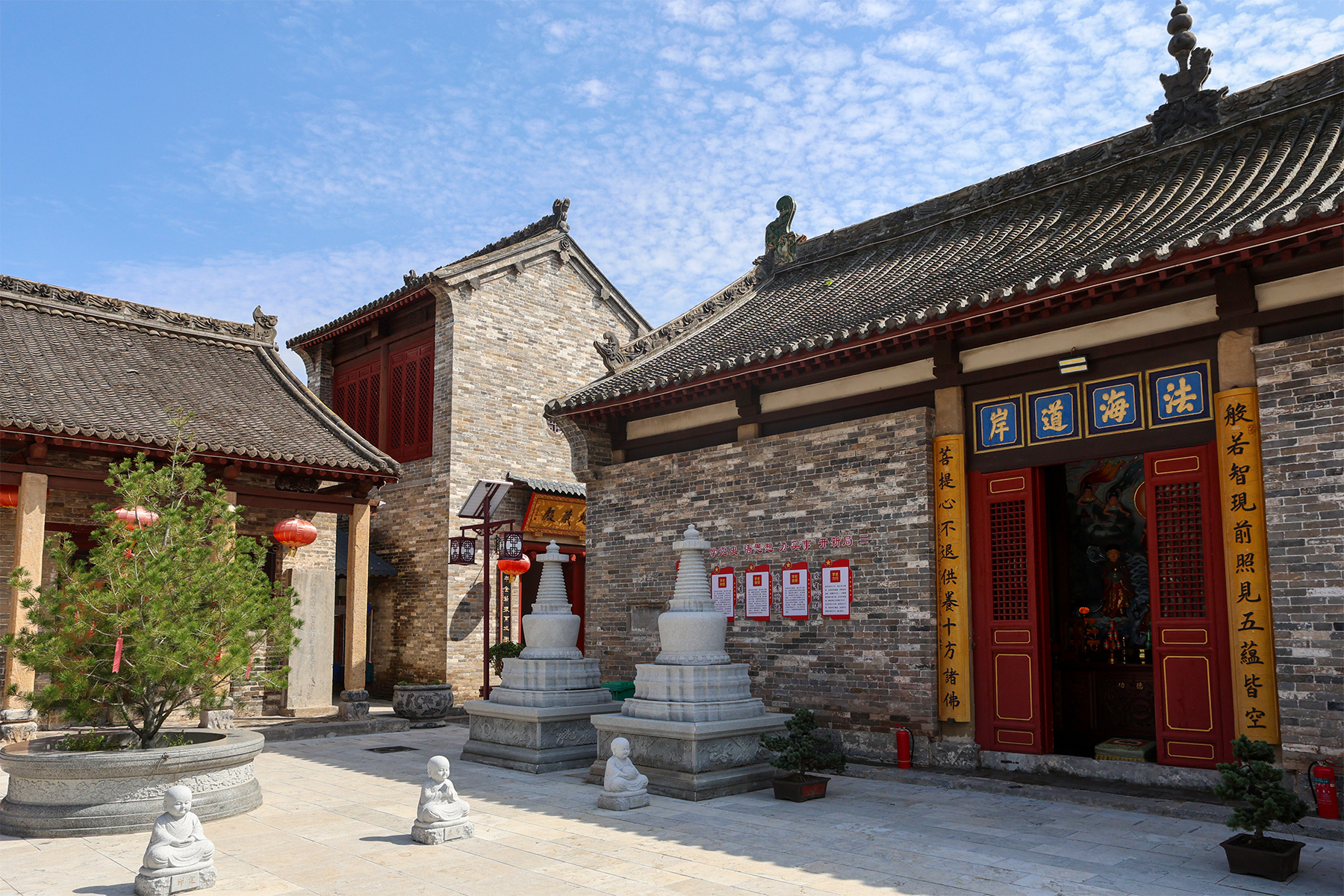

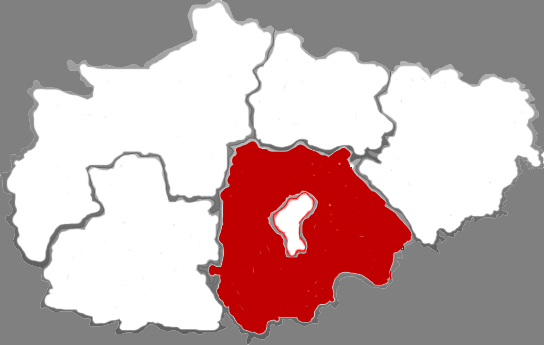
- Zezhou in Jincheng

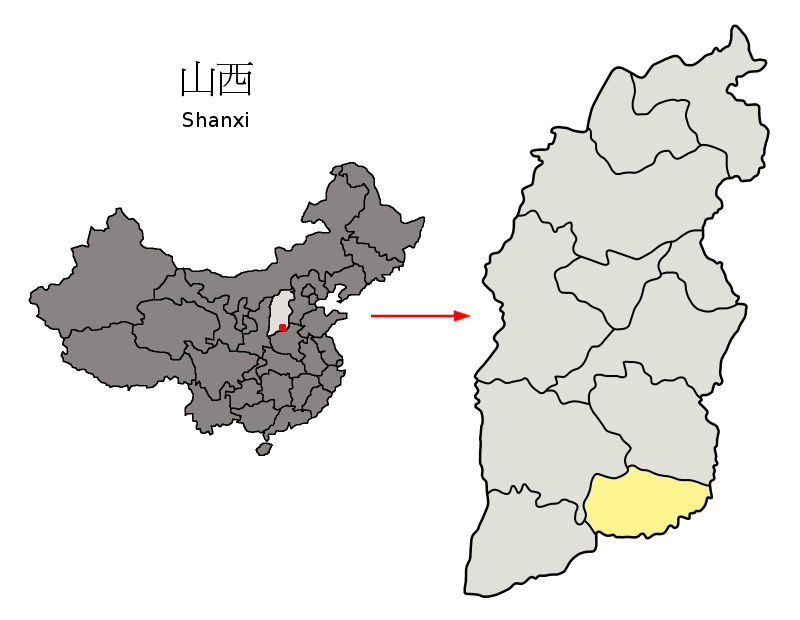
- Jincheng in Shanxi
- Country: People's Republic of China
- Province: Shanxi
- Prefecture-level city: Jincheng

Population (2010)
  - Total: 480,000
- Time zone: UTC+8 (China Standard)

Zezhou County (simplified Chinese: 泽州县; traditional Chinese: 澤州縣) is a county in the southeast of Shanxi province, China, bordering Henan province to the south. It is under the administration of the prefecture-level city of Jincheng, and surrounds the latter's central Chengqu, or urban area. Its population is approximately 480,000. The area under its jurisdiction was known as the "Suburban District" (Jiaoqu) of Jincheng, until it changed its name to Zezhou County in 1998. It is accessible via the G55 Erenhot–Guangzhou Expressway.
