= Responses to the COVID-19 pandemic in January 2020 =

Sequence of major events in a virus pandemic

This article documents the chronology of the response to the COVID-19 pandemic in January 2020, which originated in Wuhan, China in December 2019. Some developments may become known or fully understood only in retrospect. Reporting on this outbreak began in December 2019.

== Events, reactions, and measures in mainland China ==
=== 1 January ===
Huanan Seafood Wholesale Market, the source of the initial pneumonia cases, was closed on 1 January 2020 for cleaning and disinfection. On the same day, Chinese state news reported that Wuhan police interviewed eight residents for spreading "misinformation" referring to the new infection as another SARS and "exaggerating" the danger. However, CNA reported on the same date that Wuhan police said they had punished eight people for "publishing or forwarding false information on the internet without verification."

On 1 January 2020, a genetic sequencing company was notified by the Wuhan Municipal Health Committee that further sequencing of novel coronavirus samples were no longer allowed, existing samples must be destroyed and all data must be kept secret.

=== 2 January ===
On 2 January 2020, Central Hospital of Wuhan banned its staffs from discussing the disease publicly or recording them using text or image that can be used as evidence; situation of individual patients can only be mentioned verbally when doctors change shift.

=== 3 January ===
On 3 January 2020, China's National Health Committee Office published an announcement classifying the novel coronavirus as a highly pathogenic microorganisms (type 2), and request all the samples to be handed to provincial or higher level health authority, other organisation or person with the virus sample should either destroy or transfer them and keep the log, and emphasis that all data must be kept secret and prior approval from the authority will be needed before any results can be published.

=== 7 January ===
On 7 January 2020, General Secretary of the Chinese Communist Party Xi Jinping raised demand on the prevention and control of the pneumonia epidemic caused by novel coronavirus in Wuhan in a Politburo Standing Committee of the Chinese Communist Party meeting, according to article published by himself in February.

=== 10 January ===
The gene sequencing data of the isolated 2019-nCoV, a virus from the same family as the SARS coronavirus, was posted on Virological.org by researchers from Shanghai Public Health Clinical Center and Fudan University, Shanghai. A further three sequences from the Chinese Center for Disease Control and Prevention, one from the Chinese Academy of Medical Sciences, and one from Jinyintan Hospital in Wuhan were posted to the Global Initiative on Sharing All Influenza Data (GISAID) portal. The same day, Public Health England issued its guidance.

Beginning of the 2020 Chunyun travel season in China.

=== 12 January ===
Hubei's provincial representatives from all over the province met in Wuhan until 18 January.

Shanghai Public Health Clinical Center, the facility that published the first genome sequence of the virus, was closed without reason.

=== 14 January ===
Reporters from Hong Kong being taken to police station after trying to film situation within Wuhan hospital.

=== 15 January ===
Representative from Chinese government and American government sign the phase one trade deal over bilateral trade conflict in Washington D.C.

=== 20 January ===
China's National Health Commission announced confirmation that the coronavirus had begun to be transmitted between humans.

Chinese premier Li Keqiang urged decisive and effective efforts to prevent and control the epidemic. Beijing and Guangdong reported an additional three and thirteen laboratory-confirmed cases, respectively. Shanghai confirms its first case, bringing the total number of laboratory-confirmed cases in China to 218.

=== 22 January ===
The government announced a quarantine until further notice, cancelling outgoing flights and trains from Wuhan, and suspending public transportation in Wuhan, effective 10:00 (02:00 UTC, UTC+08:00) on 23 January. However, statistics compiled by the Chinese Railway Administration showed that on the same day approximately 100,000 people had already departed from Wuhan Train Station by the deadline. Furthermore, many Wuhan residents bypassed the checkpoints by taking antipyretics, having seen tips shared on Sina Weibo.

At the day's night, Wuhan government announced that citizens must wear face masks in public facilities.

=== 23 January ===
Wuhan suspended all public transportation from 10 a.m. onwards, including all bus, metro and ferry lines. Additionally, all outbound trains and flights were halted. In Wuhan, construction began near midnight for a specialist emergency hospital, modelled after the Xiaotangshan Hospital during the 2003 SARS outbreak in Beijing, after it was proposed earlier in the afternoon. The new Huoshenshan Hospital opened on 3 February with a capacity of at least 1,000 beds. The three provinces of Zhejiang, Guangdong, and Hunan declared a level 1 public health emergency (the highest possible) in chronological order. The release of all seven major films for the Lunar New Year was practically cancelled. In an example of black humor, Plague Inc., which was released in 2012, surged to become the most popular app in China.

=== 24 January ===
The seven provinces, two autonomous regions, and all four municipalities of Hubei, Anhui, Tianjin, Beijing, Shanghai, Chongqing, Sichuan, Jiangxi, Yunnan, Shandong, Fujian, Guangxi, and Hebei declared a level 1 public health emergency, in chronological order. The city of Jingzhou was quarantined, raising the number of people in quarantined cities to 35 million. The entire Hubei province now came under a city-by-city quarantine, save for Xiangyang and Shennongjia Forestry District.

All 70,000 Chinese cinemas were closed until further notice. Multiple tourist sites across China were closed until further notice, including Mount Wutai, Pingyao, Yanmen Pass, Xuanwu Lake, Qixia Mountain, Nanking Massacre Museum, Sun Yat-sen Memorial Hall, Canton Tower, Gulangyu, Yu Garden, Shanghai Disneyland, West Lake, and Forbidden City. Citing the coronavirus outbreak, Starbucks and McDonald's suspended some operations in China.

The Beijing and Shanghai governments have "urged residents returning from coronavirus outbreak areas to stay at home for 14 days to prevent its spread."

=== 25 January ===
A level 1 health emergency was declared in the 10 provinces and three autonomous regions of Jiangsu, Hainan, Xinjiang, Heilongjiang, Henan, Gansu, Liaoning, Shanxi, Shaanxi, Qinghai, Jilin, Ningxia, and Inner Mongolia, in chronological order. It is now in effect in all 30 of the 31 provincial-level divisions in mainland China with cases reported, the exception being Tibet.

China's National Health Commission had sent 1,230 medical staff in six groups to Wuhan City, central China's Hubei Province, to combat the novel coronavirus outbreak in the region. As of 25 January, three of the six groups began their work in the virus-hit area. Local media earlier reported that 450 military medical personnel have also landed in the city to offer support. Wuhan announced building a second emergency speciality hospital, named Leishenshan Hospital, with a planned capacity of 1,300 beds, to be in use in half a month.

Beijing announced it will halt all inter-provincial bus and train services starting 26 January.

The Politburo of the Chinese Communist Party met to discuss novel coronavirus prevention and control. Xi Jinping stated that the country is facing a "grave situation" as the number of infected people is accelerating.

Straco has shut Shanghai Ocean Aquarium, Underwater World Xiamen and Lixing Cable Car temporarily to curb the virus spreading around.

=== 26 January ===
The leading group on the prevention and control of the novel coronavirus outbreak was established, led by Chinese Premier Li Keqiang. The leading group has decided to extend the Spring Festival holiday to contain coronavirus outbreak.

The Chinese Center for Disease Control and Prevention (CCDC) has started developing vaccines against the coronavirus, an official with the center said on Sunday.

The city of Shantou declared a partial lockdown, though this was quickly reversed.

China banned all wildlife trade with immediate effect.

The United Nations' WHO Director-General Tedros Ghebreyesus said he was on his way to Beijing to confer with Chinese officials and health experts about the coronavirus outbreak.

China started requiring nationwide use of monitoring stations for screening, identification and immediate isolation of coronavirus-infected travellers, including at airports, railway stations, bus stations and ports.

Schools in Beijing would stay closed until further notice to prevent further spread of the coronavirus. Separately, the Beijing Government stated it will not lock-down the city.

=== 27 January ===
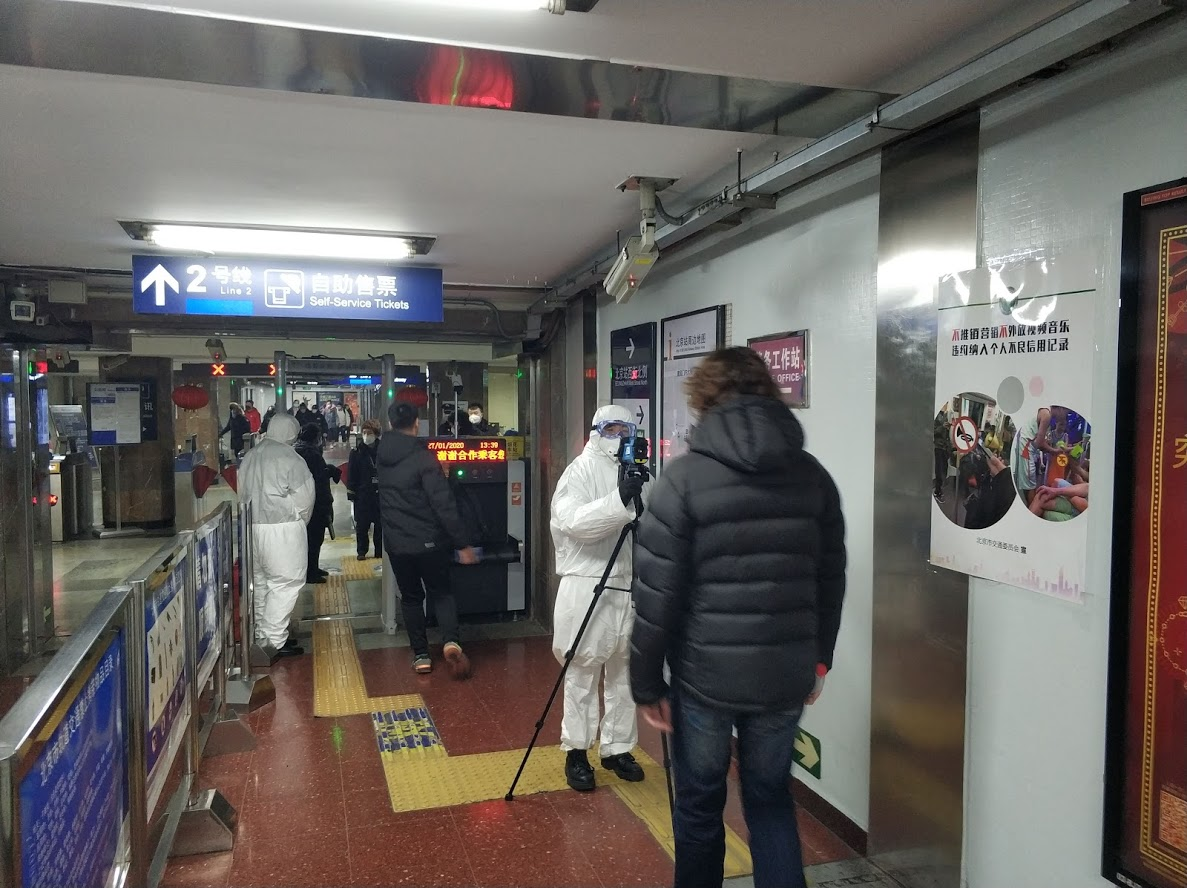
Temperature check at a Beijing metro station on 27 January 2020.

Chinese Premier Li Keqiang visited Wuhan, the centre of the virus outbreak, to direct the epidemic prevention work.

China's Finance Ministry and National Health Commission extended 60.33 billion yuan (US$8.74 billion) to help contain coronavirus.

Xiangyang announced the suspension of ferry services at 00:00 on 28 January, putting the entirety of Hubei province under a city-by-city quarantine, save for Shennongjia Forestry District. The move came after the closure of its railway stations at 00:00 on 27 January, and shutting down of its airport and inter-city bus services earlier.

Wuhan suspends visa and passports services for Chinese citizens until 30 January.

The Shanghai government has said companies in the city are not allowed to resume operations before 9 February. Employees of Chinese tech company Tencent became remote workers.

The mayor of Wuhan acknowledges criticism over his handling of the crisis, admitting that information was not released quickly enough. He said he would resign if it helped with public opinion but pointed out the local government was obliged to seek permission before fully disclosing information about the virus, and that their response had since become "tougher than others".

Tangshan suspends public transit to prevent spread of coronavirus.

=== 28 January ===
Wanda Group waives all rent and property fees for all merchants from 24 January to 25 February, amounting to an estimated fee reduction of ¥3–4 billion (US$432–577 million).

Sasseur REIT shuts four malls temporarily, with another seven outlet malls shut to slow the outbreak.

Dasin Retail Trust shortens hours for its five malls and temporarily closed crowded places.

ComfortDelGro, a Singapore transport company, was told by authorities to shut the Nanjing Comfort Delgro Xixia Driving Centre as a precautionary measure against the coronavirus. Other centres were unaffected.

=== 29 January ===
Tibet reported its first suspected case identified on the previous day and declared a level 1 health emergency in the evening, the last mainland provincial division to do so. Suspected cases have now been reported in all 31 mainland provincial divisions.

Companies in Hubei are required not to resume services before 13 February, and schools in Hubei are to postpone the reopening of schools.

Chinese police drop their case against eight people, accused on 1 January of spreading "false rumours" about a "new SARS-like virus"; they have been referred to as "the eight brave (八勇士)" on some Chinese social media.

CapitaLand temporarily shuts all four malls in Wuhan and both malls in Xian after instructions from local authorities, with supermarkets still open. The company's remaining 45 malls will operate shorter periods. It has also set up a 10 million Yuan fund to fight the coronavirus.

=== 30 January ===
As of 30 January, inter-provincial charter cars in mainland China and inter-provincial passenger routes to Hubei have all been suspended. Passenger transport on roads in ten provinces and municipalities including Hubei and Beijing has been suspended, inter-provincial passenger trains have been suspended in 16 provinces, urban bus routes have been suspended or partially suspended in multiple cities in 28 provinces, and urban rail transportation has been suspended in 5 cities including Wuhan.

The Huanggang Communist Party committee announced the dismissal of its health chief, Tang Zhihong.

Micro-Mechanics temporarily shuts its Suzhou factory after instructions from the authorities there due to the coronavirus, with operations to resume on 10 February.

=== 31 January ===
China National Railway Group announced that starting 1 February, rail ticket purchases must provide the traveller's mobile phone number (email address for foreign nationals).

== Reactions and measures outside mainland China ==
=== 3 January ===
Thailand began screening passengers arriving from Wuhan at four different airports.

Singapore also began screening passengers at Changi Airport.

=== 5 January ===
The "2019–2020 China pneumonia outbreak" Wikipedia article was created by a user from China, which evolved into the English Wikipedia's main article about the pandemic.

=== 6 January ===
The US Centers for Disease Control and Prevention (USCDC) issued a travel watch at Level 1 ("Practice usual precautions") on 6 January, with recommendations on washing hands and more specifically advising avoiding animals, animal markets, and contact with unwell people if travelling to Wuhan.

The US CDC offers to send a US team to assist Chinese experts in their research in regard to transmissibility, severity, and incubation period of the disease.

Hong Kong began screening passengers arriving on trains stopped at Wuhan.

=== 20 January ===
On 20 January, the World Health Organization (WHO) stated that it was "now very clear" that human-to-human transmission of the coronavirus had occurred, given that healthcare workers had been infected.

=== 21 January ===
The World Health Organization announced that it would hold an emergency meeting on the virus the following day to determine if the virus is a "public health emergency of international concern (PHEIC)".

The Panamanian government has enhanced its sanitary control and screening measures at all ports of entry, to prevent the spread of the virus, isolating and testing potential cases.

=== 22 January ===
North Korea closed its borders and banned foreign tourists over the virus.

WHO's emergency committee was unable to reach a consensus—with one member stating that the vote was "50/50. Even."—on whether the outbreak should be classified as a PHEIC due to lack of information. The committee will resume discussion the next day.

Singapore formed a multi-ministry taskforce to deal with the virus. This comes after three more suspected cases are detected.

=== 23 January ===
Following Singapore's first confirmed case on 23 January, Singaporean airline Scoot cancelled flights to Wuhan between 23 and 26 January over the virus outbreak after a lockdown was imposed. Schools have also asked parents to declare their travel plans and monitor their children's health. Other measures will also be taken to ensure the safety of students. MINDEF has since issued two medical advisories to service personnel.

Flights in and out of North Korea were halted. Coronavirus cases in Sinuiju were suspected and promptly quarantined for two weeks.

=== 24 January ===
Following the two laboratory-confirmed cases on 23 January, the Vietnam Aviation Authority sent a written directive requesting that all flights to and from Wuhan are to be cancelled immediately until further notice and that the tickets will be refunded. Exceptionally, the Authority operates four special flights to carry Wuhan passengers home during the period from 24 to 27 January, and a backward flight to evacuate Vietnamese citizens and diplomats.

Border control measures in Singapore have been enhanced and extended to land and sea checkpoints, with the Immigration and Checkpoints Authority and Maritime and Port Authority of Singapore starting temperature checks from noon of that day.

The Russian Far East had closed its border with China until 7 February, while Russian tour operators were inhibited starting 27 January.

=== 25 January ===
Hong Kong declared a state of emergency and announced it would close schools until 17 February. Hong Kong Disneyland and Ocean Park are closed until further notice.

US consulate in Wuhan was closed and all US diplomats were "under ordered departure". The United States announced plans to evacuate US citizens out of Wuhan by charter jet. The US government later clarified that it only had limited capacity for private citizen evacuations.

=== 26 January ===
Hong Kong announced it will ban anyone who has been to Hubei Province in the last 14 days from entering the city starting 27 January.

Singers Andy Lau and Leon Lai have postponed their concerts in Hong Kong and Macau respectively.

=== 27 January ===
On 27 January, the WHO assessed the risk of COVID-19 to be "high at the global level".

Mongolia closed its border with China, shut down schools until 2 March, and called for all public gatherings to be cancelled. The pair of international border gates Hekou (Yunnan, China)–Lào Cai (Vietnam) are suspended against Chinese tourists. The decision was declared by the head of Lào Cai Department of Culture, Sports and Tourism, after an urgent notice from Yunnan Province's authorities.

The Government of Gilgit Baltistan decided to delay opening the China–Pakistan border crossing point at Khunjerab Pass, scheduled for February.

Following the action from Hong Kong authorities, Macau stated that it will deny entry to visitors from the Mainland's Hubei province or those who had visited the province 14 days prior to arrival unless they are virus-free.

Singapore imposed a 14 days leave of absence for those working in schools, healthcare and eldercare who travelled to China in the last 14 days. Students who returned from these places will do home-based learning instead. In addition, people who went to China the last 14 days must fill health and travel declarations and monitor health with temperature checks.

Malaysia suspends all visa facilities for Chinese tourists from Hubei and its neighbouring provinces in China.

Tijuana, Mexico receives its final scheduled non-stop flight from mainland China before a previously scheduled suspension of service. Passengers and crew were screened by health officials upon arrival to the Tijuana International Airport. Flights between Tijuana and mainland China are scheduled to resume in May 2020.

The USCDC expands travel advisory from Wuhan to the whole of Hubei Province. Later that day, the US State Department raised the travel advisory for China to Level 3 ("Reconsider Travel: Avoid travel due to serious risks to safety and security.") due to the coronavirus. The same day, the USCDC again updates its travel health notice to Warning – Level 3, Avoid All Nonessential Travel to China.

=== 28 January ===
The Philippines and Sri Lanka suspended issuance of visas-on-arrival to Chinese nationals.

Singapore announced a suspension from 29 January, 12pm of entry or transit for all new visitors with a recent travel history to Hubei within the last 14 days, or holders of China passports issued in Hubei.

Hong Kong temporarily closes four of the eleven ports with the Mainland. Carrie Lam, the Chief Executive, stated the high-speed rail service between Hong Kong and mainland China would be suspended starting 30 January and all cross-border ferry services would also be suspended in a bid to stop the spread of coronavirus. Additionally, flights from mainland China were reduced by 50 percent, cross-border bus services was reduced, and the Hong Kong government shifted its employees (except those providing essential or emergency services) to remote work. In a later press conference, Carrie Lam said that the Man Kam To and Sha Tau Kok border checkpoints would be closed.

Thailand starts scanning all travellers from China with immediate effect.

The UK's Foreign Office warns Britons not to travel to mainland China unless their journey is essential. Existing advice against all travel to Hubei Province remains in place.

The USCDC stated it was boosting staffing at 20 US airports that have quarantine facilities.

Singer Miriam Yeung postponed a concert in Singapore, which was scheduled on 8 February. This comes after the virus situation in China worsened with most of the logistics coming from there.

=== 29 January ===
The government of Papua New Guinea banned all travellers from Asian countries and closed its border with Indonesia. The order takes effect from 30 January.

Palau and Vanuatu temporarily suspended flights from mainland China, Macau, and Hong Kong until the end of February and restricted diplomatic work in those countries. The Federated States of Micronesia is considering the same measures.

The government of Kazakhstan suspended visa issuances to Chinese citizens. In addition, all transport links from and to China have been halted; accordingly, movement by train will stop on 1 February, and will stop by aeroplane from 3 February. Georgia temporarily suspended all direct flights with China.

Rasuwa Fort, which is a border crossing between Rasuwa District (Nepal) and Tibet (China), will be sealed for 15 days starting 29 January. The decision was preceded by a meeting between security and immigration authorities of two countries earlier that day.

The WHO announces that its director-general has decided to reconvene their international health regulations emergency committee on 30 January to reconsider declaring a global health emergency, technically a "public health emergency of international concern" (PHEIC). The reconvening is due "mainly on the evidence of increasing number of cases, human-to-human transmission outside of China, and the further development of transmission." The committee meeting is planned to start at 13:30 Geneva time. Further, the WHO announces their having set up "The Pandemic Supply Chain Network (PSCN)" in collaboration with the World Economic Forum.

The Government of Canada issued a travel advisory to avoid non-essential travel to China due to the novel coronavirus outbreak. The Government of Canada also issued a regional travel advisory to avoid all travel to the province of Hubei—including the cities of Wuhan, Huanggang and Ezhou—due to the imposition of heavy travel restrictions to limit the spread of the novel coronavirus. On the same day, the Minister of Foreign Affairs François-Philippe Champagne announced that an aircraft would be sent to repatriate Canadians from the areas affected by the novel coronavirus in China. As a result of the travel advisories issued by the Canadian government, Air Canada suspended all direct flights to China until at least 29 February.

The Ministry of Popular Power for Health announced that the Rafael Rangel National Institute of Hygiene (Spanish: Instituto Nacional de Higiene Rafael Rangel) in Caracas will perform the detection of other respiratory viruses based on non-influenza types, including coronaviruses in humans. It is also the only health institute in the country with the installed capacity for the diagnosis of respiratory viruses in Venezuela and is able carry out logistics in the 23 states, the Capital District and Federal Dependencies.

British Airways and Lufthansa cancel all flights to and from mainland China.

Singapore expanded temperature screening to cover all incoming flights with additional checks on flights from China and passengers from Hubei.

The Panama Canal began to require all ships to report if they had any contact with coronavirus-infected countries. The Panamanian health ministry also established an isolation ward for coronavirus patients.

=== 30 January ===
Map of the WHO's regional offices and their respective operating regions. Africa; HQ: Brazzaville, Republic of Congo Western Pacific; HQ: Manila, Philippines Eastern Mediterranean; HQ: Cairo, Egypt South East Asia; HQ: New Delhi, India Europe; HQ: Copenhagen, Denmark Americas; HQ: Washington, DC, USA

The WHO director-general declares the coronavirus outbreak a "Public Health Emergency of International Concern" (PHEIC), reversing two previous decisions after emergency committee meetings in the last week. WHO also issued a warning that "all countries should be prepared for containment, including active surveillance, early detection, isolation and case management, contact tracing and prevention of onward spread" of the virus.

Vietnam shuts down air traffic with China. The Ministry of Public Security temporarily ceased issuing visa to Chinese citizens within the epidemic areas. Additionally, crossing at gateways, airports, seaports are put under higher supervision, with strict monitoring and medical check-ups (applied to both humans and items; prohibited against wildlife animals and derivatives). Later that day, after confirmation of the virus for the first three Vietnamese patients, the Prime Minister ordered for further visa restrictions apart from diplomatic work, suspension of activities at border gates (with China) which are still active, evacuation for citizens when necessary, and an emergency alert being considered.

The Liaison Office between the two Koreas in the border town of Kaesong was shut down for an unspecified time regarding infection concern. The decision was made after negotiations between the representatives of both countries early in the morning on 30 January, informed by the Unification Ministry of South Korea.

North Korea's news agency KCNA declared a "state emergency" and reported the establishment of anti-epidemic headquarters around the country.

Singapore announced that every household was to receive four masks starting from 1 February.

Russia announces restrictions on railway travel with China, such that only a direct train between Moscow and Beijing remains.

Italian Prime Minister Giuseppe Conte stated in a press conference that Italy had closed all air traffic to and from China. It is believed that Conte has also called a cabinet meeting for Friday to discuss further actions. Six thousand people are briefly quarantined on board an Italian cruise ship as tests are carried out on two Chinese passengers suspected of having coronavirus, a spokesman for the Costa Crociere cruise company said. The same day, all passengers are released as it is found that the ill individual has the flu, not coronavirus.

The US State Department issued an updated travel advisory as "Level 4: Do Not Travel to China." Its website stated that "Those currently in China should consider departing" and warning that "Travelers should be prepared for travel restrictions to be put into effect with little or no advance notice". Additionally, it authorised American diplomatic staff and their families to evacuate China. The State of Washington in the US declared a Level 1 Emergency and activated its Emergency Response Center for dealing with the now global coronavirus outbreak.

British foreign secretary Dominic Raab disclosed that the emergency flight containing about 120 Britons from Wuhan that was delayed by 24 hours was due to land at RAF Brize Norton on Friday morning, where the passengers will be taken to Wirral for a fortnight's quarantine.

Trinidad and Tobago's health minister, Terrence Deyalsingh, announced that Trinidad and Tobago had decided to implement restrictions on persons travelling from China. Persons who are living or who have visited China will be barred from entering Trinidad and Tobago unless they had already been out of China 14 days prior to attempting to travel to Trinidad and Tobago.

Air France and KLM cancel all flights to mainland China until 9 February.

Two K-pop concerts in Singapore by Taeyeon and NCT Group respectively were postponed after the virus situation worsened.

The National Library of Medicine began collection of website and social media reporting of the virus outbreak as part of its Global Health Events archiving.

=== 31 January ===
Russian authorities announced the border closure with China would be extended to at least 1 March.

Authorities in Guangxi (China) and Lạng Sơn (Vietnam) announced the temporary suspension of nine auxiliary border gates (namely in pair: Tân Thanh – 浦寨, Chi Ma – 爱店, Cốc Nam – 弄怀, Bình Nghi – 平宜, Pò Nhùng – 油隘, Bản Chắt – 板烂, Co Sâu – 北山, Na Hình, and Nà Nưa) and border markets starting 31 January until 8 February, and prohibited all travel over cross-border trails.

Singapore closed borders to all visitors arriving from mainland China (including passengers transiting through Singapore) except Singaporeans, Singapore residents and long-term visa holders. The measure took effect on 1 February at 11.59 pm.

Macau announced it would postpone schools indefinitely and that schools should contact students to arrange for assignments to be done online. Hong Kong extended the public holiday to 2 March, and also requested all visitors who have been in Hubei in the past 14 days to be quarantined. All government employees became remote workers.

Italy declared a state of emergency, the first EU country to do so, and allocates an initial 5 million Euros to tackle the virus.

The United States government declares a Public Health Emergency due to the coronavirus, and is closing its borders to all foreign nationals "who pose a threat of transmitting the virus from entering the country and would quarantine U.S. citizens returning from Hubei province in China, the epicenter of the outbreak, for up to 14 days," starting Sunday, 2 February at 5 pm. The 195 Americans on the Air Force base in California whom were recently evacuated from Wuhan recently will also be quarantined.

Jamaica's health minister, Christopher Tufton, announced a government decision to ban travel between China and Jamaica. All persons entering Jamaica from China will be subject to immediate quarantine for at least 14 days, and anyone who was allowed to land and shows symptoms of the virus will be put in immediate isolation. In keeping with the new policy, 19 Chinese nationals who arrived at the Norman Manley International Airport on the evening of 31 January were denied entry, quarantined and put on a flight back to China on 1 February.

The Ecuadorian Ministry of Health, Catalina Andramuño, announced that the country now possesses reagents for testing new cases locally, becoming the first in South America.

LOT Polish Airlines cancels all flights to Beijing until 9 February. Delta Air Lines suspends all China flights, and American Airlines pilots sue for same action. Later, American Airlines ceased flights to China as well. Later still, United Airlines halts all flights to China, excepting San Francisco to Hong Kong.

Basra International Airport in Iraq has declared that passengers of any nationality travelling from China will be denied entry.

Turkish Airlines halted all flights to China until 9 February.

K-pop band Got7's concert in Singapore, scheduled for 22 February, was postponed due to the virus.

== See also ==
- Timeline of the COVID-19 pandemic
- Timeline of the COVID-19 pandemic in January 2020
