= Yang Xiaobo (politician, born 1963) =

Chinese politician (1963–2020)

- 杨晓波

Mayor of Huangshi
- In office February 2009 – December 2014
- Preceded by: Wang Jianming
- Succeeded by: Dong Weimin

Member of the National People's Congress (12th)
- In office March 2013 – March 2018
- Chairman: Zhang Dejiang
- Constituency: Hubei

Director-general of the Construction Department of Hubei Province
- In office April 2007 – December 2008
- Preceded by: Zhang Famao
- Succeeded by: Li Debing

Personal details
- Born: January 1963 Tianmen, Hubei
- Died: 27 January 2020 (aged 57) Wuhan, Hubei
- Cause of death: Pneumonia induced by COVID-19
- Party: Chinese Communist Party
- Education: Beijing Jiaotong University; Tianjin University; Ohio University
- Profession: Structural engineer

Chinese name
- Simplified Chinese: 杨晓波
- Traditional Chinese: 楊曉波
Transcriptions
Standard Mandarin
- Hanyu Pinyin: Yáng Xiǎobō

Yang Xiaobo (January 1963 – 27 January 2020) was a Chinese structural engineer, politician, and insurance executive. He served as President of the Central South Architectural Design Institute (2003–2007), Mayor of Huangshi, Hubei (2009–2014), and President of Changjiang Property Insurance Company (2014–2020), and was a delegate to the 12th National People's Congress (2013–2018). He died of severe pneumonia during the COVID-19 pandemic in Hubei.

== Early life and education ==
Yang was born in January 1963 in Tianmen, Hubei. He entered Beijing Jiaotong University in 1981, majoring in structural engineering. After earning his bachelor's degree in September 1985, he pursued graduate studies at Tianjin University, earning his master's degree in structural engineering in June 1988. He joined the Chinese Communist Party (CCP) in May 1988.

== Career ==
In June 1988, Yang became an engineer at the Central South Architectural Design Institute, where he worked in structural design of industrial and residential buildings. He later earned an MBA degree from Ohio University in the United States. He was promoted to President of the Central South Architectural Design Institute in April 2003, serving until 2007.

Yang entered the Hubei Provincial Government in April 2007 to serve as Director of the Department of Construction. He subsequently studied at the Central Party School of the Chinese Communist Party from March 2008 to January 2009, and was appointed acting mayor and later Mayor of Huangshi, a prefecture-level city east of Wuhan, in February 2009. He also concurrently served as CCP Deputy Committee Secretary of Huangshi. He was a member of the 10th Hubei Provincial Committee of the CCP and a delegate to the 12th National People's Congress (2013–2018).

In December 2014, Yang was appointed President of Changjiang Property Insurance Company Ltd., a joint venture established in 2011 by China Guodian Corporation together with several state-owned enterprises controlled by the Hubei provincial government. It was headquartered in Wuhan, the capital of Hubei province. Under his leadership, the company signed strategic cooperation agreements with many local governments in Hubei, but also received many citations from the China Banking and Insurance Regulatory Commission for violating industry regulations. It was fined 100,000 yuan in March 2019 for appointing people lacking professional qualifications to top executive positions.

== Death ==
Yang made his last public appearance on 17 December 2019. On 1 January 2020, he sent a new year's greeting to all employees of Changjiang Property Insurance. On 28 January 2020, Chinese media reported that Yang Xiaobo had died of severe pneumonia at age 57 during the COVID-19 pandemic in Hubei. He was one of the 100 people who had died during the outbreak in Hubei by that date.
