= Jincheng =

City in Shanxi, China

Jincheng 晋城市 Tsincheng
- Prefecture-level city
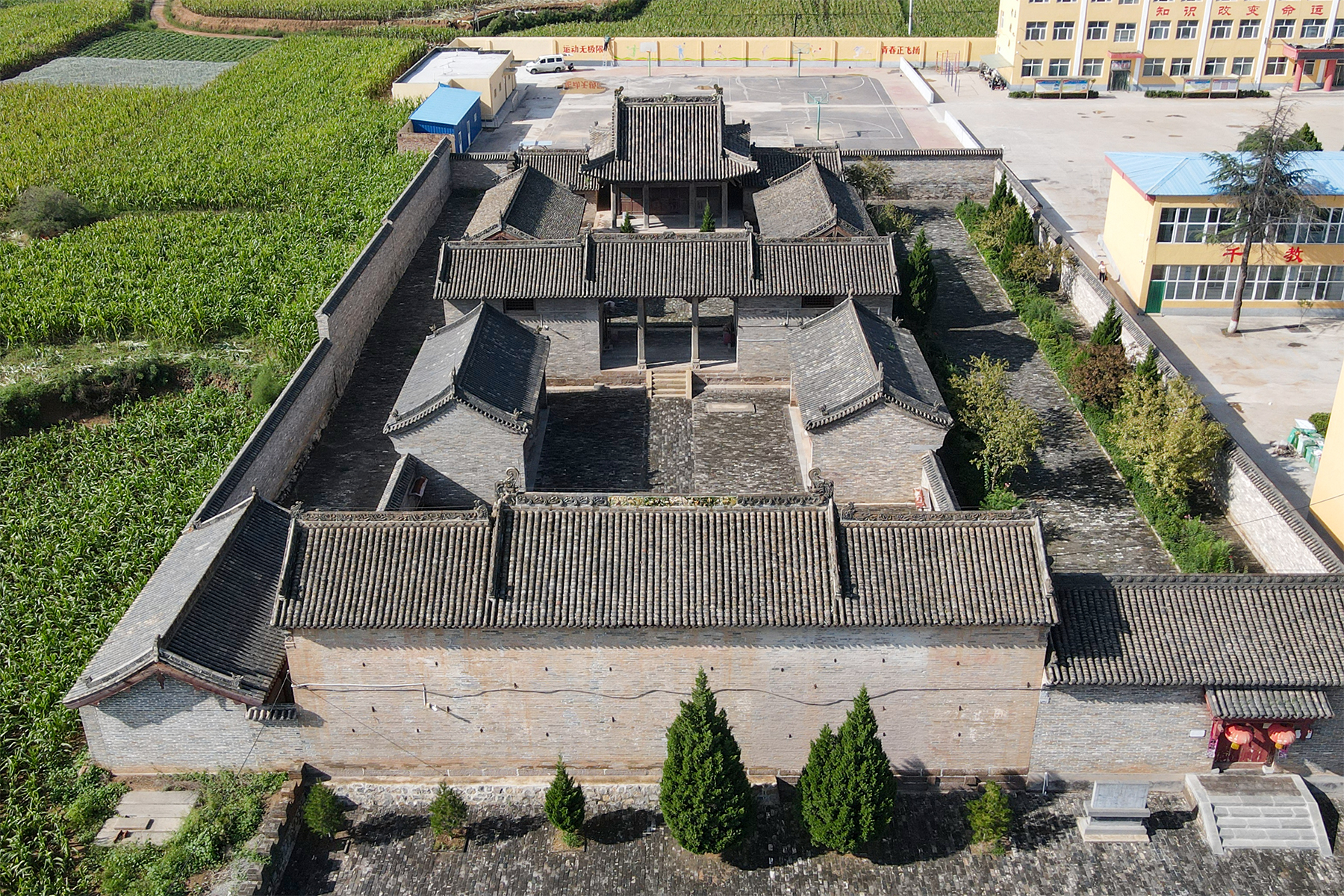
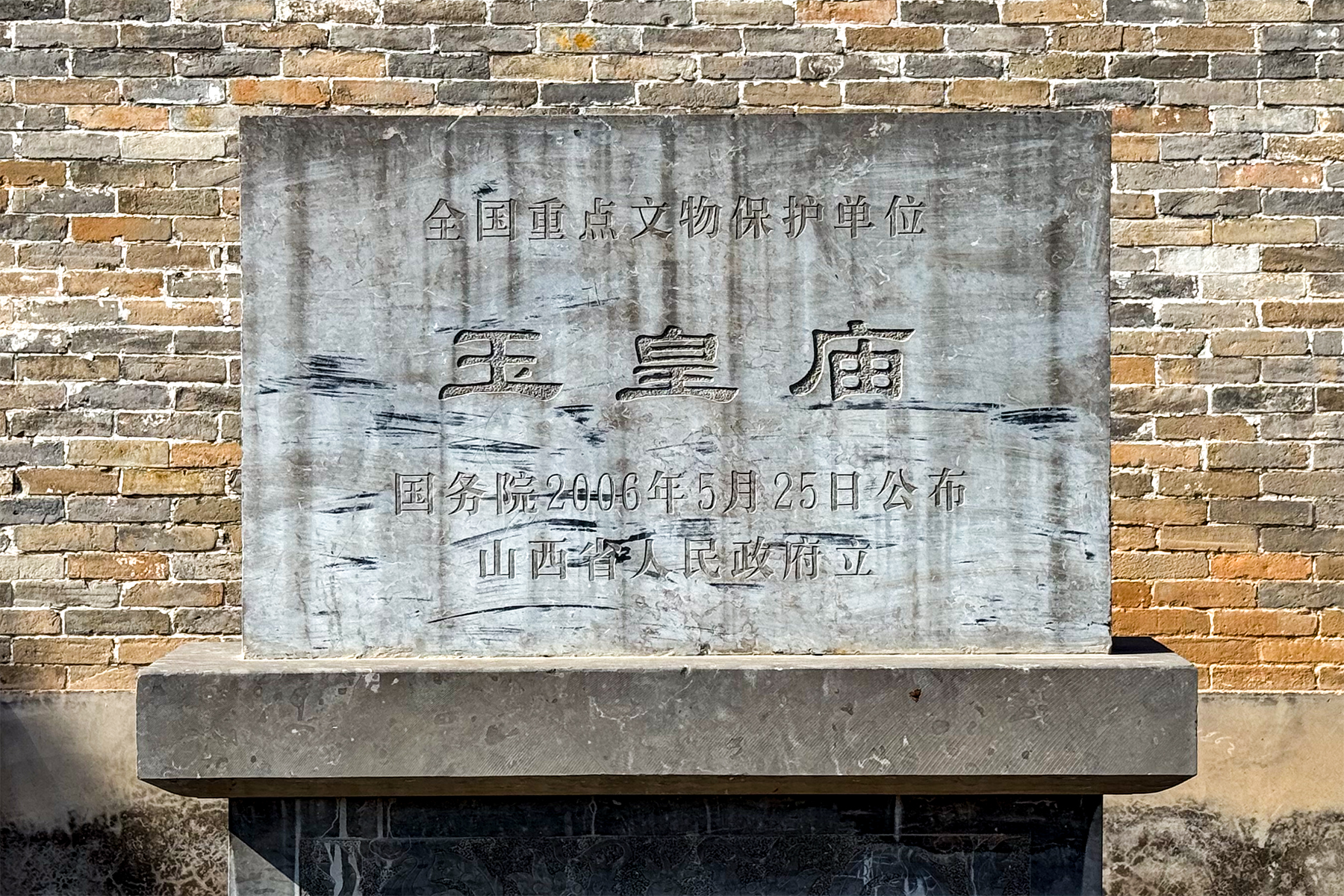
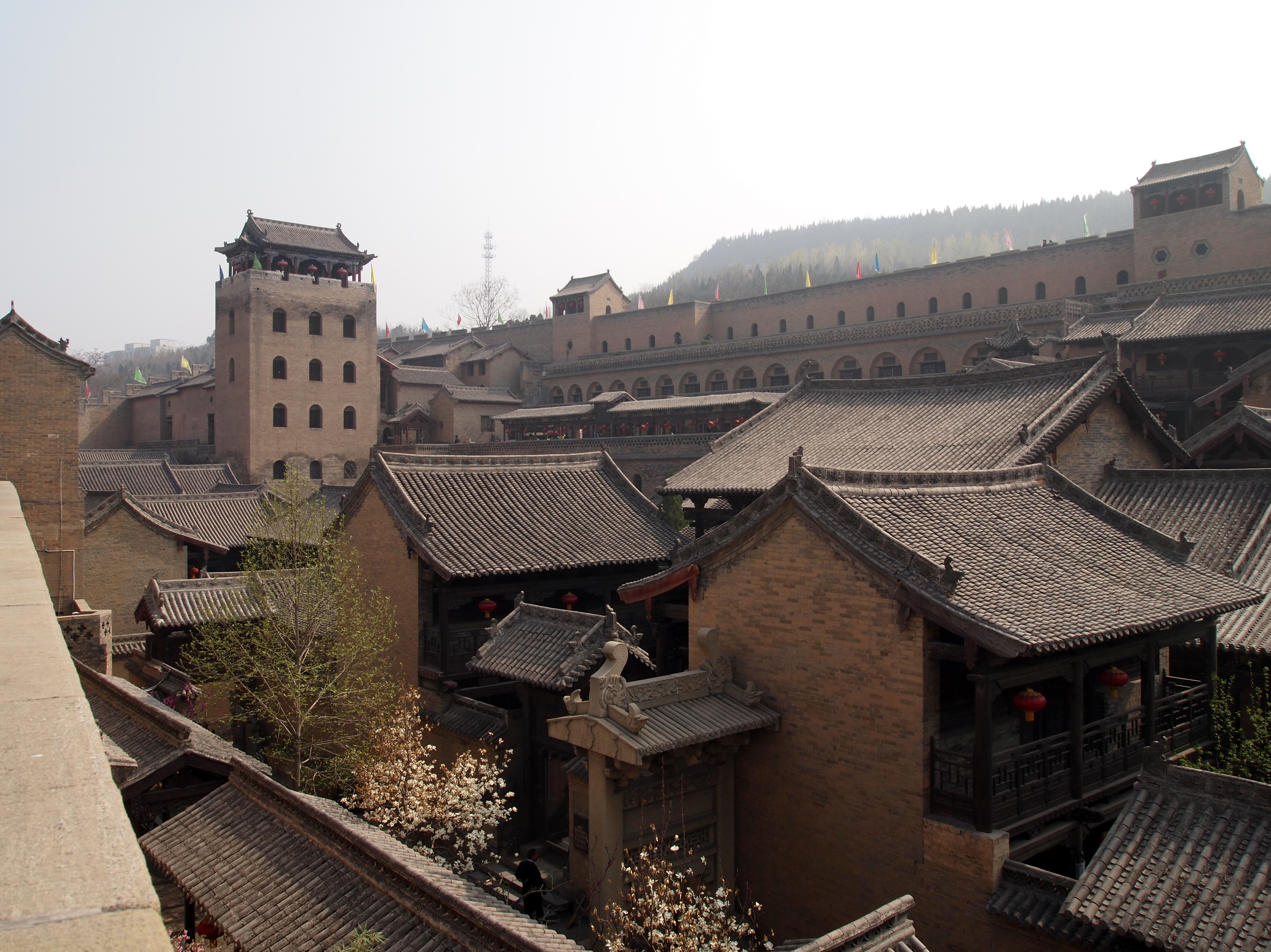

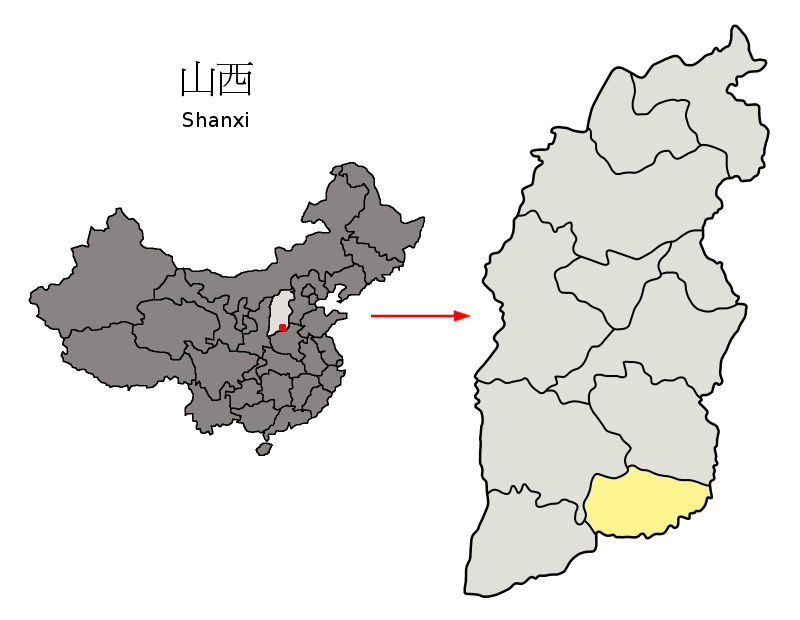
- Location of Jincheng City jurisdiction in Shanxi

- Location of the city center in Shanxi
- Coordinates (Jincheng municipal government): 35°29′28″N 112°51′07″E
- Country: People's Republic of China
- Province: Shanxi
- County-level divisions: 6
- Municipal seat: Chengqu

Government
  - Type: Prefecture-level city
  - CPC Jincheng Secretary: Wang Zhen (王震)
  - Mayor: Xue Mingyao (薛明耀)

Area
  - Prefecture-level city: 9,490 km^{2} (3,660 sq mi)
  - Urban: 143.00 km^{2} (55.21 sq mi)
  - Districts: 2,164.0 km^{2} (835.5 sq mi)

Population
  - Prefecture-level city: 2,279,151
  - Density: 240/km^{2} (622/sq mi)
  - Urban: 493,000
  - Urban density: 3,450/km^{2} (8,930/sq mi)
  - Districts: 1,067,000

GDP
  - Prefecture-level city: CN¥ 142.6 billion US$ 22.4 billion
  - Per capita: CN¥ 65,122; US$ 10,420
- Time zone: UTC+8 (China Standard)
- Postal code: 048000
- Area code: 0356
- ISO 3166 code: CN-SX-05
- Licence plates: 晋E
- Administrative division code: 140500
- Website: www.JCOnline.cn

Jincheng
- Simplified Chinese: 晋城
- Traditional Chinese: 晉城
- Literal meaning: Jin City
Transcriptions
Standard Mandarin
- Hanyu Pinyin: Jìnchéng
- Wade–Giles: Chin-ch‘êng

Jincheng is a prefecture-level city situated in the southeast of Shanxi province, China. It shares its border with Henan province to the south and southeast. The city is recognized as an industrial hub, with coal mining being one of its key industries. The population of the entire city is estimated to be 2.2 million.

Due to the extensive coal industry in the region, Jincheng has gained notoriety for air pollution. However, the local government has recently made significant investments to address this issue. Efforts have been made to enhance the air quality in the city, such as tree planting, developing and maintaining vast parks and ecological reserves, shutting down or relocating some of the most polluting factories, and promoting the use of coalbed methane, which is a cleaner fuel source than coal.

Jincheng is one of the birthplaces of Chinese civilization. Many legends in Chinese mythology have their origins in Jincheng, such as Nüwa, Jingwei, Yu Gong, Emperor Yao Emperor Shun, Shennong and so on. The Xiachuan site discovered in Xiachuan, Qinshui County in 1972 is a cultural relic from the late Paleolithic Age, proving that humans lived and thrived here more than 20,000 years ago; the Tashui site discovered in Duohuo Township, Lingchuan County in 1986 The He site belongs to the cave life site of ancient humans in the Paleolithic Age. It has been identified by archaeological experts as being about 100,000 to 70,000 years old.

== History ==
Jincheng has a rich history dating back to the Warring States period. During this time, the land of Jin was divided and settled by Zhao, Wei, and Han. Later, the Late Jin monarch was settled in Qinshui County of Jincheng. The famous battle of Changping between Qin and Zhao took place in Gaoping City of Jincheng towards the end of the Warring States period. After the first emperor of Qin unified the six countries, China was divided into 36 shires, and most of Jincheng and Southeast Shanxi belonged to Shangdang Shire. Throughout the Han and Wei dynasties, Jincheng remained a part of Shangdang Shire and Pingyang Shire.

During the Sixteen States period, West Yan Murong Yong established Jianxing Shire in the southern region of Shangdang Shire, which marked the beginning of Jincheng becoming a Shire. Subsequently, the name of Jianxing Shire was changed several times, first to Jianzhou during the Northern Wei dynasty, then to Zezhou during the Sui dynasty, and finally, it was upgraded to Zezhoufu during the Qing dynasty. These administrative changes were essentially consistent with the five counties under the jurisdiction of Jincheng today. It was not until the Republic of China period that Yuan Shikai issued a policy to transform all Chinese states into counties.

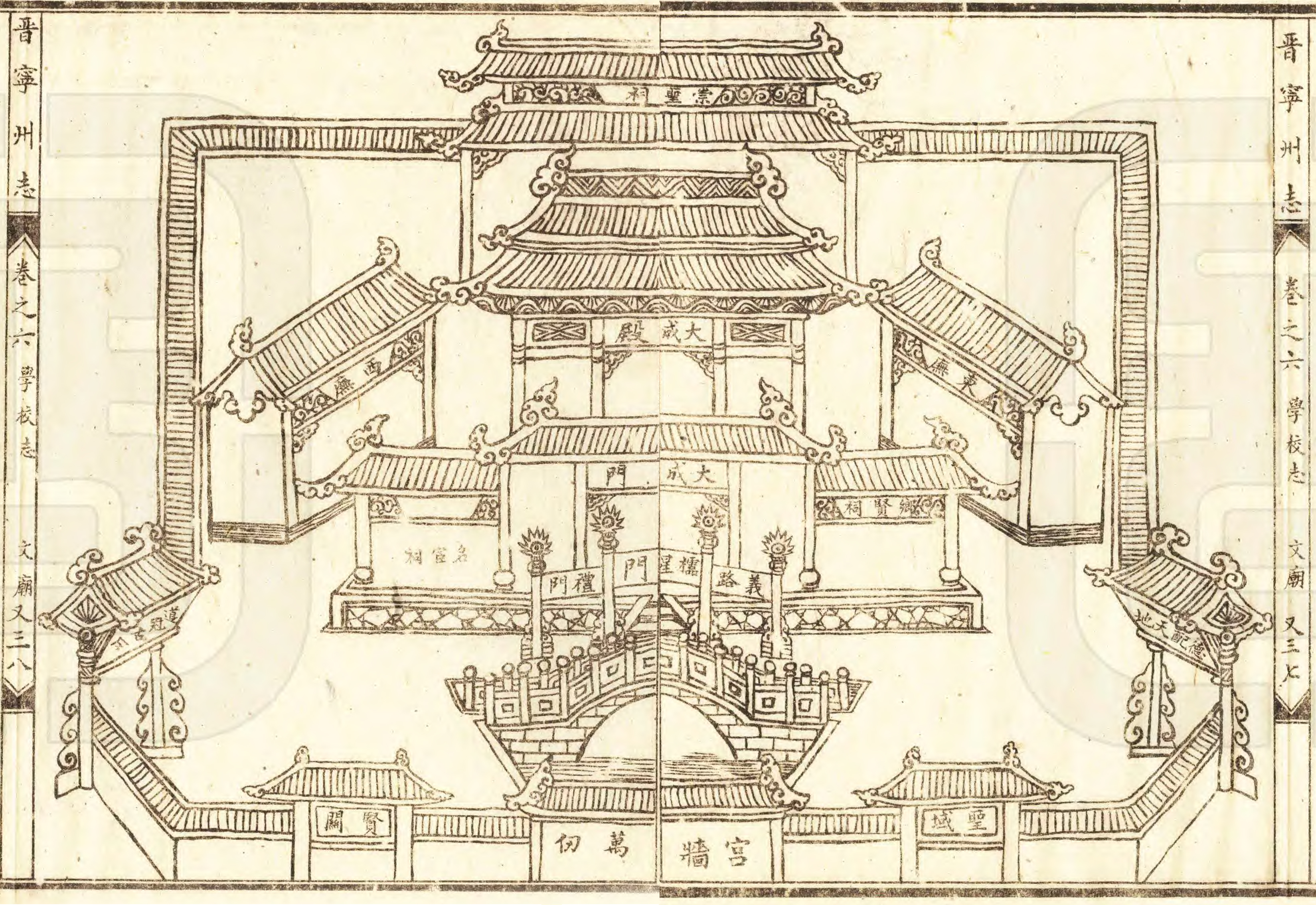
The Confucian Temple of Jincheng, as depicted in the Gazetteer of Jinning Prefecture, compiled during the Daoguang reign (1821–1850) of the Qing dynasty.

In May 1985, with the approval of the State Council, Jincheng was upgraded to a prefecture-level city. The original Jincheng (county-level) was divided into urban areas and suburbs. The four counties of Gaoping, Yangcheng, Lingchuan, and Qinshui that were originally under the jurisdiction of southeastern Shanxi were placed under the jurisdiction of Jincheng City. Jincheng is under the jurisdiction of Shanxi Province.

== Economy ==
Jincheng boasts abundant mineral resources, particularly coal. Coal-beds cover more than 56% of the total area, predominantly comprising anthracite, a high-quality coal with minimal impurities. The anthracite reserves in Jincheng account for over a quarter of China's total and half of Shanxi province's total. In addition, Jincheng has a substantial coal mine methane field, discovered in Qinshui county in 2001. The production of both anthracite and coal mine methane is mainly carried out by Jincheng Anthracite Mining Group.

Apart from its coal-related industries, Jincheng also houses a significant Foxconn manufacturing campus that produces fiber optic parts, with an annual output value of over 3 billion RMB. Currently, Foxconn's largest product in Jincheng is the mechanical components of mobile phones, including camera components, frames and back covers. The annual output is about 35 million pieces, with an output value of about 7 billion yuan.

== Geography ==
Jincheng is situated in the southeastern corner of Shanxi province, covering an area of 9,490 square kilometers. The urban area of Jincheng City is located in the southeast of Shanxi Province, with geographical coordinates of 112*45’10”~112”55’08” east longitude and 35”24’55”~35’35’45” north latitude. It has 188,920 hectares of arable land. The urban area is located in the center of the Zezhou basin. The terrain is high in the northwest and low in the southeast. Landform types include low and medium mountains, hills and river valleys.

== Transportation ==
Jincheng is accessible via China National Highway 207 and the Taiyuan–Jiaozuo Railway. However, it does not have a commercial airport, with the nearest ones located in nearby cities such as Zhengzhou, Changzhi, and Luoyang.

Jincheng Station is located at Huijun Street in the southeast of the main urban area of Jincheng City. It was built in 1959 and is under the jurisdiction of the Zhengzhou Railway Bureau. It is a second-class passenger and freight station on the Taijiao Line mainly used for passenger transport. Located in the southeastern region of Shanxi Province, it plays an important gateway connecting the four provinces of Shanxi, Hebei, Henan and Shandong to other regions of the Central Plains.

Jincheng East Station is located in Shuidong Village on the east side of Jincun New District. The parking lot has 3 trains and 7 lines, including 2 main lines. The station type is side-down, with a construction area of 37,814 square meters.

== Climate ==
Jincheng has a rather dry, monsoon-influenced humid continental climate (Köppen Dwa), with cold and very dry winters, and hot, humid summers. The monthly 24-hour average temperature ranges from −2.2 °C (28.0 °F) in January to 24.2 °C (75.6 °F) in July, and the annual mean is 11.83 °C (53.3 °F). Typifying the influence of the East Asian Monsoon, over two-thirds of the annual 576 millimetres (22.7 in) of precipitation occurs from June to September. On average, there are 2319.9 annual sunshine hours, 93 annual rainfall days, with an annual precipitation of 573.8 mm. The maximum rainfall in an extreme year is 1010.4 mm (1956), and the minimum rainfall in an extreme year is 265.7 mm (1997). Rainfall is concentrated from June to September every year, with the highest rainfall in July.

Climate data for Jincheng, elevation 753 m (2,470 ft), (1991–2020 normals, extremes 1981–2010)
Month	Jan	Feb	Mar	Apr	May	Jun	Jul	Aug	Sep	Oct	Nov	Dec	Year
Record high °C (°F)	19.1 (66.4)	24.2 (75.6)	28.2 (82.8)	36.9 (98.4)	36.5 (97.7)	38.6 (101.5)	38.6 (101.5)	35.8 (96.4)	36.6 (97.9)	32.6 (90.7)	26.6 (79.9)	18.7 (65.7)	38.6 (101.5)
Mean daily maximum °C (°F)	4.0 (39.2)	7.4 (45.3)	13.3 (55.9)	20.2 (68.4)	25.1 (77.2)	28.8 (83.8)	29.5 (85.1)	28.1 (82.6)	24.0 (75.2)	18.6 (65.5)	11.8 (53.2)	5.7 (42.3)	18.0 (64.5)
Daily mean °C (°F)	−1.9 (28.6)	1.3 (34.3)	6.9 (44.4)	13.5 (56.3)	18.9 (66.0)	23.0 (73.4)	24.5 (76.1)	23.1 (73.6)	18.6 (65.5)	12.7 (54.9)	5.9 (42.6)	0.0 (32.0)	12.2 (54.0)
Mean daily minimum °C (°F)	−6.4 (20.5)	−3.3 (26.1)	1.7 (35.1)	7.8 (46.0)	13.2 (55.8)	17.7 (63.9)	20.5 (68.9)	19.4 (66.9)	14.4 (57.9)	8.0 (46.4)	1.3 (34.3)	−4.4 (24.1)	7.5 (45.5)
Record low °C (°F)	−17.4 (0.7)	−17.4 (0.7)	−10.1 (13.8)	−3.6 (25.5)	2.9 (37.2)	10.1 (50.2)	13.5 (56.3)	11.0 (51.8)	4.4 (39.9)	−3.6 (25.5)	−12.6 (9.3)	−16.6 (2.1)	−17.4 (0.7)
Average precipitation mm (inches)	9.0 (0.35)	12.4 (0.49)	16.5 (0.65)	36.7 (1.44)	49.0 (1.93)	67.9 (2.67)	136.6 (5.38)	120.7 (4.75)	71.4 (2.81)	36.4 (1.43)	20.6 (0.81)	5.6 (0.22)	582.8 (22.93)
Average precipitation days (≥ 0.1 mm)	4.0	4.5	5.3	6.3	7.6	8.9	12.4	11.6	10.0	7.0	5.0	3.4	86
Average snowy days	5.0	4.9	2.7	0.4	0	0	0	0	0	0.1	2.0	4.0	19.1
Average relative humidity (%)	52	55	52	54	55	60	74	76	71	64	58	51	60
Mean monthly sunshine hours	169.4	168.2	201.2	228.9	246.6	226.6	201.5	194.8	166.8	176.2	169.8	175.9	2,325.9
Percentage possible sunshine	54	54	54	58	57	52	46	47	45	51	56	58	53
Source: China Meteorological Administration

== Administrative divisions ==
Map
Name	Hanzi	Hanyu Pinyin	Population (2003 est.)	Area (km^{2})	Density (/km^{2})
Cheng District	城区	Chéngqū	280,000	141	1,986
Gaoping City	高平市	Gāopíng Shì	480,000	946	507
Zezhou County	泽州县	Zézhōu Xiàn	510,000	2,023	252
Qinshui County	沁水县	Qìnshuǐ Xiàn	210,000	2,655	79
Yangcheng County	阳城县	Yángchéng Xiàn	390,000	1,968	198
Lingchuan County	陵川县	Língchuān Xiàn	250,000	1,751	143

Jincheng currently has jurisdiction over six counties (cities and districts) including Chengqu, Zezhou, Gaoping City, Yangcheng, Lingchuan and Qinshui, with a total area of 9,490 square kilometers.
