= Chengqu, Jincheng =

Cheng 城区
- District
- Location in Shanxi
- Coordinates (Chengqu government): 35°30′05″N 112°51′12″E
- Country: People's Republic of China
- Province: Shanxi
- Prefecture-level city: Jincheng

Area
  - Total: 141 km^{2} (54 sq mi)

Population (2020)
  - Total: 574,665
  - Density: 4,080/km^{2} (10,600/sq mi)
- Time zone: UTC+8 (China Standard)
- Website: archived link

Chengqu (simplified Chinese: 城区; traditional Chinese: 城區; pinyin: Chéngqū; lit. 'urban district'), or Cheng District is a district of Jincheng, Shanxi, China. As of 2010, it had a population of 470,000, an increase of 56.78% from 2000, living in an area of 141 km^{2} (54 sq mi).

== Administrative divisions ==
Name	Chinese (S)	Hanyu Pinyin	Population (2010)	Residential communities	Villages
Dong Street Subdistrict	东街街道	Dōngjiē Jiēdào	54,671	11	
Xi Street Subdistrict	西街街道	Xījiē Jiēdào	57,791	18	
Nan Street Subdistrict	南街街道	Nánjiē Jiēdào	51,947	8	
Bei Street Subdistrict	北街街道	Běijiē Jiēdào	41,923	8	
Kuangqu Subdistrict	矿区街道	Kuàngqū Jiēdào	47,512	7	
Zhongjiazhuang Subdistrict	钟家庄街道	Zhōngjiāzhuāng Jiēdào	111,078	19	15
Xishangzhuang Subdistrict	西上庄街道	Xīshàngzhuāng Jiēdào	36,460	4	29
Beishidian	北石店镇	Běishídiàn Zhèn	33,407		23
Development Zone	开发区	Kāifāqū	42,156	4	
