= Wangcun =

Wangcun may refer to the following locations in China:

- Wangcun Subdistrict (王村街道), Kuangqu, Datong, Shanxi

== Towns ==
- Wangcun, Xiuning County (汪村镇), Anhui
- Wangcun, Dacheng County (旺村镇), Hebei

Written as "王村镇":

- Wangcun, She County, Anhui
- Wangcun, Gansu, in Jingchuan County
- Wangcun, Xingyang, Henan
- Wangcun, Xinxiang, in Muye District, Xinxiang, Henan
- Wangcun, Heyang County, Shaanxi
- Wangcun, Qian County, Shaanxi
- Wangcun, Jimo, Shandong
- Wangcun, Zibo, in Zhoucun District, Zibo, Shandong
- Wangcun, Xiangyuan County, Shanxi
- Wangcun, Sichuan, in Jingyan County

== Townships ==
The following entries are all written as "王村乡":

- Wangcun Township, Daming County, Hebei
- Wangcun Township, Laishui County, Hebei
- Wangcun Township, Fengqiu County, Henan
- Wangcun Township, Nanyang, Henan, in Wolong District, Nanyang, Henan
- Wangcun Township, Shanxi, in Jingle County
