= Wucheng, Lüliang =

Wucheng 吴城镇
- Town
- Location in Shanxi
- Coordinates: 37°25′45″N 111°27′58″E
- Country: People's Republic of China
- Province: Shanxi
- Prefecture-level city: Lüliang
- District: Lishi District
- Village-level divisions: 16 villages
- Elevation: 1,361 m (4,465 ft)
- Time zone: UTC+8 (China Standard)
- Area code: 0358

Wucheng (simplified Chinese: 吴城; traditional Chinese: 吳城; pinyin: Wúchéng) is a town in Lishi District, Lüliang, in western Shanxi province, People's Republic of China. It is located 30 kilometres (19 mi) east-southeast of downtown Lüliang as the crow flies. The Taiyuan-Zhongwei-Yinchuan Railway runs through Wucheng, but there is apparently no passenger station here; in addition, China National Highway 307 and G20 Qingdao–Yinchuan Expressway pass through the town. As of 2011, it has 16 villages under its administration.

== See also ==
- List of township-level divisions of Shanxi
