= Yangping =

Yangping could refer to the following locations in China:

- Yangping, Hebei (羊平镇), town in Quyang County
- Yangping, Yuan'an County (洋坪镇), town in Hubei
- Yangping Township (阳坪乡), Kelan County, Shanxi

Towns written as "阳平镇":

- Yangping, Henan, in Lingbao, Henan
- Yangping, Xiaogan, in Dawu County, Hubei
- Yangping, Shaanxi, in Chencang District, Baoji

For use in Chinese linguistics, it refers to the light level tone, corresponding generally to Middle Chinese characters that are pronounced with a voiced initial and have a flat tone.
