= Dayu Township =

Dayu Township 大禹乡
- Township
- Location in Shanxi
- Coordinates: 37°51′37″N 110°59′18″E
- Country: People's Republic of China
- Province: Shanxi
- Prefecture-level city: Lüliang
- County: Lin County
- Village-level divisions: 33 villages
- Time zone: UTC+8 (China Standard)

Dayu Township (simplified Chinese: 大禹乡; traditional Chinese: 大禹鄉; pinyin: Dàyǔ Xiāng) is a township of Lin County in western Shanxi province, China. As of 2023, it has 33 villages under its administration:

- Dayugou Village (大峪沟村)
- Houliujiazhuang Village (后刘家庄村)
- Shanqingyu Village (善庆峪村)
- Washeping Village (瓦舍坪村)
- Yaojiashan Village (姚家山村)
- Kangjiata Village (康家塔村)
- Qidao Village (歧道村)
- Fudi Village (府底村)
- Liujiageda Village (刘家圪垯村)
- Yantou Village (岩头村)
- Qianxiaoyu Village (前小峪村)
- Fotangyu Village (佛堂峪村)
- Getaishang Village (圪台上村)
- Zhangjiageda Village (张家圪垯村)
- Houdayu Village (后大禹村)
- Dahougou Village (大后沟村)
- Qiandayu Village (前大禹村)
- Shenyuta Village (神峪塔村)
- Lüjialing Village (吕家岭村)
- Dujialing Village (杜家岭村)
- Huoliaopo Village (火燎坡村)
- Xigou Village (西沟村)
- Hejiagetai Village (贺家圪台村)
- Shitigou Village (石梯沟村)
- Qinjiageleng Village (秦家圪堎村)
- Qianyangta Village (前阳塔村)
- Fanjiashan Village (樊家山村)
- Wangjiaping Village (王家坪村)
- Houxiaoyu Village (后小峪村)
- Houjiagou Village (候家沟村)
- Qianliujiazhuang Village (前刘家庄村)
- Shujiashan Village (树家山村)
- Liushuyan Village (柳树焉村)

== See also ==
- List of township-level divisions of Shanxi
