= Yanzhuang =

Yanzhuang may refer to the following locations in China:

Towns

- Yanzhuang, Henan (闫庄镇), in Song County
- Yanzhuang, Ju County (阎庄镇), Shandong
- Yanzhuang, Yuanping (闫庄镇), Shanxi
- Yanzhuang, Tianjin (沿庄镇), in Jinghai District, Tianjin
- Yanzhuang, Jinan (颜庄镇), in Gangcheng District, Jinan, Shandong

Townships

- Yanzhuang Township, Hebei (阎庄乡), in Qingyuan District, Baoding, Hebei
- Yanzhuang Township, Shanxi (闫庄镇), in Xiyang County

Subdistrict

- Yanzhuang Subdistrict (烟庄街道), Guan County, Shandong
