= Lan Prefecture (Shanxi) =

Historical administrative division in Shanxi, China

Lanzhou or Lan Prefecture (嵐州) was a zhou (prefecture) in imperial China seated in modern Lan County in Shanxi, China. It existed (intermittently) from 623 to 1369.

== Geography ==
The administrative region of Lanzhou in the Tang dynasty is in Shanxi. It probably includes parts of modern:

- Under the administration of Lüliang:
  - Lan County
  - Xing County
- Under the administration of Xinzhou:
  - Jingle County
  - Kelan County
