= Chengbei Subdistrict, Lüliang =

Chengbei Subdistrict 城北街道
- Subdistrict
- Location in Shanxi
- Coordinates: 37°31′25″N 111°09′00″E
- Country: People's Republic of China
- Province: Shanxi
- Prefecture-level city: Lüliang
- District: Lishi District
- Elevation: 944 m (3,097 ft)
- Time zone: UTC+8 (China Standard)
- Postal code: 033000
- Area code: 0358

Chengbei Subdistrict (Chinese: 城北街道; pinyin: Chéngběi Jiēdào; lit. 'city north') is a subdistrict of Lishi District, Lüliang, Shanxi, People's Republic of China, occupying the northern portion of the district as its name suggests. As of 2011, it has 13 residential communities (社区) under its administration.

== See also ==
- List of township-level divisions of Shanxi
