= Tuyu Township =

Tuyu Township 土峪乡
- Township
- Location in Shanxi
- Coordinates: 38°20′18″N 111°39′22″E
- Country: People's Republic of China
- Province: Shanxi
- Prefecture-level city: Lüliang
- County: Lan County
- Time zone: UTC+8 (China Standard)

Tuyu Township (simplified Chinese: 土峪乡; traditional Chinese: 土峪鄉; pinyin: Tǔyù Xiāng) is a township in Lan County, Lüliang, Shanxi, China. As of 2020, it has eight villages under its administration:

- Tuyu Village
- Xituyu Village (西土峪村)
- Dianshang Village (店上村)
- Qingshuihe Village (清水河村)
- Chenjiazhuang Village (陈家庄村)
- Dingziping Village (丁字坪村)
- Huqinshe Village (胡琴舍村)
- Huangqian Village (黄签村)
