= Lanzhou (disambiguation) =

Lanzhou, formerly Lanchow, is a city in Gansu, China.

Lanzhou may also refer to:

- Lan Prefecture, a historical prefecture in modern Shanxi, China
- Chinese destroyer Lanzhou (170), a Chinese People's Liberation Army Navy Type 052C destroyer commissioned in 2004
