= Huilong Township, Shanxi =

Huilong Township 回龙乡
- Township
- Location in Shanxi
- Coordinates: 36°53′40″N 111°27′30″E
- Country: People's Republic of China
- Province: Shanxi
- Prefecture-level city: Lüliang
- County: Jiaokou
- Village-level divisions: 10 villages
- Elevation: 887 m (2,910 ft)
- Time zone: UTC+8 (China Standard)
- Area code: 0358

Huilong Township (simplified Chinese: 回龙乡; traditional Chinese: 回龍鄉; pinyin: Huílóng Xiāng) is a township of Jiaokou County in southwestern Shanxi province, China, located 26 kilometres (16 mi) southeast of the county seat as the crow flies. As of 2011, it has ten villages under its administration.

== See also ==
- List of township-level divisions of Shanxi
