= Wenquan Township, Jiaokou County =

Wenquan Township 温泉乡
- Town
- Location in Shanxi
- Coordinates: 37°03′44″N 111°27′02″E
- Country: People's Republic of China
- Province: Shanxi
- Prefecture-level city: Lüliang
- County: Jiaokou
- Elevation: 1,075 m (3,527 ft)
- Time zone: UTC+8 (China Standard)

Wenquan Township (simplified Chinese: 温泉乡; traditional Chinese: 溫泉鄉; pinyin: Wēnquán Xiāng; lit. 'hot springs') is a township in Jiaokou County in western Shanxi province, China. As of 2011, it has 12 villages under its administration.

== Economy ==
In 2026, Wenquan Township began promoting out-of-town "sojourn" elderly-care stays at its regional elderly care service center. The first tour group, from Nanchang, Jiangxi, arrived on August 23, 2026.

== See also ==
- List of township-level divisions of Shanxi
