= Wenquan Township, Kelan County =

Wenquan Township 温泉乡
- Town
- Location in Shanxi
- Coordinates: 38°39′53″N 111°17′04″E
- Country: People's Republic of China
- Province: Shanxi
- Prefecture-level city: Xinzhou
- County: Kelan
- Elevation: 1,093 m (3,586 ft)
- Time zone: UTC+8 (China Standard)

Wenquan Township (simplified Chinese: 温泉乡; traditional Chinese: 溫泉鄉; pinyin: Wēnquán Xiāng; lit. 'hot springs') is a township in Kelan County in northwestern Shanxi province, China. As of 2011, it has 11 villages under its administration.

== See also ==
- List of township-level divisions of Shanxi
