= Xihuayuan Subdistrict, Datong =

Xihuayuan Subdistrict 西花园街道
- Subdistrict
- Location in Shanxi
- Coordinates: 40°2′42″N 113°13′34″E
- Country: People's Republic of China
- Province: Shanxi
- Prefecture-level city: Datong
- District: Yungang District
- Time zone: UTC+8 (China Standard)

Xihuayuan Subdistrict (simplified Chinese: 西花园街道; traditional Chinese: 西花園街道; pinyin: Xīhuāyuán Jiēdào) is a subdistrict in Yungang District, Datong, Shanxi, China. As of 2018, it has 5 residential communities under its administration.

== See also ==
- List of township-level divisions of Shanxi
