= Xiqu Subdistrict, Gujiao =

Xiqu Subdistrict 西曲街道
- Subdistrict
- Location in Shanxi
- Coordinates: 37°54′42″N 112°09′42″E
- Country: People's Republic of China
- Province: Shanxi
- Prefecture-level city: Taiyuan
- District: Gujiao
- Time zone: UTC+8 (China Standard)

Xiqu Subdistrict (Chinese: 西曲街道; pinyin: Xīqǔ Jiēdào) is a subdistrict in Gujiao, Taiyuan, Shanxi province, China. As of 2020, it has six residential neighborhoods and two villages under its administration:

Neighborhoods

- Xiqu Community
- Fanshigou Community (矾石沟社区)
- Yingbin Road Community (迎宾路社区)
- Binhebei Road Community (滨河北路社区)
- Tanshang Community (滩上社区)
- Shitanju Community (石炭咀社区)

Villages

- Gangli Village (港立村)
- Yongshuqu Village (永树曲村)

== See also ==
- List of township-level divisions of Shanxi
