= Pingtan, Shanxi =

Pingtan 平坦镇
- Town
- Location in Shanxi
- Coordinates: 37°52′9″N 113°28′23″E
- Country: People's Republic of China
- Province: Shanxi
- Prefecture-level city: Yangquan
- District: Jiaoqu (Jiao District)
- Time zone: UTC+8 (China Standard)

Pingtan (Chinese: 平坦; pinyin: Píngtǎn) is a town in Jiaoqu (Jiao District), Yangquan, Shanxi province, China. As of 2020, it has eleven villages under its administration:

- Longfenggou Village (龙凤沟村)
- Ganhe Village (甘河村)
- Taolingou Village (桃林沟村)
- Weijiayu Village (魏家峪村)
- Xinxing Village (辛兴村)
- Potou Village (坡头村)
- Sangzhang Village (桑掌村)
- Zhongzhuang Village (中庄村)
- Beinao Village (北垴村)
- Xishangzhuang Village (西上庄村)
- Houyu Village (后峪村)

== See also ==
- List of township-level divisions of Shanxi
