= Yangping Township =

Yangping Township 阳坪乡
- Township
- Location in Shanxi
- Coordinates: 38°39′22″N 111°25′13″E
- Country: People's Republic of China
- Province: Shanxi
- Prefecture-level city: Xinzhou
- County: Kelan
- Elevation: 1,224 m (4,016 ft)
- Time zone: UTC+8 (China Standard)

Yangping Township (simplified Chinese: 阳坪乡; traditional Chinese: 陽坪鄉; pinyin: Yángpíng Xiāng) is a township of Kelan County in northwestern Shanxi province, China. As of 2011, it has 13 villages under its administration.

== See also ==
- List of township-level divisions of Shanxi
