= Chengbei Subdistrict, Yongji, Shanxi =

Chengbei Subdistrict 城北街道
- Subdistrict
- Location in Shanxi
- Coordinates: 34°52′03″N 110°26′20″E
- Country: People's Republic of China
- Province: Shanxi
- Prefecture-level city: Yuncheng
- County-level city: Yongji
- Elevation: 356 m (1,168 ft)
- Time zone: UTC+8 (China Standard)
- Postal code: 044500
- Area code: 0359

Chengbei Subdistrict (Chinese: 城北街道; pinyin: Chéngběi Jiēdào; lit. 'city north') is a subdistrict of Yongji in southwestern Shanxi, People's Republic of China, occupying the northern portion of Yongji's urban area as its name suggests. As of 2011, it has 3 residential communities (社区) and 19 villages under its administration.

== See also ==
- List of township-level divisions of Shanxi
