= Lucheng, Jincheng =

Lucheng 潞城镇
- Town
- Location in Shanxi
- Coordinates: 35°41′14″N 113°17′29″E
- Country: People's Republic of China
- Province: Shanxi
- Prefecture-level city: Jincheng
- County: Lingchuan
- Village-level divisions: 44 villages
- Elevation: 1,171 m (3,842 ft)
- Time zone: UTC+8 (China Standard)
- Area code: 0356

Lucheng (Chinese: 潞城; pinyin: Lùchéng) is a town of Lingchuan County in southeastern Shanxi province, China, located 9.8 kilometres (6.1 mi) south of the county seat and about 24 km (15 mi) northwest of the border with Henan as the crow flies. As of 2011, it has 44 villages under its administration.

== See also ==
- List of township-level divisions of Shanxi
