= Gaocheng Township =

Gaocheng Township 高城乡
- Township
- Location in Shanxi
- Coordinates: 38°34′50″N 112°45′53″E
- Country: People's Republic of China
- Province: Shanxi
- Prefecture-level city: Xinzhou
- District: Xinfu
- Village-level divisions: 9 villages
- Elevation: 778 m (2,552 ft)
- Time zone: UTC+8 (China Standard)

Gaocheng (Chinese: 高城; pinyin: Gāochéng; lit. 'high city') is a township of Xinfu District, Xinzhou, Shanxi province, China, located 18 kilometres (11 mi) north of downtown Xinzhou. G55 Erenhot–Guangzhou Expressway and China National Highway 208 pass just to the west of the township. As of 2020, it has 9 villages under its administration.

- Gaocheng Village
- Jinshanpu Village (金山铺村)
- Houyuni Village (后淤泥村)
- Qianyuni Village (前淤泥村)
- Yongfengzhuang Village (永丰庄村)
- Zhang Village (张村)
- Wangfuzhuang Village (王府庄村)
- Xinkou Village (忻口村)
- Nanpu Village (南铺村)

== See also ==
- List of township-level divisions of Shanxi
