= Xinghua Subdistrict, Taiyuan =

Xinghua Subdistrict 兴华街道
- Subdistrict
- Location in Shanxi
- Coordinates: 37°53′07″N 112°30′56″E
- Country: People's Republic of China
- Province: Shanxi
- Prefecture-level city: Taiyuan
- District: Wanbailin
- Village-level divisions: 10 residential communities
- Elevation: 791 m (2,595 ft)
- Time zone: UTC+8 (China Standard)
- Postal code: 030027
- Area code: 0351

Xinghua Subdistrict (simplified Chinese: 兴华街道; traditional Chinese: 興華街道; pinyin: Xīnghuá Jiēdào) is a subdistrict of Wanbailin District, Taiyuan, Shanxi, People's Republic of China. As of 2011, it has ten residential communities (社区) under its administration.

== See also ==
- List of township-level divisions of Shanxi
