= Liucun, Shanxi =

Liucun 刘村镇
- Town
- Location in Shanxi
- Coordinates: 36°7′28″N 111°27′29″E
- Country: People's Republic of China
- Province: Shanxi
- Prefecture-level city: Linfen
- District: Yaodu District
- Time zone: UTC+8 (China Standard)

Liucun (Chinese: 刘村; pinyin: Liúcūn) is a town in Yaodu District, Linfen, Shanxi province, China. As of 2020, it has four residential neighborhoods and 31 villages under its administration:

Residential neighborhoods

- Binxi Community (滨西社区)
- Caihong Community (彩虹社区)
- Gaotie Community (高铁社区)
- Yifen Community (漪汾社区)

Villages

- Liubei Village (刘北村)
- Liunan Village (刘南村)
- Liuxi Village (刘西村)
- Yangjiazhuang Village (杨家庄村)
- Beiliu Village (北刘村)
- Gaodui Village (高堆村)
- Guanchang Village (官场村)
- Jiaquan Village (嘉泉村)
- Beilu Village (北芦村)
- Nanlu Village (南芦村)
- Mawu Village (马务村)
- Beiduan Village (北段村)
- Nanduan Village (南段村)
- Wogou Village (窝沟村)
- Bozhuang Village (泊庄村)
- Puzi Village (堡子村)
- Boduan Village (泊段村)
- Shaqiao Village (沙桥村)
- Mazhan Village (马站村)
- Jiantou Village (涧头村)
- Qiaojiayuan Village (乔家院村)
- Zhoujiazhuang Village (周家庄村)
- Taojiazhuang Village (陶家庄村)
- Fanjiazhuang Village (樊家庄村)
- Shangjianbei Village (上涧北村)
- Dongyi Village (东宜村)
- Kongjiazhuang Village (孔家庄村)
- Qingcheng Village (青城村)
- Jianshang Village (涧上村)
- Zuoyi Village (左义村)
- Wokou Village (卧口村)

== See also ==
- List of township-level divisions of Shanxi
