= Yanzhuang Township, Shanxi =

Yanzhuang Township 闫庄乡
- Township
- Location in Shanxi
- Coordinates: 37°30′47″N 113°52′35″E
- Country: People's Republic of China
- Province: Shanxi
- Prefecture-level city: Jinzhong
- County: Xiyang
- Elevation: 1,004 m (3,294 ft)
- Time zone: UTC+8 (China Standard)

Yanzhuang Township (simplified Chinese: 闫庄乡; traditional Chinese: 閆莊鄉; pinyin: Yánzhuāng Xiāng) is a township of Xiyang County in the Taihang Mountains of eastern Shanxi province, China, located 18 kilometres (11 mi) southeast of the county seat. As of 2011, it has 14 villages under its administration.

== See also ==
- List of township-level divisions of Shanxi
