= Xing County =

Coordinates: 38°27′45″N 111°07′38″E

Xing County 兴县
- County
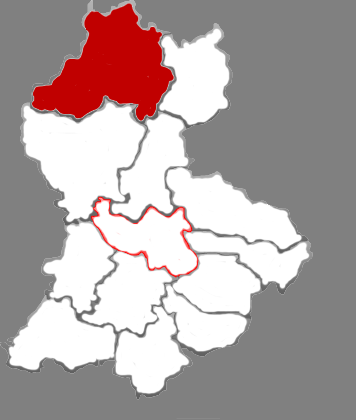
- Xing County in Lüliang

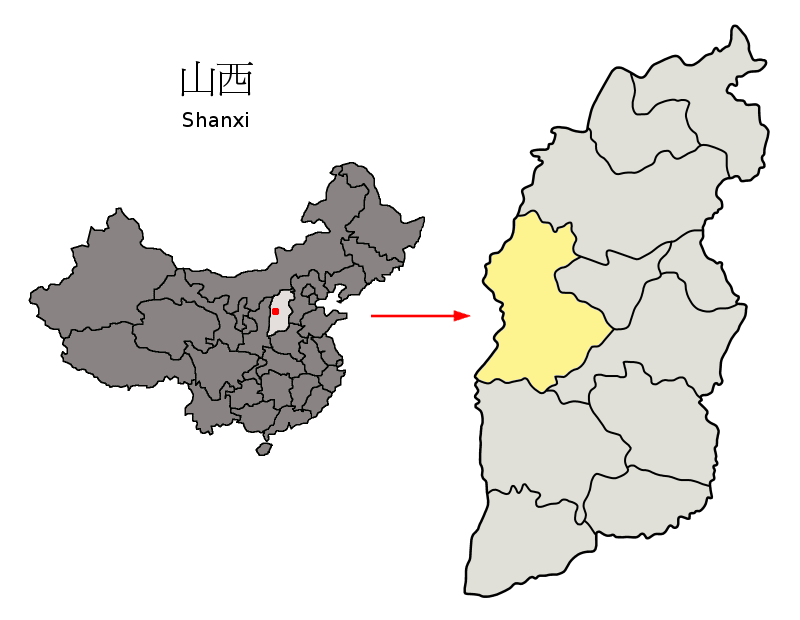
- Lüliang in Shanxi
- Country: People's Republic of China
- Province: Shanxi
- Prefecture-level city: Lüliang

Area
  - Total: 3,164 km^{2} (1,222 sq mi)

Population (2020)
  - Total: 183,484
  - Density: 57.99/km^{2} (150.2/sq mi)
- Time zone: UTC+8 (China Standard)

Xing County or Xingxian (simplified Chinese: 兴县; traditional Chinese: 興縣; pinyin: Xīng Xiàn) is a county in the west of Shanxi province, China, bordering Shaanxi province to the west across the Yellow River. It is the northernmost county-level division of the prefecture-level city of Lüliang. Xing County was formerly known as Linwei (臨蔚縣) since the Northern and Southern dynasties. Xing County was formally established in the second year of the Hongwu era (1368–1398) of the Ming dynasty.

== Climate ==
Climate data for Xingxian, elevation 1,013 m (3,323 ft), (1991–2020 normals, extremes 1981–2010)
Month	Jan	Feb	Mar	Apr	May	Jun	Jul	Aug	Sep	Oct	Nov	Dec	Year
Record high °C (°F)	11.7 (53.1)	20.1 (68.2)	28.7 (83.7)	35.7 (96.3)	35.4 (95.7)	39.9 (103.8)	39.2 (102.6)	36.1 (97.0)	35.5 (95.9)	28.5 (83.3)	23.2 (73.8)	16.6 (61.9)	39.9 (103.8)
Mean daily maximum °C (°F)	−0.9 (30.4)	4.5 (40.1)	11.8 (53.2)	19.6 (67.3)	25.3 (77.5)	29.4 (84.9)	30.6 (87.1)	28.2 (82.8)	23.4 (74.1)	16.7 (62.1)	8.4 (47.1)	0.9 (33.6)	16.5 (61.7)
Daily mean °C (°F)	−7.7 (18.1)	−2.6 (27.3)	4.4 (39.9)	12.1 (53.8)	18.0 (64.4)	22.5 (72.5)	24.1 (75.4)	22.0 (71.6)	16.7 (62.1)	9.8 (49.6)	1.8 (35.2)	−5.6 (21.9)	9.6 (49.3)
Mean daily minimum °C (°F)	−12.5 (9.5)	−7.8 (18.0)	−1.3 (29.7)	5.4 (41.7)	11.1 (52.0)	16.0 (60.8)	18.7 (65.7)	17.1 (62.8)	11.9 (53.4)	5.0 (41.0)	−2.5 (27.5)	−9.9 (14.2)	4.3 (39.7)
Record low °C (°F)	−25.5 (−13.9)	−22.6 (−8.7)	−16.6 (2.1)	−6.6 (20.1)	−2.2 (28.0)	3.7 (38.7)	10.6 (51.1)	7.7 (45.9)	−1.5 (29.3)	−9.1 (15.6)	−18.8 (−1.8)	−26.7 (−16.1)	−26.7 (−16.1)
Average precipitation mm (inches)	4.3 (0.17)	5.0 (0.20)	9.7 (0.38)	25.4 (1.00)	40.8 (1.61)	58.6 (2.31)	109.4 (4.31)	122.3 (4.81)	68.8 (2.71)	31.2 (1.23)	15.2 (0.60)	4.4 (0.17)	495.1 (19.5)
Average precipitation days (≥ 0.1 mm)	2.7	3.1	3.9	4.9	7.1	10.0	12.3	11.7	9.3	6.7	4.4	2.8	78.9
Average snowy days	3.0	3.3	2.3	0.4	0	0	0	0	0	0.2	2.1	3.0	14.3
Average relative humidity (%)	56	50	43	39	41	49	61	66	64	60	57	55	53
Mean monthly sunshine hours	172.1	176.0	214.0	233.5	257.5	235.9	226.0	214.3	201.5	204.3	179.5	172.6	2,487.2
Percentage possible sunshine	56	57	57	59	58	53	50	51	55	60	60	59	56
Source: China Meteorological Administration
