= Jieyu Township =

Jieyu Township 解峪乡
- Township
- Location in Shanxi
- Coordinates: 35°5′53″N 111°46′34″E
- Country: People's Republic of China
- Province: Shanxi
- Prefecture-level city: Yuncheng
- County: Yuanqu County
- Time zone: UTC+8 (China Standard)

Jieyu Township (simplified Chinese: 解峪乡; traditional Chinese: 解峪鄉; pinyin: Jiěyù Xiāng) is a township in Yuanqu County, Shanxi, China. As of 2020, it administers Leyao Village (乐尧村), Yuanzhong Village (原中村), and Jieyu Village.
