= Niangziguan Town =

Niangziguan 娘子关镇
- Town
- Location in Shanxi
- Coordinates: 37°57′37″N 113°52′06″E
- Country: People's Republic of China
- Province: Shanxi
- Prefecture-level city: Yangquan
- County: Pingding
- Village-level divisions: 1 residential community 24 villages
- Elevation: 379 m (1,243 ft)
- Time zone: UTC+8 (China Standard)
- Area code: 0353

Niangziguan (simplified Chinese: 娘子关; traditional Chinese: 娘子關; pinyin: Niángzǐguān) is a town located in north-east of Pingding County, Shanxi, near the location of the Niangzi Pass and the border with Hebei and situated 27 kilometres (17 mi) northeast of the county seat. The pass itself is a famous pass in the Great Wall known as the ninth pass under the heaven.

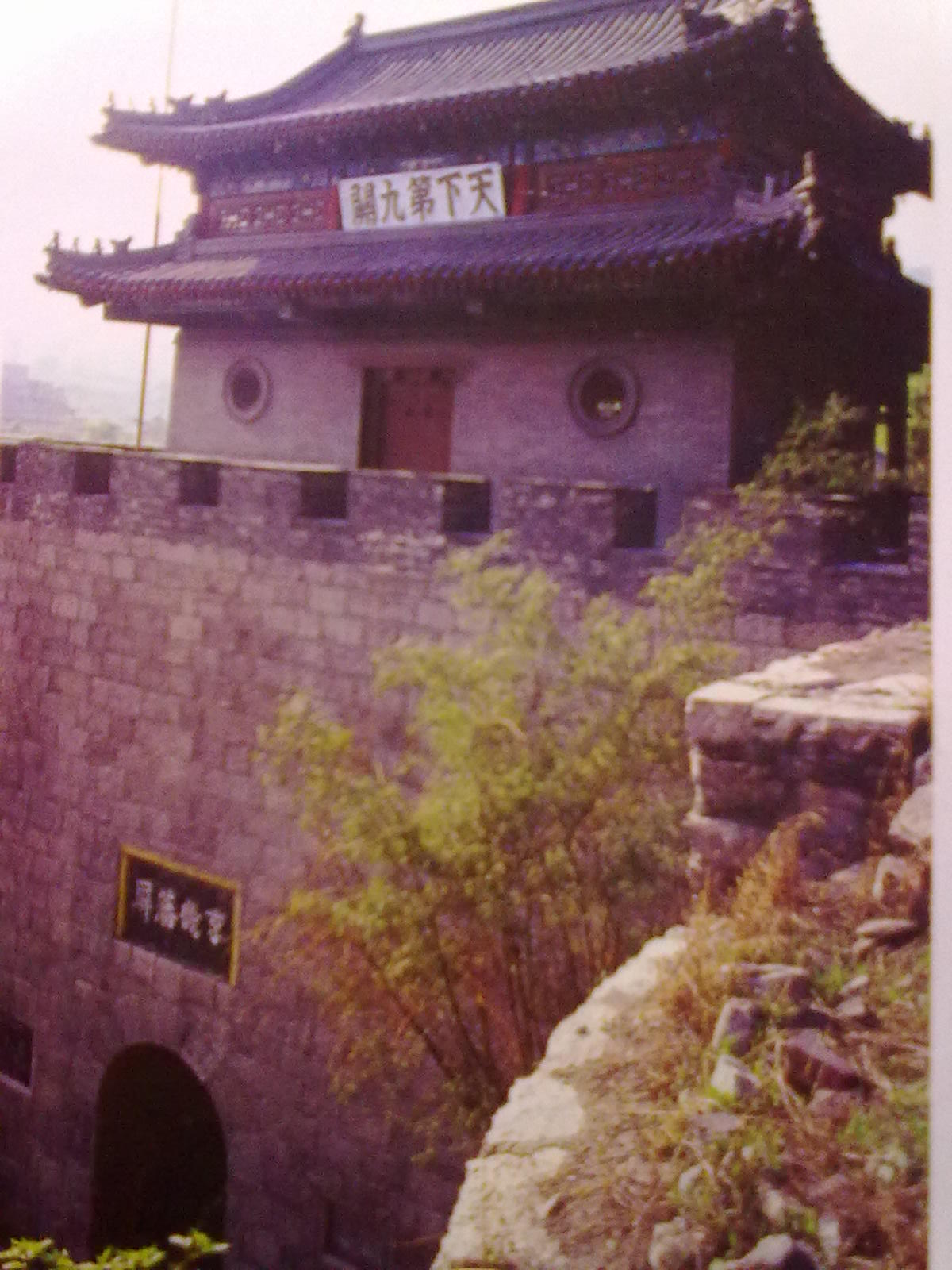

== Layout ==
Niangziguan is made up of Dakou Village (大口村), Xiaokou Village (小口村) and Niangziguan Village (娘子关村). These three villages are located end-to-end in either bank of the 2000-meter-long Mianshui River. The Niangziguan Village is also known as "Weize Village" (苇泽村), because it is located next to Mianshui River (绵水) and the bank of the river is covered with reeds.

Most of the villagers are the generations of the soldiers who migrated to guard the pass in Qing Dynasty. There is an old street in the village that begins with the eastern Wenchang Ge (文昌阁) and ends with the western Wuying Ge (武英阁) and all the street is covered with slabstones. Most of the houses are old here and one of them is conspicuous with stone lions and flagpoles etc. Local people call it Flagpole (旗杆院) and the ancestor is the Xianfeng Emperor's imperial guards and all the things are given by the emperor.

== Legend ==
There are two legends about the background of Niangziguan. The first is that Envy Girls Temple (妒女祠) is built here to commemorate Jie Zitui's sister. The other is that Li Shimin's sister-the Princess Pingyang once led Niangzijun to guard the pass, so later generations called it Niangziguan. The latter is accepted by most people and now it has become a conclusion. The vicinity of Niangziguan now also remains some legends and cites about Princess Pingyang.

== Customs ==
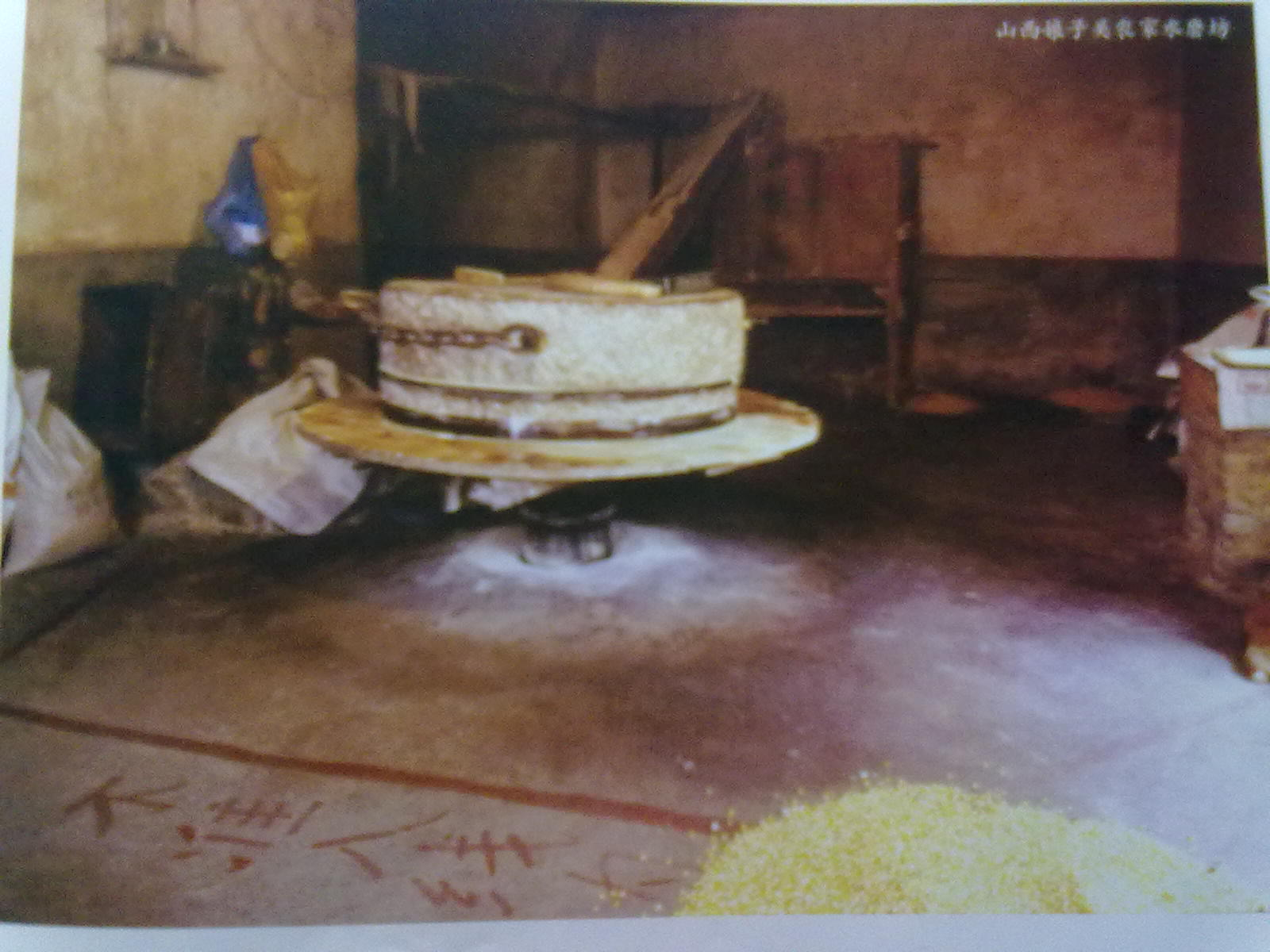
Levigation

Because the village is located alongside the bank of Mianshui River, the levigation is flourished there. The function of the levigation is to make fragrant but it does great harm to the environment so the levigation is banned by the government. It will disappear in the history.

Niangziguan is the key point to Shanxi, so there is a special custom called Horse Race (跑马). On 16 January every year, local people take their horses, asses and mules to gather in Dongzhai Village (董寨村) to circle in a 400-meter-long alley. There is no saddle on the horse, and the man who rides the horse raises his hands over his head with his legs clamping the horse. People put a lot of ashes on the street to avoid slipping as well as make the atmosphere active. The aim of the activity is to avoid disease and disaster as well as best wishes for the future.
