= Wan'an, Xinjiang County =

Wan'an 万安镇
- Town
- Location in Shanxi
- Coordinates: 35°32′22″N 111°7′33″E
- Country: People's Republic of China
- Province: Shanxi
- Prefecture-level city: Yuncheng
- County: Xinjiang County
- Time zone: UTC+8 (China Standard)

Wan'an (simplified Chinese: 万安; traditional Chinese: 萬安; pinyin: Wàn'ān) is a town under the administration of Xinjiang County, Shanxi, China. As of 2018, it has 13 villages under its administration.
