= Yanzhuang, Yuanping =

Yanzhuang 闫庄镇
- Town
- Location in Shanxi
- Coordinates: 38°37′18″N 112°36′49″E
- Country: People's Republic of China
- Province: Shanxi
- Prefecture-level city: Xinzhou
- County-level city: Yuanping
- Elevation: 838 m (2,749 ft)
- Time zone: UTC+8 (China Standard)
- Area code: 0350

Yanzhuang (simplified Chinese: 闫庄; traditional Chinese: 閆莊; pinyin: Yánzhuāng) is a town under the administration of Yuanping City in northern Shanxi province, China, located about 15 kilometres (9.3 mi) southwest of downtown Yuanping. As of 2011, it has 22 villages under its administration.

== See also ==
- List of township-level divisions of Shanxi
