= Lan County =

Lan County 岚县
- County
- Location of the seat in Shanxi
- Coordinates: 38°16′46″N 111°40′16″E
- Country: People's Republic of China
- Province: Shanxi
- Prefecture-level city: Lüliang

Population (2020)
  - Total: 148,315
- Time zone: UTC+8 (China Standard)

Lan County
- Traditional Chinese: 嵐縣
- Simplified Chinese: 岚县
Transcriptions
Standard Mandarin
- Hanyu Pinyin: Lánxiàn
- Wade–Giles: Lan Hsien

Former names

Lanzhou
- Traditional Chinese: 嵐州
- Simplified Chinese: 岚州
Transcriptions
Standard Mandarin
- Hanyu Pinyin: Lánzhōu
- Wade–Giles: Lan-chou

Lan County or Lanxian is a county under the administration of Lüliang City, in west-central Shanxi province, China.

== History ==
Lanxian was formerly the seat of Lan Prefecture, during which time it was known as Lanzhou.

== Climate ==
Climate data for Lanxian, elevation 1,221 m (4,006 ft), (1991–2020 normals, extremes 1981–2010)
Month	Jan	Feb	Mar	Apr	May	Jun	Jul	Aug	Sep	Oct	Nov	Dec	Year
Record high °C (°F)	11.6 (52.9)	21.3 (70.3)	25.6 (78.1)	34.3 (93.7)	34.1 (93.4)	39.3 (102.7)	37.7 (99.9)	35.4 (95.7)	34.8 (94.6)	27.7 (81.9)	22.9 (73.2)	14.4 (57.9)	39.3 (102.7)
Mean daily maximum °C (°F)	0.4 (32.7)	4.5 (40.1)	11.0 (51.8)	18.5 (65.3)	24.0 (75.2)	27.8 (82.0)	28.5 (83.3)	26.4 (79.5)	22.1 (71.8)	16.1 (61.0)	8.2 (46.8)	1.5 (34.7)	15.7 (60.4)
Daily mean °C (°F)	−8.9 (16.0)	−4.6 (23.7)	2.1 (35.8)	9.4 (48.9)	15.5 (59.9)	19.7 (67.5)	21.4 (70.5)	19.3 (66.7)	13.9 (57.0)	7.4 (45.3)	−0.3 (31.5)	−7.0 (19.4)	7.3 (45.2)
Mean daily minimum °C (°F)	−16.1 (3.0)	−11.8 (10.8)	−5.3 (22.5)	1.1 (34.0)	6.8 (44.2)	11.8 (53.2)	15.3 (59.5)	13.6 (56.5)	7.6 (45.7)	0.7 (33.3)	−6.4 (20.5)	−13.4 (7.9)	0.3 (32.6)
Record low °C (°F)	−30.6 (−23.1)	−27.6 (−17.7)	−20.7 (−5.3)	−11.1 (12.0)	−4.6 (23.7)	2.0 (35.6)	6.5 (43.7)	3.8 (38.8)	−5.7 (21.7)	−11.1 (12.0)	−23.4 (−10.1)	−33.0 (−27.4)	−33.0 (−27.4)
Average precipitation mm (inches)	2.8 (0.11)	5.3 (0.21)	11.0 (0.43)	26.9 (1.06)	38.5 (1.52)	61.4 (2.42)	105.4 (4.15)	113.8 (4.48)	69.3 (2.73)	32.0 (1.26)	13.7 (0.54)	2.7 (0.11)	482.8 (19.02)
Average precipitation days (≥ 0.1 mm)	2.0	3.0	4.4	5.5	7.1	10.7	13.0	12.3	10.1	6.2	4.0	2.0	80.3
Average snowy days	3.0	4.2	3.7	1.3	0	0	0	0	0	0.2	3.3	3.0	18.7
Average relative humidity (%)	54	50	47	46	48	58	72	78	76	67	61	54	59
Mean monthly sunshine hours	206.0	200.2	242.2	255.0	276.8	249.6	229.5	216.5	201.9	213.1	199.6	202.3	2,692.7
Percentage possible sunshine	67	65	65	64	63	56	51	52	55	62	67	69	61
Source: China Meteorological Administration
