= Xiangyang, Shanxi =

Xiangyang 向阳镇
- Town
- Location in Shanxi
- Coordinates: 37.9922°N 112.5114°E
- Country: People's Republic of China
- Province: Shanxi
- Prefecture-level city: Taiyuan
- District: Jiancaoping District
- Time zone: UTC+8 (China Standard)

Xiangyang (Chinese: 向阳) is a town of Jiancaoping District, Taiyuan, Shanxi, China. As of 2018, it has one residential community and 11 villages under its administration.
