= Wangcun Township, Shanxi =

Wangcun Township 王村乡
- Township
- Location in Shanxi
- Coordinates: 38°23′33″N 111°51′55″E
- Country: People's Republic of China
- Province: Shanxi
- Prefecture-level city: Xinzhou
- County: Jingle
- Elevation: 1,296 m (4,252 ft)
- Time zone: UTC+8 (China Standard)

Wangcun (Chinese: 王村; pinyin: Wángcūn) is a township in Jingle County in northwestern province Shanxi province, located 7 kilometres (4.3 mi) west of the county seat. As of 2011, it has 35 villages under its administration.

== See also ==
- List of township-level divisions of Shanxi
