= Yunzhu =

Yunzhu is a Chinese name.

== People with the name ==
- Cao Yunzhu (born 2003), Chinese trampolinist
- Shangguan Yunzhu (1920–1968), Chinese actress

== See also ==
- Yun Zhu
