= Ximo =

Ximo is a common Spanish name or nickname which is a shortening of Joaquín, and may refer to:

- Ximo Enguix, a Spanish retired footballer
- Ximo Forner, a Spanish footballer
- Ximo Miralles, a Spanish footballer
- Joaquín Navarro Jiménez, known as Ximo Navarro, a Spanish footballer
- Ximo Navarro, a Spanish footballer
- Ximo Puig, a Spanish politician
- Ximo Tebar, a Spanish musician
