= Wangcun, Sichuan =

Wangcun 王村镇
- Town
- Location in Sichuan
- Coordinates: 29°29′14″N 103°56′21″E
- Country: People's Republic of China
- Province: Sichuan
- Prefecture-level city: Leshan
- County: Jingyan
- Elevation: 362 m (1,188 ft)
- Time zone: UTC+8 (China Standard)

Wangcun (Chinese: 王村; pinyin: Wángcūn) is a town in Jingyan County in southern Sichuan province, China, located 18 kilometres (11 mi) east-southeast of downtown Leshan and 22 km (14 mi) southwest of the county seat and served by China National Highway 213. As of 2011, it has one residential community (社区) and 12 villages under its administration.

== See also ==
- List of township-level divisions of Sichuan
