= Shijiazhuang, Shanxi =

Shijiazhuang 石家庄镇
- Town
- Location in Shanxi
- Coordinates: 38°34′31″N 112°1′3″E
- Country: People's Republic of China
- Province: Shanxi
- Prefecture-level city: Xinzhou
- County: Ningwu County
- Time zone: UTC+8 (China Standard)

Shijiazhuang (Chinese: 石家庄) is a town under the administration of Ningwu County, Xinzhou, Shanxi, China. As of 2018, it has nine villages under its administration.
