= Wangcun Subdistrict =

Wangcun Subdistrict 王村街道
- Subdistrict
- Location in Shanxi
- Coordinates: 39°56′11″N 112°54′14″E
- Country: People's Republic of China
- Province: Shanxi
- Prefecture-level city: Datong
- District: Mining
- Elevation: 1,540 m (5,050 ft)
- Time zone: UTC+8 (China Standard)

Wangcun Subdistrict (Chinese: 王村街道; pinyin: Wángcūn Jiēdào) is a subdistrict in Kuangqu, Datong, Shanxi province, China, located more than 35 kilometres (22 mi) southwest of downtown Datong. As of 2011, it has 3 residential communities (社区) under its administration.

== See also ==
- List of township-level divisions of Shanxi
