= Wangcun, Xiangyuan County =

Wangcun 王村镇
- Town
- Location in Shanxi
- Coordinates: 36°39′47″N 112°56′27″E
- Country: People's Republic of China
- Province: Shanxi
- Prefecture-level city: Changzhi
- County: Xiangyuan
- Elevation: 997 m (3,271 ft)
- Time zone: UTC+8 (China Standard)

Wangcun (Chinese: 王村; pinyin: Wángcūn) is a town in Xiangyuan County in southeastern Shanxi province, China, located 17 kilometres (11 mi) northwest of the county seat and served by G55 Erenhot–Guangzhou Expressway. As of 2011, it has 27 villages under its administration.

== See also ==
- List of township-level divisions of Shanxi
