= Wanquan Township, Shanxi =

Wanquan Township 万泉乡
- Township
- Location in Shanxi
- Coordinates: 35°21′44″N 110°48′0″E
- Country: People's Republic of China
- Province: Shanxi
- Prefecture-level city: Yuncheng
- County: Wanrong County
- Time zone: UTC+8 (China Standard)

Wanquan Township (simplified Chinese: 万泉乡; traditional Chinese: 萬泉鄉; pinyin: Wànquán Xiāng) is a township under the administration of Wanrong County, Shanxi, China. As of 2018, it has 15 villages under its administration.
