= Xima Township, Shanxi =

Xima Township 西马乡
- Township
- Location in Shanxi
- Coordinates: 37°8′15″N 112°56′17″E
- Country: People's Republic of China
- Province: Shanxi
- Prefecture-level city: Jinzhong
- County: Yushe County
- Time zone: UTC+8 (China Standard)

Xima Township (simplified Chinese: 西马乡; traditional Chinese: 西馬鄉; pinyin: Xīmǎ Xiāng) is a township under the administration of Yushe County, Shanxi, China. As of 2018, it has 28 villages under its administration.
