= Yuquan, Shanxi =

Yuquan 玉泉镇
- Town
- Location in Shanxi
- Coordinates: 40°25′13″N 114°5′11″E
- Country: People's Republic of China
- Province: Shanxi
- Prefecture-level city: Datong
- County: Tianzhen County
- Time zone: UTC+8 (China Standard)

Yuquan (Chinese: 玉泉; pinyin: Yùquán) is a town in Tianzhen County, Shanxi province, China. As of 2020, it administers the following 12 residential neighborhoods and 12 villages:

Neighborhoods

- Xingfuli Community (幸福里社区)
- Hepingli Community (和平里社区)
- Ping'anli Community (平安里社区)
- Dongfengli Community (东风里社区)
- Tuanjieli Community (团结里社区)
- Chaoyangli Community (朝阳里社区)
- Qianjinli Community (前进里社区)
- Nanyuanli Community (南园里社区)
- Xinhuali Community (新华里社区)
- Yingbinli Community (迎宾里社区)
- Guangmingli Community (光明里社区)
- Wangjiale Yiminxinqu Community (万家乐移民新区社区)

Villages

- Dongbeijie Village (东北街村)
- Xinanjie Village (西南街村)
- Xibeijie Village (西北街村)
- Dongnanjie Village (东南街村)
- Nanyuanzi Village (南园子村)
- Tangbali Village (唐八里村)
- Sanlitun Village (三里屯村)
- Hutuodian Village (滹沱店村)
- Shijiazhuang Village (石家庄村)
- Gejiatun Village (葛家屯村)
- Baojiatun Village (鲍家屯村)
- Lijiazhuang Village (李家庄村)
