= Shanhe, Shanxi =

Shanhe 山河镇
- Town
- Location in Shanxi
- Coordinates: 35°19′36″N 112°46′5″E
- Country: People's Republic of China
- Province: Shanxi
- Prefecture-level city: Jincheng
- County: Zezhou County
- Time zone: UTC+8 (China Standard)

Shanhe (Chinese: 山河; pinyin: Shānhé) is a town under the administration of Zezhou County, Shanxi, China. As of 2018, it has 52 villages under its administration.
