= Lin County, Shanxi =

Lin County 临县
- County
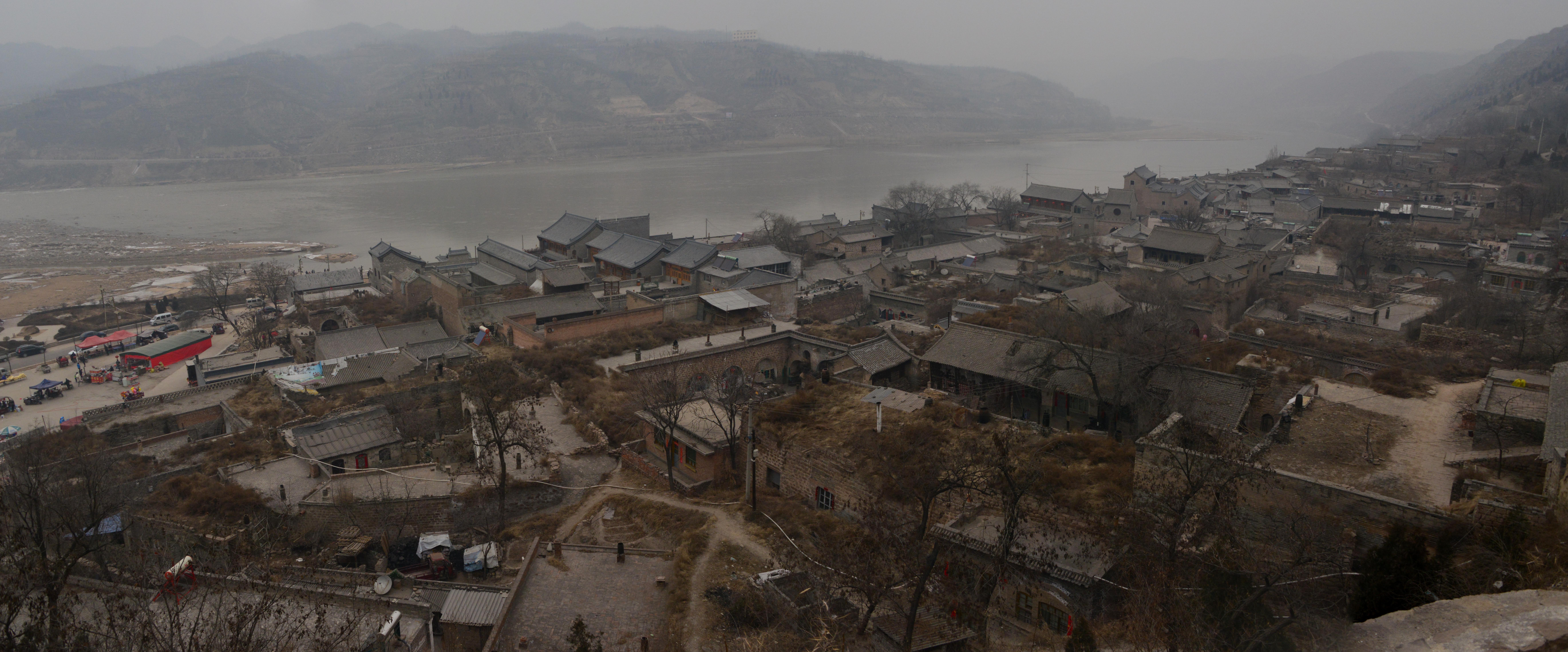
- The town of Qikou

- Location of the seat in Shanxi
- Coordinates: 37°58′N 110°57′E
- Country: People's Republic of China
- Province: Shanxi
- Prefecture-level city: Lüliang

Population (2020)
  - Total: 394,713
- Time zone: UTC+8 (China Standard)

Lin County or Linxian (simplified Chinese: 临县; traditional Chinese: 臨縣; pinyin: Lín Xiàn) is a county in the west of Shanxi province, China, bordering Shaanxi province to the west. It is under the administration of Lüliang city.

== Climate ==
Climate data for Linxian, elevation 1,163 m (3,816 ft), (1991–2020 normals, extremes 1981–2010)
Month	Jan	Feb	Mar	Apr	May	Jun	Jul	Aug	Sep	Oct	Nov	Dec	Year
Record high °C (°F)	12.4 (54.3)	19.6 (67.3)	27.6 (81.7)	35.6 (96.1)	34.2 (93.6)	39.5 (103.1)	37.4 (99.3)	35.0 (95.0)	34.7 (94.5)	27.3 (81.1)	22.0 (71.6)	14.4 (57.9)	39.5 (103.1)
Mean daily maximum °C (°F)	−0.7 (30.7)	4.1 (39.4)	11.1 (52.0)	18.9 (66.0)	24.3 (75.7)	28.3 (82.9)	29.3 (84.7)	27.1 (80.8)	22.3 (72.1)	16.0 (60.8)	8.0 (46.4)	0.7 (33.3)	15.8 (60.4)
Daily mean °C (°F)	−6.6 (20.1)	−2.1 (28.2)	4.6 (40.3)	11.9 (53.4)	17.4 (63.3)	21.7 (71.1)	23.2 (73.8)	21.2 (70.2)	16.3 (61.3)	9.9 (49.8)	2.2 (36.0)	−5.0 (23.0)	9.6 (49.2)
Mean daily minimum °C (°F)	−11.1 (12.0)	−6.9 (19.6)	−0.9 (30.4)	5.7 (42.3)	11.1 (52.0)	15.8 (60.4)	18.1 (64.6)	16.5 (61.7)	11.4 (52.5)	5.0 (41.0)	−2.3 (27.9)	−9.2 (15.4)	4.4 (40.0)
Record low °C (°F)	−24.0 (−11.2)	−21.1 (−6.0)	−17.7 (0.1)	−6.9 (19.6)	0.5 (32.9)	4.8 (40.6)	11.1 (52.0)	8.1 (46.6)	−0.5 (31.1)	−9.5 (14.9)	−20.0 (−4.0)	−24.8 (−12.6)	−24.8 (−12.6)
Average precipitation mm (inches)	4.4 (0.17)	6.6 (0.26)	12.4 (0.49)	26.0 (1.02)	38.0 (1.50)	62.3 (2.45)	122.3 (4.81)	124.1 (4.89)	78.2 (3.08)	36.6 (1.44)	16.7 (0.66)	4.1 (0.16)	531.7 (20.93)
Average precipitation days (≥ 0.1 mm)	2.7	3.2	4.4	5.4	7.1	9.3	12.0	11.4	9.7	6.5	4.1	2.5	78.3
Average snowy days	3.6	3.8	2.7	0.5	0	0	0	0	0	0.2	2.4	3.0	16.2
Average relative humidity (%)	48	44	38	37	41	50	64	69	67	59	54	50	52
Mean monthly sunshine hours	193.1	185.0	221.5	243.1	272.7	255.6	241.3	227.2	205.4	209.1	187.5	191.4	2,632.9
Percentage possible sunshine	63	60	59	61	62	58	54	55	56	61	62	65	60
Source: China Meteorological Administration
