= Suzhuang Township =

Suzhuang Township 苏庄乡
- Township
- Location in Shanxi
- Coordinates: 35°51′17″N 112°22′3″E
- Country: People's Republic of China
- Province: Shanxi
- Prefecture-level city: Jincheng
- County: Qinshui County
- Time zone: UTC+8 (China Standard)

Suzhuang Township (simplified Chinese: 苏庄乡; traditional Chinese: 蘇莊鄉; pinyin: Sūzhuāng Xiāng) is a township under the administration of Qinshui County, Shanxi, China. As of 2020, it has five villages under its administration:

- Suzhuang Village
- Gudui Village (古堆村)
- Guanting Village (官亭村)
- Dongjiashan Village (董家山村)
- Dangchuzhuang Village (当处庄村)
