= Lishi District =

Lishi 离石区 Lishih
- District
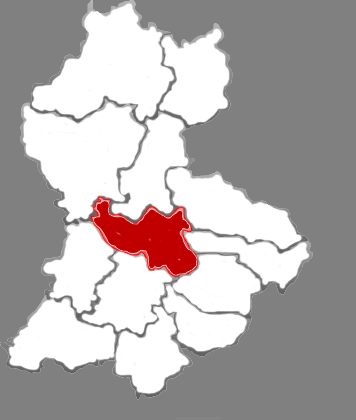
- Lishi in Lüliang

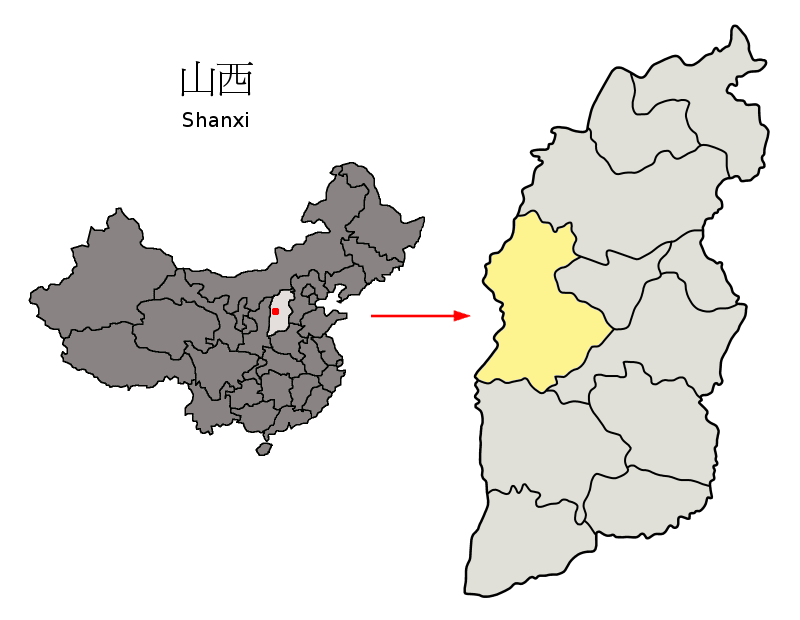
- Lüliang in Shanxi
- Coordinates: 37°31′03″N 111°09′03″E
- Country: People's Republic of China
- Province: Shanxi
- Prefecture-level city: Lüliang

Population (2020)
  - Total: 456,355
- Time zone: UTC+8 (China Standard)

Lishi District (simplified Chinese: 离石区; traditional Chinese: 離石區; pinyin: Líshí Qū) is the only district and the seat of the city of Lüliang, Shanxi province, China. The district is a major hub for the coal industry in Lüliang and an administrative center for the prefecture.

== Education ==
Lüliang Higher College is a government sponsored teacher's college that offers degrees from Taiyuan Normal University. Lüliang Higher College is seeking accreditation as an independent degree-granting institution. It has three campuses. Lüliang Higher College is generally welcoming of European, North American and African native speakers of English, along with native speakers of Japanese for employment options in their foreign language department.

Lüliang Higher College has had persistent problems maintaining electric power but has been making sincere efforts to modernize.

== Tourist attractions ==
Major sites near Lishi District include:

- Anguo Temple
- North Wudang Mountain
