= Kelan County =

Kelan County 岢岚县 Kolan
- County
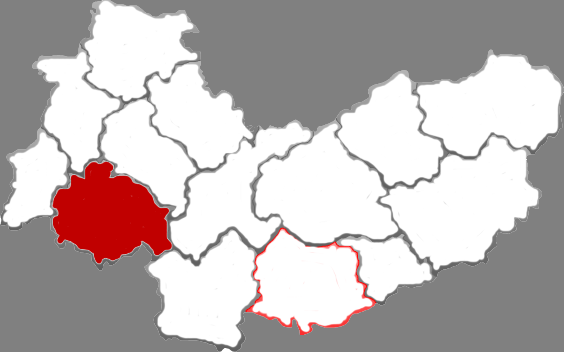
- Location in Xinzhou

- Location of the seat in Shanxi
- Coordinates: 38°44′41″N 111°34′45″E
- Country: People's Republic of China
- Province: Shanxi
- Prefecture-level city: Xinzhou

Area
  - Total: 1,984 km^{2} (766 sq mi)

Population
  - Total: 80,000
  - Density: 40/km^{2} (100/sq mi)
- Time zone: UTC+8 (China Standard)
- Postal code: 036300
- Area code: 0350

Kelan County (simplified Chinese: 岢岚县; traditional Chinese: 岢嵐縣; pinyin: Kělán Xiàn) is a county in Xinzhou Prefecture, in the northwest of Shanxi Province, China. The Taiyuan Satellite Launch Center is located in this county. The county government is located in Lanyi town.

== Climate ==
Climate data for Kelan, elevation 1,397 m (4,583 ft), (1991–2020 normals, extremes 1981–2010)
| Month | Jan | Feb | Mar | Apr | May | Jun | Jul | Aug | Sep | Oct | Nov | Dec | Year |
|---|---|---|---|---|---|---|---|---|---|---|---|---|---|
| Record high °C (°F) | 13.4 (56.1) | 18.4 (65.1) | 26.7 (80.1) | 31.9 (89.4) | 31.8 (89.2) | 37.3 (99.1) | 36.2 (97.2) | 32.8 (91.0) | 33.0 (91.4) | 25.9 (78.6) | 20.9 (69.6) | 15.0 (59.0) | 37.3 (99.1) |
| Mean daily maximum °C (°F) | −1.7 (28.9) | 2.3 (36.1) | 8.7 (47.7) | 16.2 (61.2) | 21.9 (71.4) | 25.9 (78.6) | 27.1 (80.8) | 25.2 (77.4) | 20.7 (69.3) | 14.3 (57.7) | 6.5 (43.7) | −0.6 (30.9) | 13.9 (57.0) |
| Daily mean °C (°F) | −9.9 (14.2) | −5.5 (22.1) | 1.3 (34.3) | 8.7 (47.7) | 14.8 (58.6) | 19.2 (66.6) | 21.1 (70.0) | 19.2 (66.6) | 13.9 (57.0) | 7.0 (44.6) | −0.9 (30.4) | −8.3 (17.1) | 6.7 (44.1) |
| Mean daily minimum °C (°F) | −16.2 (2.8) | −11.8 (10.8) | −5.0 (23.0) | 1.7 (35.1) | 7.6 (45.7) | 12.7 (54.9) | 15.8 (60.4) | 14.1 (57.4) | 8.4 (47.1) | 1.3 (34.3) | −6.4 (20.5) | −14.1 (6.6) | 0.7 (33.2) |
| Record low °C (°F) | −29.1 (−20.4) | −27.6 (−17.7) | −20.9 (−5.6) | −11.7 (10.9) | −3.7 (25.3) | 0.1 (32.2) | 6.0 (42.8) | 4.5 (40.1) | −4.4 (24.1) | −12.0 (10.4) | −23.8 (−10.8) | −30.7 (−23.3) | −30.7 (−23.3) |
| Average precipitation mm (inches) | 2.1 (0.08) | 3.6 (0.14) | 7.8 (0.31) | 23.5 (0.93) | 37.8 (1.49) | 62.1 (2.44) | 114.8 (4.52) | 114.7 (4.52) | 61.0 (2.40) | 30.1 (1.19) | 10.7 (0.42) | 2.6 (0.10) | 470.8 (18.54) |
| Average precipitation days (≥ 0.1 mm) | 3.0 | 3.4 | 4.1 | 5.1 | 7.6 | 10.6 | 13.5 | 12.4 | 10.4 | 6.9 | 4.6 | 3.2 | 84.8 |
| Average snowy days | 5.4 | 5.7 | 5.6 | 2.2 | 0.2 | 0 | 0 | 0 | 0.1 | 1.1 | 4.6 | 5.4 | 30.3 |
| Average relative humidity (%) | 54 | 50 | 43 | 40 | 42 | 50 | 63 | 67 | 65 | 60 | 57 | 55 | 54 |
| Mean monthly sunshine hours | 202.8 | 197.1 | 235.9 | 253.4 | 278.7 | 256.4 | 243.1 | 230.5 | 216.1 | 220.2 | 200.4 | 194.0 | 2,728.6 |
| Percentage possible sunshine | 66 | 64 | 63 | 64 | 63 | 58 | 54 | 55 | 59 | 64 | 67 | 66 | 62 |
Source: China Meteorological Administration

== Transportation ==
- Xinbao Expressway
- Railway between Kelan and Taiyuan
- China National Highway 209
