= Lüliang =

Lüliang 吕梁市 Lvliang, Lyuliang
- Prefecture-level city
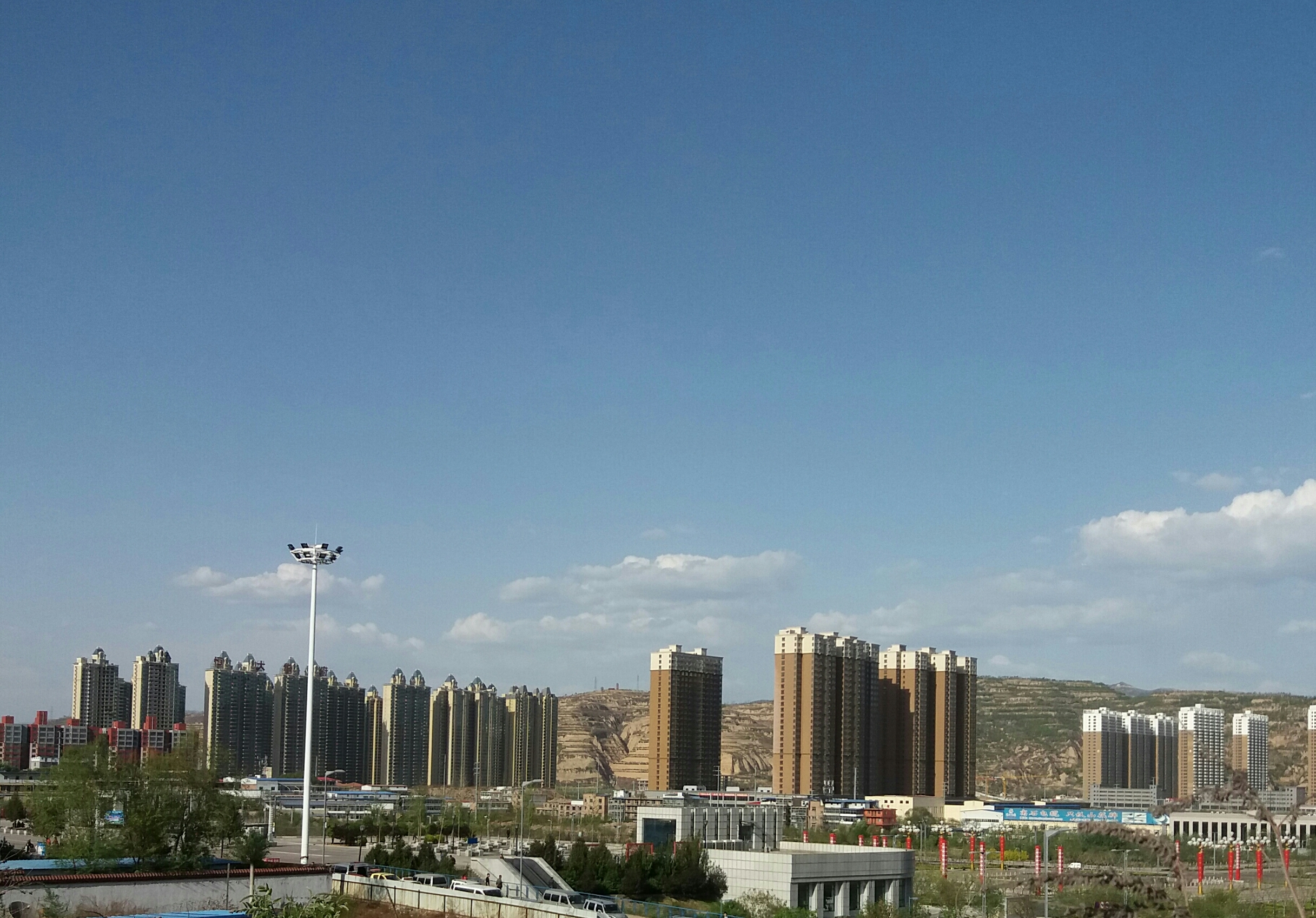

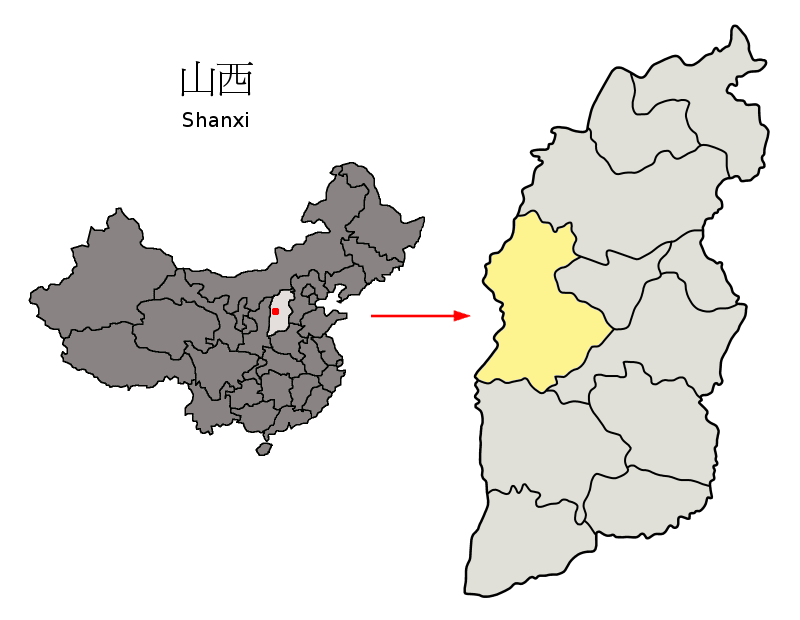
- Location of Lüliang City jurisdiction in Shanxi

- Location of the city centre in Shanxi
- Coordinates (Lüliang municipal government): 37°31′08″N 111°08′40″E
- Country: People's Republic of China
- Province: Shanxi
- County-level divisions: 1 District; 2 county-level cities 10 counties
- Municipal seat: Lishi District

Government
  - Type: Prefecture-level city
  - CPC Secretary: Sun Dajun (孙大军)
  - Mayor: Xiong Yizhi (熊义志) (Acting)

Area
  - Prefecture-level city: 21,143 km^{2} (8,163 sq mi)
  - Urban: 1,323 km^{2} (511 sq mi)
  - Metro: 1,323 km^{2} (511 sq mi)
- Elevation: 952 m (3,123 ft)

Population (2020 census)
  - Prefecture-level city: 3,398,431
  - Density: 160.74/km^{2} (416.30/sq mi)
  - Urban: 456,355
  - Urban density: 344.9/km^{2} (893.4/sq mi)
  - Metro: 456,355
  - Metro density: 344.9/km^{2} (893.4/sq mi)

GDP
  - Prefecture-level city: CN¥ 153.8 billion US$ 24.2 billion
  - Per capita: CN¥ 45,256; US$ 7,241
- Time zone: UTC+8 (China Standard)
- Postal code: 033000
- Area code: 0358
- ISO 3166 code: CN-SX-11
- Licence plates: 晋J
- Administrative division code: 141100
- Website: www.lvliang.gov.cn

Lüliang (simplified Chinese: 吕梁; traditional Chinese: 呂梁; pinyin: Lǚliáng), also spelled as Lvliang or Lyuliang, is a prefecture-level city in western Shanxi province, People's Republic of China. It borders Shaanxi province across the Yellow River to the west, Jinzhong and the provincial capital of Taiyuan to the east, Linfen to the south, and Xinzhou to the north. It has a total area of 21,143 square kilometres (8,163 sq mi) and a total population of 3,398,431 inhabitants according to the 2020 Chinese census, of whom 456,355 lived in the Lishi District metropolitan or built-up area.

== History ==
Originally organized by the People's Republic of China as the Jinsui Border Region, the region was sparsely populated in the early 20th century. However, the discovery of coal, iron, and aluminum deposits incentivized economic investment and population growth in the region. In May 1971, Lüliang was established as a prefecture-level area, and the area was reformed into a prefecture-level city in July 2004.

In 2010, the city had a GDP growth rate of 21%; at the time, prices for coal were high and the city had an active coal industry. There were plans to build a new business district in Lüliang, strongly supported by then-mayor Zhang Zhongsheng. However, in 2014, the GDP declined by 2%, and by 2015, due to a slowing economy, developing plans in Lüliang stalled and many apartment blocks were left unoccupied. Zhang lost his job due to corruption in 2015, and was sentenced to death in 2021 on bribery charges, with a 2-year reprieve.

The Chinese-American reproductive biologist Min Chueh Chang was born in Lüliang in 1908.

== Administration ==
Lüliang has direct jurisdiction over 1 district, 2 county-level cities, and 10 counties:

Map
#	Name	Hanzi	Hanyu Pinyin	Population (2010 census)	Area (km^{2})	Density (/km^{2})
1	Lishi District	离石区	Líshí Qū	320,142	1,323	242
2	Xiaoyi City	孝义市	Xiàoyì Shì	468,770	934	502
3	Fenyang City	汾阳市	Fényáng Shì	416,212	1,173	355
4	Wenshui County	文水县	Wénshuǐ Xiàn	421,199	1,069	394
5	Zhongyang County	中阳县	Zhōngyáng Xiàn	141,374	1,435	98
6	Xing County	兴县	Xīng Xiàn	279,373	3,164	88
7	Lin County	临县	Lín Xiàn	579,077	2,979	194
8	Fangshan County	方山县	Fāngshān Xiàn	143,809	1,433	100
9	Liulin County	柳林县	Liǔlín Xiàn	320,676	1,288	249
10	Lan County	岚县	Lán Xiàn	174,182	1,509	115
11	Jiaokou County	交口县	Jiāokǒu Xiàn	119,918	1,258	95
12	Jiaocheng County	交城县	Jiāochéng Xiàn	230,521	1,821	126
13	Shilou County	石楼县	Shílóu Xiàn	111,815	1,736	64

== Climate ==
Lüliang has a monsoon-influenced continental climate, that, under the Köppen climate classification, falls on the borderline between the semi-arid (Köppen BSk) and humid continental (Dwa) regimes, and features large diurnal temperature variation. Winters are cold and very dry, while summers are hot and slightly humid. The monthly daily average temperature ranges from −7.0 °C (19.4 °F) in January to 23.7 °C (74.7 °F) in July, while the annual mean is 9.5 °C (49.1 °F). Close to three-fourths of the annual precipitation occurs from June to September.

Climate data for Lüliang (Lishi District), elevation 951 m (3,120 ft), (1991–2020 normals, extremes 1971–2010)
Month	Jan	Feb	Mar	Apr	May	Jun	Jul	Aug	Sep	Oct	Nov	Dec	Year
Record high °C (°F)	15.0 (59.0)	22.7 (72.9)	29.8 (85.6)	35.5 (95.9)	36.7 (98.1)	40.6 (105.1)	39.8 (103.6)	37.2 (99.0)	36.2 (97.2)	29.4 (84.9)	24.1 (75.4)	16.7 (62.1)	40.6 (105.1)
Mean daily maximum °C (°F)	0.7 (33.3)	5.7 (42.3)	12.6 (54.7)	20.1 (68.2)	25.6 (78.1)	29.6 (85.3)	30.6 (87.1)	28.5 (83.3)	23.6 (74.5)	17.2 (63.0)	9.4 (48.9)	2.1 (35.8)	17.1 (62.9)
Daily mean °C (°F)	−6.2 (20.8)	−1.5 (29.3)	5.2 (41.4)	12.5 (54.5)	18.2 (64.8)	22.5 (72.5)	24.1 (75.4)	22.2 (72.0)	16.9 (62.4)	10.0 (50.0)	2.5 (36.5)	−4.5 (23.9)	10.2 (50.3)
Mean daily minimum °C (°F)	−11.4 (11.5)	−7.0 (19.4)	−0.8 (30.6)	5.6 (42.1)	11.1 (52.0)	15.9 (60.6)	18.7 (65.7)	17.2 (63.0)	11.7 (53.1)	4.7 (40.5)	−2.4 (27.7)	−9.2 (15.4)	4.5 (40.1)
Record low °C (°F)	−26.0 (−14.8)	−23.9 (−11.0)	−16.1 (3.0)	−9.6 (14.7)	−3.2 (26.2)	4.2 (39.6)	10.2 (50.4)	6.6 (43.9)	−2.0 (28.4)	−8.7 (16.3)	−20.0 (−4.0)	−24.9 (−12.8)	−26.0 (−14.8)
Average precipitation mm (inches)	2.8 (0.11)	6.0 (0.24)	11.9 (0.47)	26.4 (1.04)	35.7 (1.41)	52.1 (2.05)	110.6 (4.35)	115.1 (4.53)	72.7 (2.86)	36.1 (1.42)	16.7 (0.66)	2.8 (0.11)	488.9 (19.25)
Average precipitation days (≥ 0.1 mm)	2.5	3.1	4.0	5.7	6.7	8.5	12	11.4	9.0	6.7	4.5	2.2	76.3
Average snowy days	3.2	3.5	2.1	0.4	0	0	0	0	0	0.2	2.0	3.3	14.7
Average relative humidity (%)	55	51	45	42	44	52	65	70	70	66	61	56	56
Mean monthly sunshine hours	168.3	162.8	202.7	228.7	249.9	230.0	214.1	205.1	190.7	189.9	174.9	168.2	2,385.3
Percentage possible sunshine	55	53	54	58	57	52	48	49	52	55	58	57	54
Source 1: China Meteorological Administration
Source 2: Weather China

== Transportation ==
- China National Highway 209
- Lüliang Dawu Airport
- Taiyuan-Zhongwei-Yinchuan Railway
