= Yanji No.1 Senior High School =

- 延吉市第一高级中学
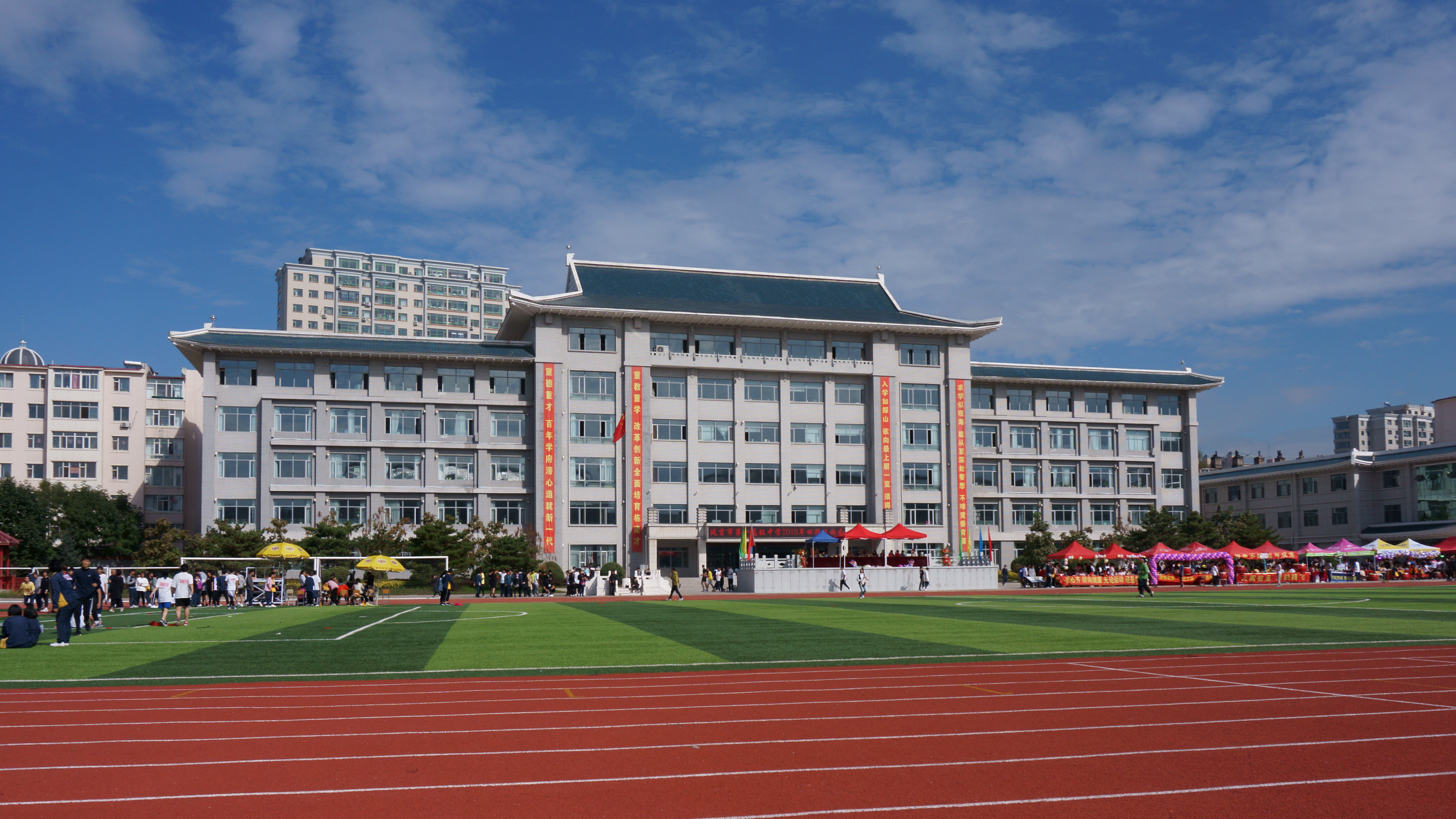
- Main teaching building

Location
- 1033 Tuanjie Road; Yanji, Yanbian, Jilin; China
- Coordinates: 42.9079°N 129.5116°E

Information
- Other name: Yanji Shi Yizhong (Chinese: 延吉市一中)
- Type: Senior high school
- Established: 1915
- Principal: Zhuang Dewu
- Enrollment: Approx. 2000; 672 per year

Yanji No.1 Senior High School (Chinese: 延吉市第一高级中学; pinyin: Yánjí shì dìyī gāojí zhōngxué), commonly abbreviated as Yanji Shi Yizhong (Chinese: 延吉市一中), is a Provincial Key High School in Yanji, Yanbian, Jilin, China. It was established in 1915.

== History ==
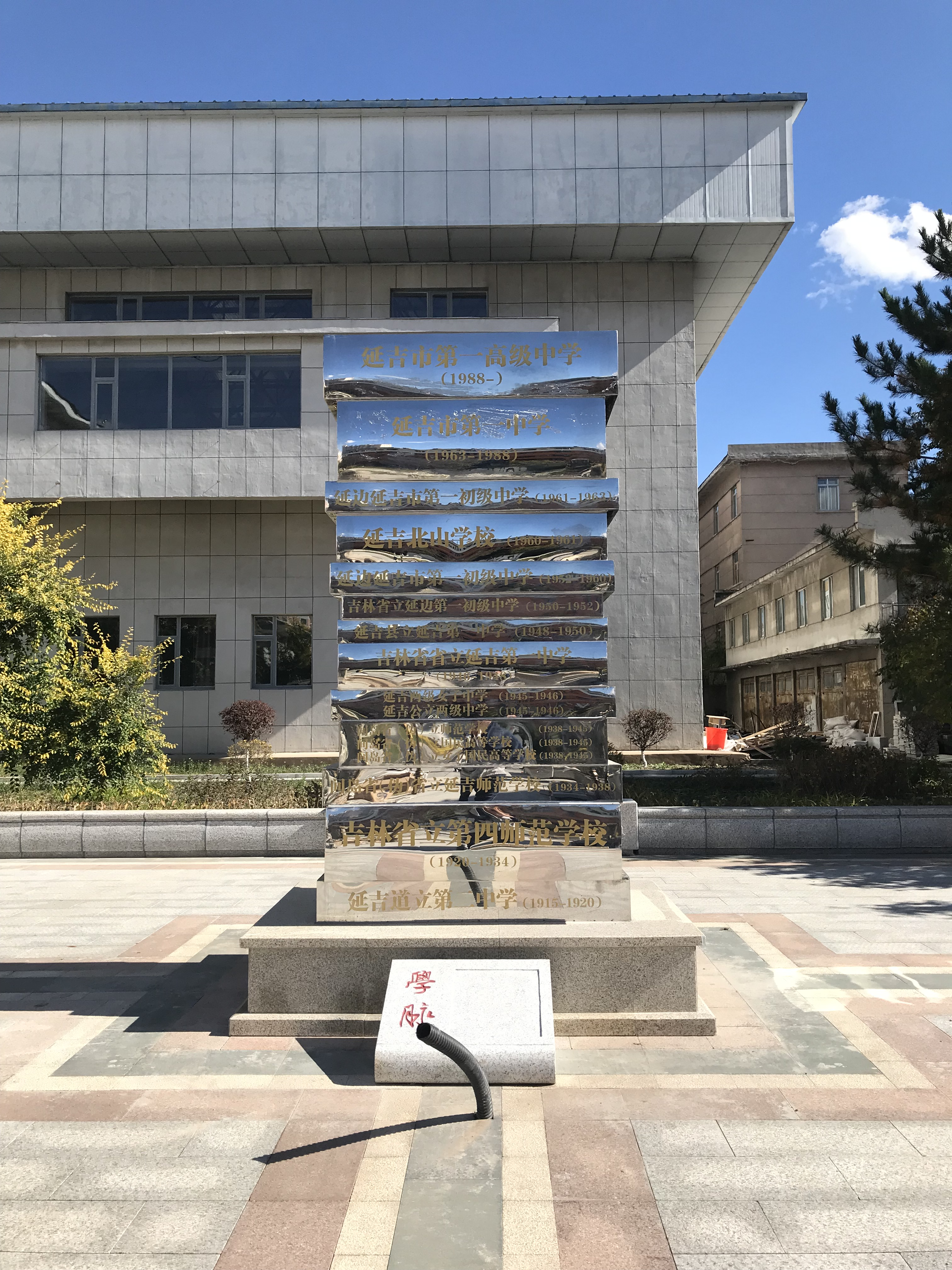
the monument of history of school (Chinese: 学脉碑)

Yanji Daoli No.2 Middle School (Chinese: 延吉道立第二中学), the predecessor of Yanji No.1 Senior High School, was founded in 1906. The school at that time was consisted of 60 Siheyuan buildings. In 1920, Yanji Daoli No.2 Middle School merged with Yanji Daoli Normal School, and established Jilin Province No.4 Normal School (Chinese: 吉林省第四师范学校).

In 1934, the school was renamed as Yanji Normal School (Chinese: 延吉师范学校), which was subsequently divided into Jiandao Provincial National College (Chinese: 间岛省立国民高等学校), Jiandao Provincial Normal School (Chinese: 间岛省立师道学校) and Jiandao Provincial Women's National College (Chinese: 间岛省立女子国民高等学校) in 1938.

After the restoration of Yanji, Wei Jinchen (Chinese: 魏近晨) presided over the transformation of Jiandao Provincial No.2 National College into Yanji Two-level Secondary School (Chinese: 延吉两级中学校), which merged with Jiandao Provincial Women's National College into Yanji No.1 Junior High School (Chinese: 延吉第一初级中学 in 1946. In 1949, in order to cultivate the urgently needed talents in regime construction and economic construction for the country, the school and Yanji No.2 Junior High School opened their respective worker-peasant cadre culture classes. In 1963, the school was renamed as Yanji No.1 Middle School (Chinese: 延吉市第一中学), and began to recruit students in the senior high school stage because of the restructuring.

In March 1978, Yanji No.1 Middle School was honored as a Provincial Key High School. In 1988, the school was renamed to the current name (Yanji No.1 Senior High School, Chinese: 延吉市第一高级中学).

== Honors ==
Yanji No.1 Senior High School was honored as a Provincial Key High School in March 1978. In 2001, Yanji No.1 Senior High School was identified as a Management Sequence School of Key Ordinary High Schools in Jilin Province by the People's Government of Jilin Province. Yanji No. 1 Senior High School was listed as one of the historical culture sites in Yanji City in September 2018.
