= Beiliu (disambiguation) =

Beiliu (北流) is a city in Guangxi, China.

Beiliu may also refer to:

- Beiliu, Shanxi (北留镇), a town in Yangcheng County, Shanxi
- Beiliu River (北流河), Guangxi
