= Dongye, Yangcheng County =

Dongye 东冶镇
- Town
- Location in Shanxi
- Coordinates: 35°21′53″N 112°29′36″E
- Country: People's Republic of China
- Province: Shanxi
- Prefecture-level city: Jincheng
- County: Yangcheng County
- Time zone: UTC+8 (China Standard)

Dongye (simplified Chinese: 东冶; traditional Chinese: 東冶; pinyin: dōngyě) is a town in Yangcheng County, Shanxi province, China. As of 2020, it administers the following 24 villages:

- Dongye Village
- Shenshuling Village (神树岭村)
- Dongxuan Village (东轩村)
- Langzhuang Village (郎庄村)
- Xiye Village (西冶村)
- Xiaowangzhuang Village (小王庄村)
- Duquan Village (独泉村)
- Shangjie Village (上节村)
- Guhe Village (古河村)
- Jiangqu Village (降区村)
- Shenzitou Village (神子头村)
- Caijie Village (蔡节村)
- Motan Village (磨滩村)
- Beidayu Village (北大峪村)
- Nandayu Village (南大峪村)
- Mashan Village (马山村)
- Xiangdi Village (相底村)
- Jianghe Village (江河村)
- Yueyuan Village (月院村)
- Gaoshi Village (高石村)
- Yaotou Village (窑头村)
- Qiuquan Village (秋泉村)
- Nansigou Village (南寺沟村)
- Gushan Village (孤山村)

== See also ==
- List of township-level divisions of Shanxi
