= Hebei, Shanxi =

Hebei 河北镇
- Town
- Location in Shanxi
- Coordinates: 35°25′1″N 112°21′24″E
- Country: People's Republic of China
- Province: Shanxi
- Prefecture-level city: Jincheng
- County: Yangcheng County
- Time zone: UTC+8 (China Standard)

Hebei (Chinese: 河北; pinyin: Héběi) is a town under the administration of Yangcheng County, Shanxi, China. As of 2020, it has twenty villages under its administration:

- Hebei Village
- Tumeng Village (土孟村)
- Xiajiao Village (下交村)
- Jiangli Village (匠礼村)
- Yuanling Village (元岭村)
- Getaowa Village (圪桃窊村)
- Nanliang Village (南梁村)
- Beiliang Village (北梁村)
- Shijialing Village (史家岭村)
- Tanyao Village (炭窑村)
- Jiujia Village (九甲村)
- Zhaogou Village (赵沟村)
- Guduidi Village (孤堆底村)
- Xitou Village (西头村)
- Dongdi Village (洞底村)
- Gelaozhang Village (圪涝掌村)
- Pingquan Village (坪泉村)
- Dongjiao Village (东交村)
- Xijiao Village (西交村)
- Yangbai Village (杨柏村)
