= Beiliu, Shanxi =

Town in Yangcheng County, Shanxi, China

Beiliu 北留镇
- Town
- Location in Shanxi
- Coordinates: 35°28′24″N 112°33′50″E
- Country: People's Republic of China
- Province: Shanxi
- Prefecture-level city: Jincheng
- County: Yangcheng County
- Time zone: UTC+8 (China Standard)

Beiliu
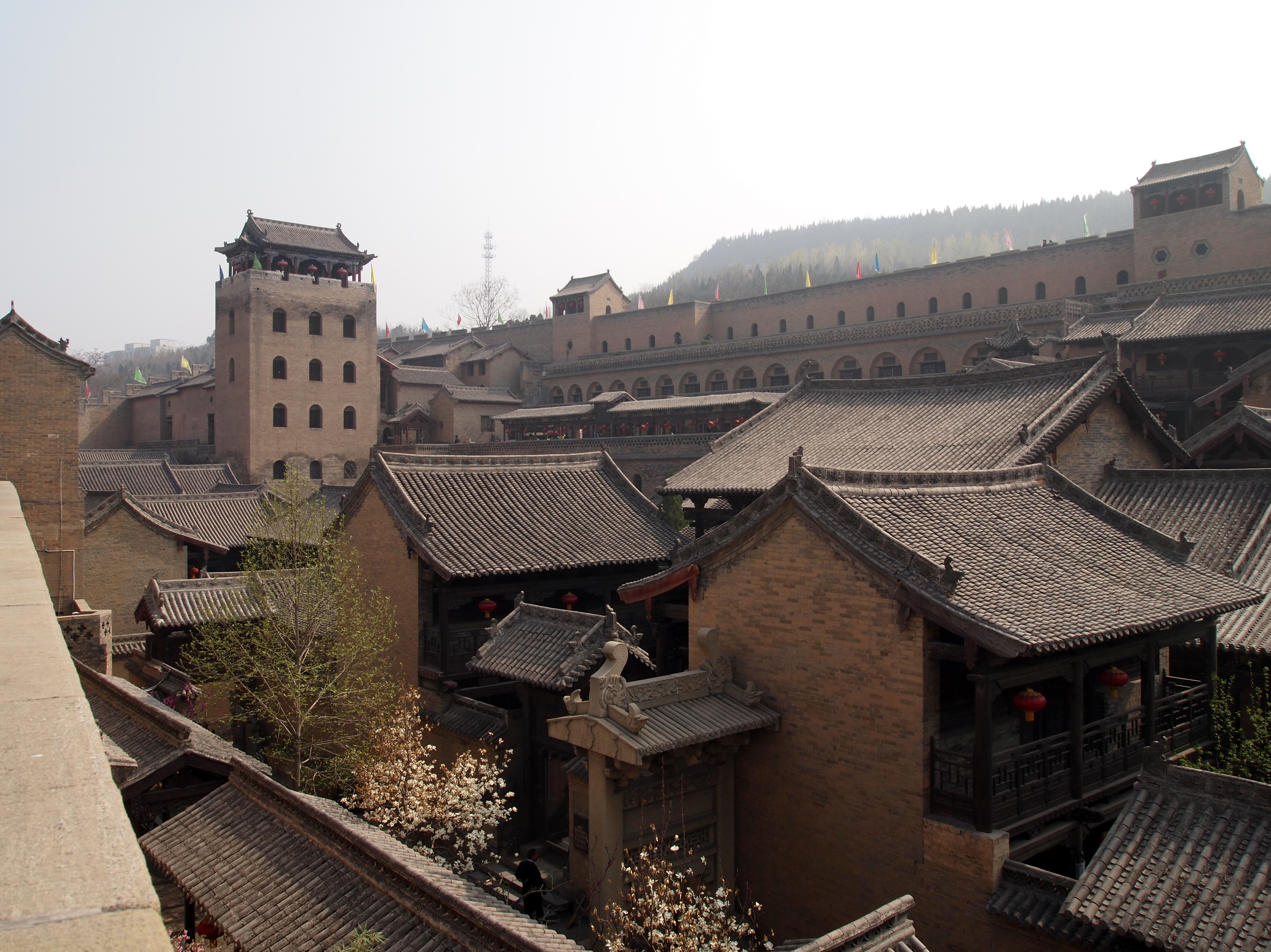
- The Tower of Rivers and Mountains overlooking the House of the Huangcheng Chancellor in Beiliu's Huangcheng Village
- Traditional Chinese: 北留鎮
- Simplified Chinese: 北留镇
Transcriptions
Standard Mandarin
- Hanyu Pinyin: Běiliúzhèn

Beiliu is a town in eastern Yangcheng County in western Jincheng Prefecture in southern Shanxi Province in central China. The town is popular among tourists because of the House of the Huangcheng Chancellor, a AAAAA-rated tourist attraction.

== Economy ==
In 1997, the coal-rich Huangcheng Village in the town changed its policy from selling coal to promoting tourism, and was successful in revitalization its rural economy.

In 2000, Huangcheng village sponsored the filming of Kangxi Dynasty, a TV drama that became a national hit. The village, which was extensively shown in the drama, thus became a popular tourist destination.

In 2023, tourism has provided revenue of over RMB 300 million for the town.

== Administrative divisions ==
Villages
Name	Simp.	Trad.	Pinyin
Beiliu	北留村	北留村	Běiliúcūn
Xingwang	杏王村	杏王村	Xìngwángcūn
Yaogou	尧沟村	堯溝村	Yáogōucūn
Jiazhuang	贾庄村	賈莊村	Jiǎzhuāngcūn
Nanliu	南留村	南留村	Nánliúcūn
Houhe	后河村	后河村	Hòuhécūn
Shiyuan	石苑村	石苑村	Shíyuàncūn
Donghe	东河村	東河村	Dōnghécūn
Nanzhuang	南庄村	南莊村	Nánzhuāngcūn
Bei	北村	北村	Běicūn
Xishentou	西神头村	西神頭村	Xīshéntóu Cūn
Zhangxun	章训村	章訓村	Zhāngxùncūn
Chongshang	崇上村	崇上村	Chóngshǎngcūn
Gao'ao	高凹村	高凹村	Gāo'āocūn
Anling	安岭村	安嶺村	Ānlǐngcūn
Nanling	南岭村	南嶺村	Nánlǐngcūn
Hengling	横岭村	橫嶺村	Hénglǐngcūn
Lijia	李家村	李家村	Lǐjiācūn
Xiaogou	小沟村	小溝村	Xiǎogōucūn
Bihe	壁河村	壁河村	Bìhécūn
Guangbi	洸壁村	洸壁村	Guāngbìcūn
Dashu	大树村	大樹村	Dàshùcūn
Tuo	坨村	坨村	Tuócūn
Dongfeng	东封村	東封村	Dōngfēngcūn
Xifeng	西封村	西封村	Xīfēngcūn
Shiyuan	柿园村	柹園村	Shìyuáncūn
Guoyu	郭峪村	郭峪村	Guōyùcūn
Daqiao	大桥村	大橋村	Dàqiáocūn
Shishan	史山村	史山村	Shǐshāncūn
Huangcheng	皇城村	皇城村	Huángchéngcūn
Wangzhuang	王庄村	王莊村	Wángzhuāngcūn
Goude	沟底村	溝底村	Gōudecūn
