= Yangcheng County =

Coordinates: 35°29′10″N 112°24′53″E

Yangcheng County 阳城县
- County
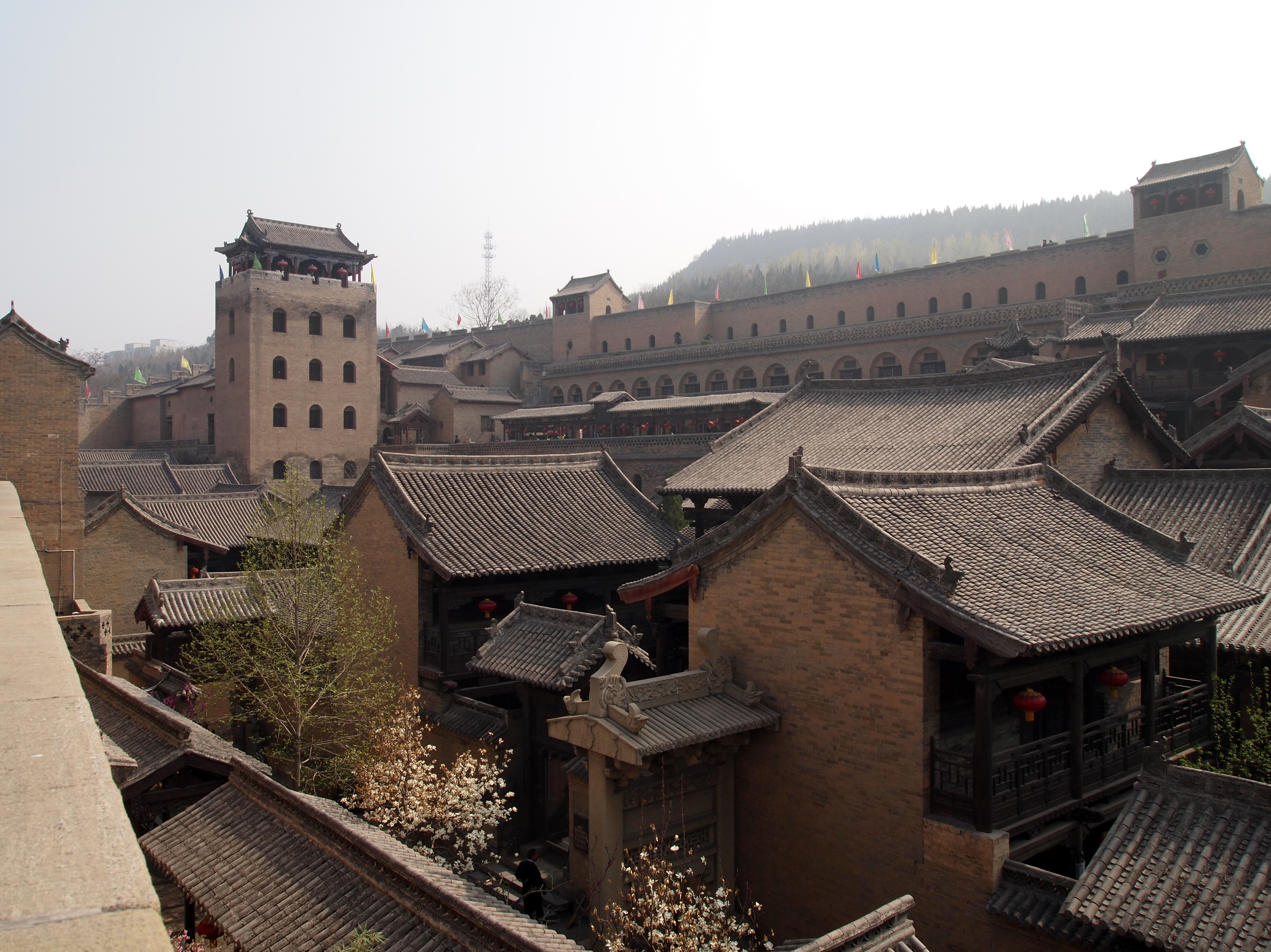
- The Tower of Rivers and Mountains in the House of the Huangcheng Chancellor in Beiliu

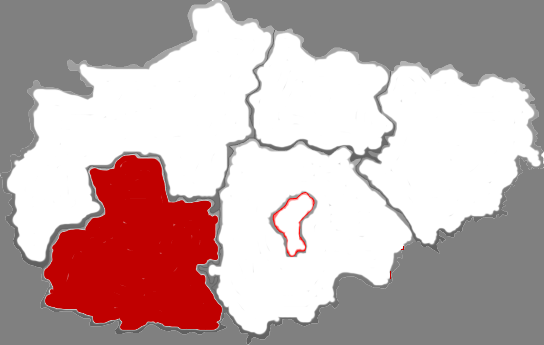
- Yangcheng in Jincheng

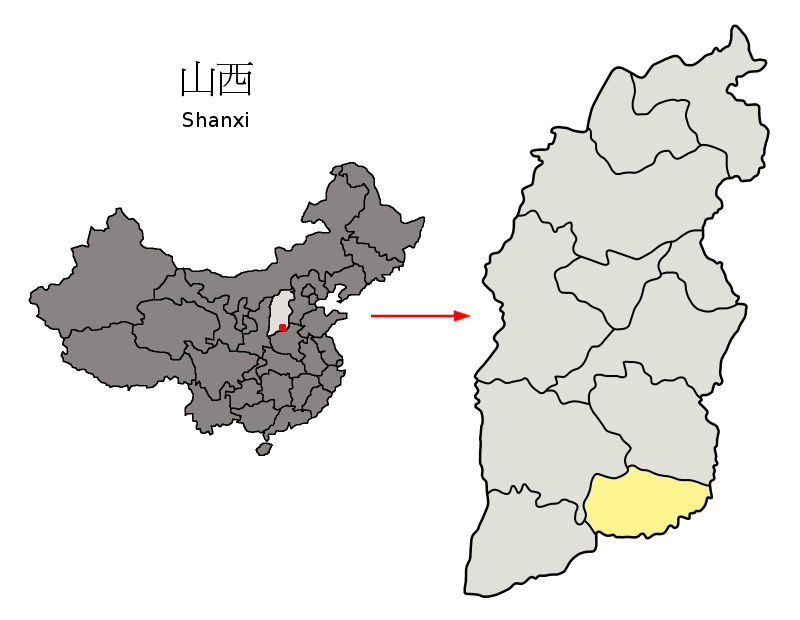
- Jincheng in Shanxi
- Country: People's Republic of China
- Province: Shanxi
- Prefecture-level city: Jincheng

Population (2020)
  - Total: 350,474
- Time zone: UTC+8 (China Standard)

Yangcheng County (simplified Chinese: 阳城县; traditional Chinese: 陽城縣; pinyin: Yángchéng Xiàn) is a county in the southeast of Shanxi Province, China, bordering Henan Province to the south. It is under the administration of the prefecture-level city of Jincheng and located in the latter's southwest confines. It is home to the AAAAA-rated House of the Huangcheng Chancellor.

== History ==
In 2002, two EPB officials in Yangcheng County were sent to jail for failing to stop a chemical plant from putting toxic waste into the drinking-water system.

== Administrative divisions ==
Towns
Name	Simp.	Trad.	Pinyin
Fengcheng	凤城镇	鳳城鎮	Fèngchéngzhèn
Beiliu	北留镇	北留鎮	Běiliúzhèn
Runcheng	润城镇	潤城鎮	Rùnchéngzhèn
Dingdian	町店镇	町店鎮	Dīngdiànzhèn
Qinchi	芹池镇	芹池鎮	Qínchízhèn
Ciying	次营镇	次營鎮	Cìyíngzhèn
Henghe	横河镇	橫河鎮	Hénghézhèn
Hebei	河北镇	河北鎮	Héběizhèn
Manghe	蟒河镇	蟒河鎮	Mǎnghézhèn
Dongye	东冶镇	東冶鎮	Dōngyězhèn
Townships
Baisang	白桑乡	白桑鄉	Báisāngxiāng
Sitou	寺头乡	寺頭鄉	Sìtóuxiāng
Xihe	西河乡	西河鄉	Xīhéxiāng
Yanli	演礼乡	演禮鄉	Yǎnlǐxiāng
Gulong	固隆乡	固隆鄉	Gùlóngxiāng
Dongfeng	董封乡	董封鄉	Dǒngfēngxiāng
Jialing	驾岭乡	駕嶺鄉	Jiàlǐngxiāng
Subdistricts
Dongcheng	东城街道	東城街道	Dōngchéng Jiēdào
Forest Areas
Yangcheng County Forest	阳城县林场	陽城縣林場	Yángchéngxiàn Línchǎng

== Climate ==
Climate data for Yangcheng, elevation 660 m (2,170 ft), (1991–2020 normals, extremes 1991–present)
Month	Jan	Feb	Mar	Apr	May	Jun	Jul	Aug	Sep	Oct	Nov	Dec	Year
Record high °C (°F)	16.8 (62.2)	21.3 (70.3)	30.2 (86.4)	37.2 (99.0)	37.7 (99.9)	39.5 (103.1)	39.7 (103.5)	37.6 (99.7)	38.4 (101.1)	30.3 (86.5)	23.7 (74.7)	16.0 (60.8)	39.7 (103.5)
Mean daily maximum °C (°F)	4.0 (39.2)	7.9 (46.2)	14.1 (57.4)	21.1 (70.0)	26.0 (78.8)	29.8 (85.6)	30.5 (86.9)	28.9 (84.0)	24.5 (76.1)	18.9 (66.0)	11.9 (53.4)	5.6 (42.1)	18.6 (65.5)
Daily mean °C (°F)	−2.0 (28.4)	1.5 (34.7)	7.3 (45.1)	14.0 (57.2)	19.3 (66.7)	23.4 (74.1)	24.9 (76.8)	23.5 (74.3)	18.7 (65.7)	12.7 (54.9)	5.7 (42.3)	−0.3 (31.5)	12.4 (54.3)
Mean daily minimum °C (°F)	−6.6 (20.1)	−3.2 (26.2)	2.0 (35.6)	8.1 (46.6)	13.2 (55.8)	17.6 (63.7)	20.6 (69.1)	19.5 (67.1)	14.3 (57.7)	7.9 (46.2)	1.1 (34.0)	−4.6 (23.7)	7.5 (45.5)
Record low °C (°F)	−16.7 (1.9)	−13.6 (7.5)	−7.4 (18.7)	−3.0 (26.6)	3.3 (37.9)	10.6 (51.1)	13.7 (56.7)	12.0 (53.6)	3.6 (38.5)	−1.7 (28.9)	−13.2 (8.2)	−16.0 (3.2)	−16.7 (1.9)
Average precipitation mm (inches)	8.3 (0.33)	12.4 (0.49)	16.2 (0.64)	38.5 (1.52)	49.8 (1.96)	62.8 (2.47)	139.8 (5.50)	102.2 (4.02)	77.1 (3.04)	39.3 (1.55)	20.4 (0.80)	5.1 (0.20)	571.9 (22.52)
Average precipitation days (≥ 0.1 mm)	4.1	4.4	5.1	6.1	7.3	8.9	11.6	11.5	9.4	6.7	4.9	2.8	82.8
Average snowy days	4.8	4.6	2.3	0.4	0	0	0	0	0	0.1	1.6	3.7	17.5
Average relative humidity (%)	53	53	50	52	54	59	72	75	72	66	60	52	60
Mean monthly sunshine hours	174.3	174.6	207.4	233.4	255.4	238.1	216.1	200.9	176.2	181.4	175.6	180.4	2,413.8
Percentage possible sunshine	56	56	56	59	59	55	49	49	48	53	57	60	55
Source: China Meteorological Administration

== Popular culture ==
The movie Inn of the Sixth Happiness is based on the story of Gladys Aylward's missionary activities in the county.
