= Sitou Township =

Sitou Township 寺头乡
- Township
- Location in Shanxi
- Coordinates: 35°37′20″N 112°23′23″E
- Country: People's Republic of China
- Province: Shanxi
- Prefecture-level city: Jincheng
- County: Yangcheng County
- Time zone: UTC+8 (China Standard)

Sitou Township (Chinese: 寺头乡; pinyin: Sìtóu Xiāng) is a township of Yangcheng County, Shanxi province, China. As of 2020, it has 14 villages under its administration:

- Sitou Village
- Nanshu Village (南树村)
- Beixiazhuang Village (北下庄村)
- Zhangjiazhuang Village (张家庄村)
- Anshang Village (安上村)
- Dongjialing Village (董家岭村)
- Qianshishan Village (前史山村)
- Laomeng Village (老孟村)
- Zhu Village (朱村)
- Shudi Village (黍地村)
- Jizhuang Village (吉庄村)
- Mazhai Village (马寨村)
- Sanhe Village (三合村)
- Xinfeng Village (鑫丰村)

== See also ==
- List of township-level divisions of Shanxi
