= House of the Huangcheng Chancellor =

Walled estate comprising Huangcheng in Shanxi, China

Coordinates: 35°30′52″N 112°34′39.5″E

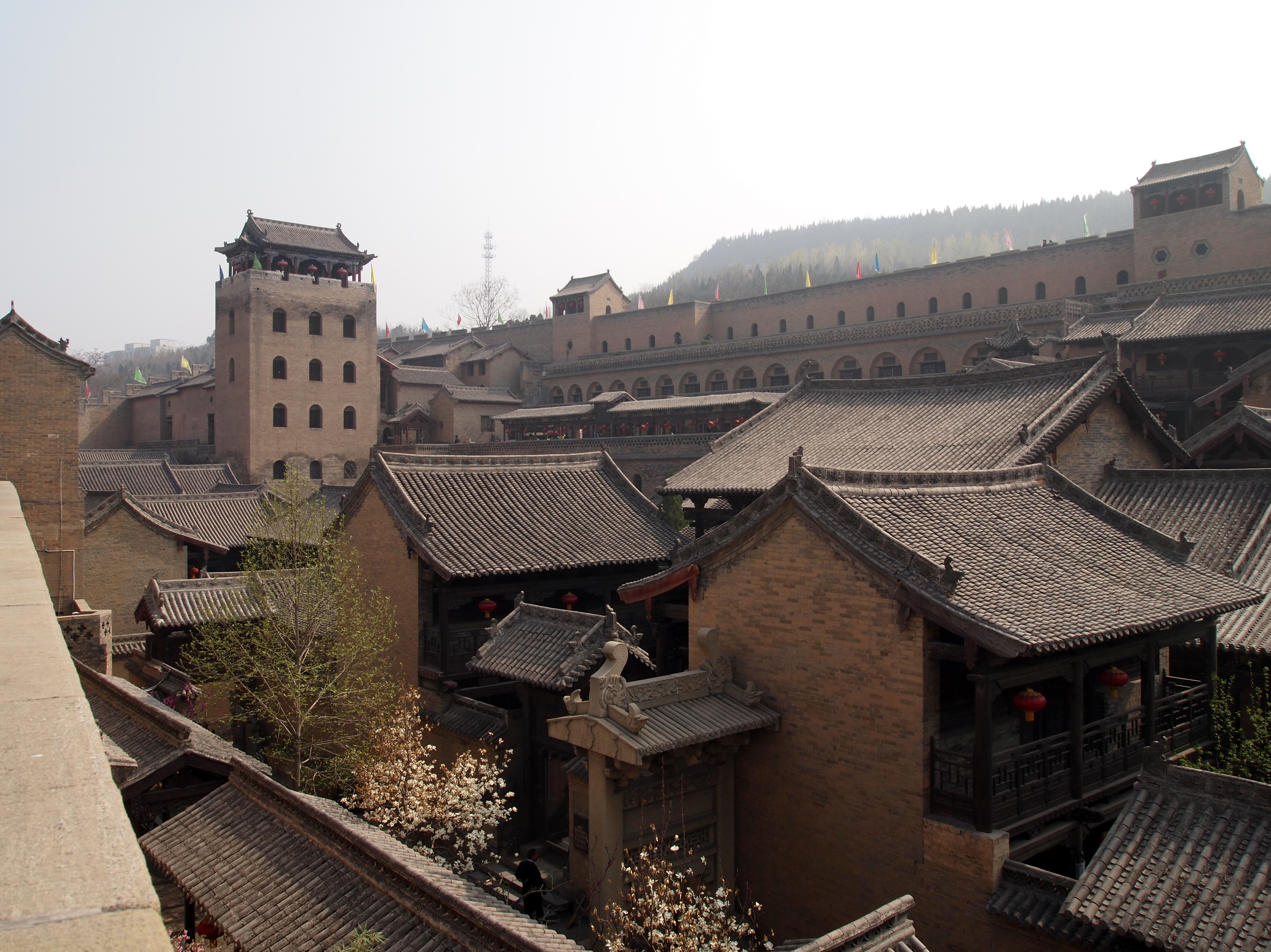
- The Tower of Rivers and Mountains, overlooking the interior of the House of the Huangcheng Chancellor
- Chinese: 皇城相府
- Literal meaning: Imperial City-style Residence of the Chancellor
Transcriptions
Standard Mandarin
- Hanyu Pinyin: Huángchéng Xiāngfǔ
- Wade–Giles: Huang-ch'êng Hsiang Fu

Huangcheng Village
- Chinese: 皇城村
- Literal meaning: Imperial City Village
Transcriptions
Standard Mandarin
- Hanyu Pinyin: Huángchéngcūn
- Wade–Giles: Huang-ch'êng Ts'un

Turtle City
- Traditional Chinese: 龜城
- Simplified Chinese: 龟城
Transcriptions
Standard Mandarin
- Hanyu Pinyin: Guīchéng
- Wade–Giles: Kuei Ch'êng

The House of the Huangcheng Chancellor, also known by its Chinese name, Huangcheng Xiangfu, (Note: Also known as the "Premier's Mansion", "Royal Residence of the Premier", the "Royal Prime Minister's Palace", and the "House of the Chancellor at Huangcheng".) is a 10-hectare (25-acre) walled estate on Phoenix Hill (Fenghuangshan) comprising Huangcheng, a village occupying a hollow above the Changhe Valley between Yangcheng and Jincheng in southeastern Shanxi, China. It is composed of numerous siheyuan-style courtyards built into the side of a hill, overlooked by defensive towers and enclosed by high crenellated walls that divide it into two sections. The fortifications were built in the seventeenth and eighteenth centuries, during the late Ming and early Qing dynasties.

It has been called the "greatest cultural residence in North China". China's National Tourism Administration gave it a AAAAA rating in 2011.

== History ==
The Chen family in Shanxi began erecting buildings on Phoenix Hill overlooking the Fanxi River around the 1440s under China's Ming dynasty. The family began as farmers, built a fortune through coal mining, and then began emphasizing the education of their children. During the Ming and Qing dynasties, the family produced 66 mandarins, 33 poets, and 9 first-place winners of Shanxi's provincial examinations.

The property was encastellated for Chen Changyan in 1633. The fortifications served to protect the household and its attendant villagers from unrest during the reign of the Chongzhen Emperor. This "inner city" (内城, Nèichéng) runs along a north–south axis along the side of the hill, facing downhill toward the west.

The compound was expanded in 1703 for Chen Tingjing, tutor to the Kangxi Emperor of the Qing and the chief editor of the Kangxi Dictionary. His "outer city" (外城, Wàichéng) lies on flat ground against the entrance to the upper section of the estate, facing south toward the warehouses and shops lining the Street of Ancient Culture. Supposedly, the grand nature of the finished complex drew charges of disloyalty and imperial pretensions from Chen's political opponents, but he claimed to have established it to please his mother, who wished to see Beijing, but was too frail to complete the journey. In any case, the Kangxi Emperor visited the location twice, praising it and its owner, who never fell from his favor.

The site was damaged during the Cultural Revolution in the 1960s and 1970s. It received a 30m RMB restoration starting in 1998, and the China National Tourism Administration named the House of the Huangcheng Chancellor a AAAAA tourist attraction in 2011. By 2012, it was attracting millions of visitors each year.

== Architecture ==
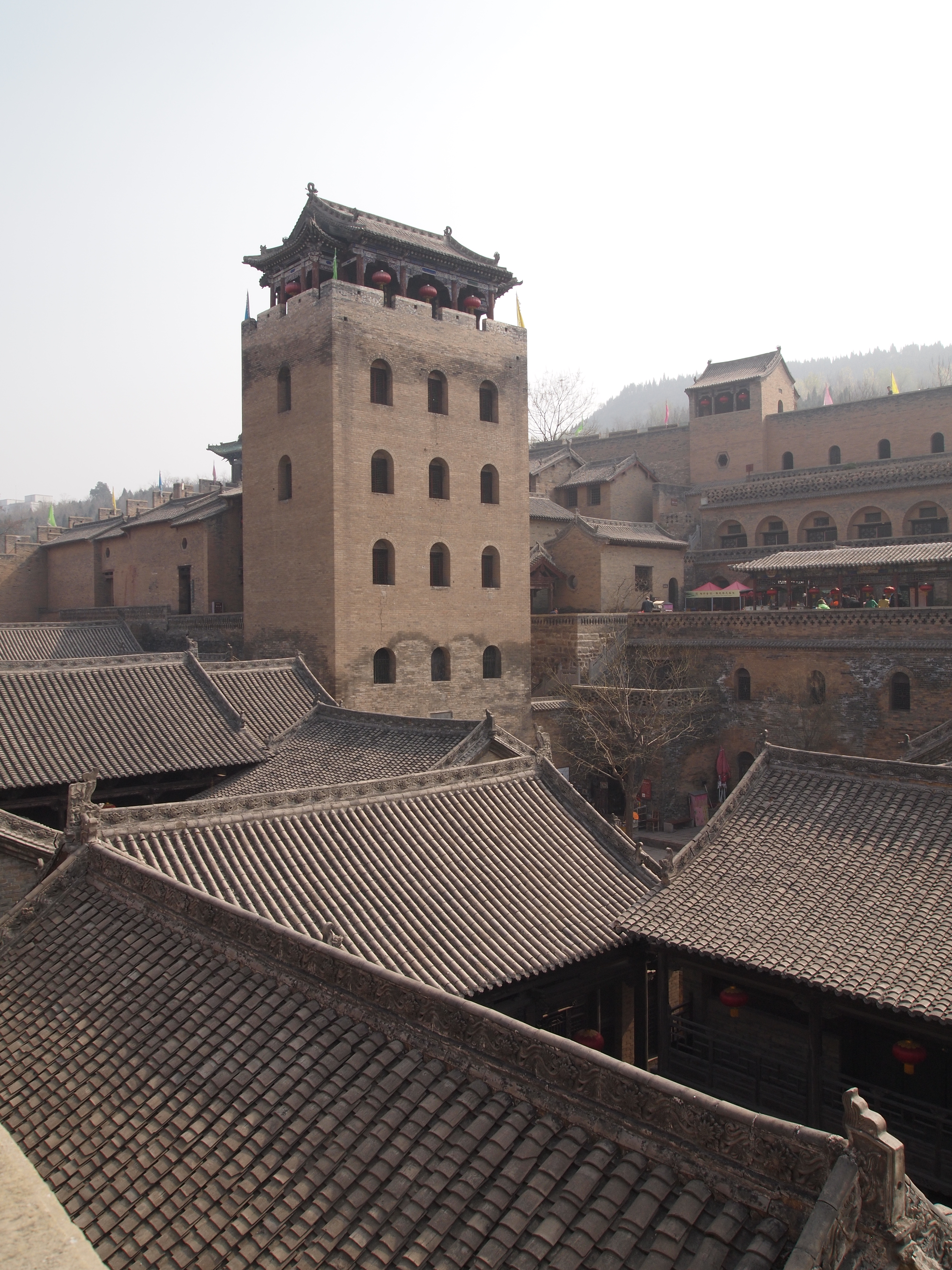
The Tower of Rivers and Mountains

The walls have nine gates and enclose 19 gardens and 640 rooms. In its present form, almost all of the structures are organized in the siheyuan style, with most buildings opening onto enclosed and interconnected courtyards.

The Shideyuan (Note: Also known as the "Shide Courtyard".) (世德院, Shìdéyuàn; 1505 x 1521) encloses three lofty rooms on the hilltop, now at the southeast corner of the "inner city". It was the site of Chen Tingjing's birth in 1638. The yard to its rear is flanked to the north by the Zhongyi and to the south by the Yongkun. Both are composed of a three-story main building with two-story wing buildings extending forward at each side.

Rongshan's House (容山公府, Róngshān Gōngfǔ; c. 1544) was the home of Chen Tianyou (styled "Rongshan"), the first member of the family to pass the imperial examinations and become a mandarin. He began to serve under the Jiajing Emperor, eventually reaching the rank of vice-inspector for Shaanxi.

The Clan Temple (Note: Also known as the "Chen Ancestral Hall" and the "Patriarch Temple".) (t 陳氏宗祠, s 陈氏宗祠, Chénshì Zōngcí; 1521 x 1567) is the Chen's ancestral shrine, placed on the central axis of the estate, with a worshipping hall in the front and a hall of celebrated ancestors in the back.

The Tower of Rivers and Mountains (Note: Also known as the "Heshan Tower".) (t 河山樓, s 河山楼, Héshānlóu; 1632) was a defensive structure used to protect the family and its attendants during periods of unrest and war. Counting the basement, it has seven stories, totaling ten zhang (about 30 m or 100 ft). The entrance is located on the second floor and is accessed only by a bridge to another level of the complex. The base is 3 zhangs, 4 chi wide (kaijian) by 2 zhangs, 4 chi long (jinshen). Its basement accesses multiple secret tunnels; it also includes a well and room for food stores to wait out longer sieges. It was completed in a span of seven months and supposedly proved its worth shortly after construction, when locals easily weathered a raid that devastated the neighboring village of Guoyu.

The Villa of the Golden Mean (Note: Also known as the "Zhongdao Villa".) (t 中道莊, s 中道庄, Zhōngdàozhuāng; 1642) (Note: The English article on the villa gives the mistaken date "1429".) was Chen Tingjing's primary residence.

The House of the Academician (t 大學士第, s 大学士第, Dàxuéshì Dì) or Chancellor (Note: Also known as the "House of the Grand Scholar", "Grand Secretary", or "Minister of Personnel".) (相府院, Xiāngfǔyuàn; 1644–1703) is a complete household with gardens, a hall, a study, bedrooms, and servant quarters. It was visited by the Kangxi Emperor twice, and he wrote a plaque in its honor.

The Studying Rooms (Note: Also known as the "South Academy".) (t 南書院, s 南书院, Nánshūyuàn; 1651) are a courtyard and adjacent classrooms used for centuries by tutors to educate the younger members of the family.

The Zhiyuan Garden (t 止園, s 止园, Zhǐyuán; 1661) is the biggest garden in the estate, covering 1.1 hectares (2.7 acres). (Note: The English article mistakenly identifies the Zhiyuan Garden as the West Garden.)

The Stone Portal (石牌坊, Shípáifāng; 1699) is a paifang that was erected while Chen Tingjing was the imperial Minister of Personnel. It is decorated with panels detailing the accomplishments of the Chens over the preceding five generations. A plaque by the Kangxi Emperor reads "Nine winners of the state examination within one family full of virtues and good deeds, and six academicians throughout three generations bearing the favor and trust of the Emperor".

The Tower of Imperial Handwriting (t 禦書樓, s 御书楼, Yùshūlóu; 1714) was built to store plaques and other written documents given to the family by the Kangxi Emperor.

Other areas of the estate include the Douzhuju Residence (斗筑居, Dòuzhùjū); the Wenchang Tower (t 文昌閣, s 文昌阁, Wénchānggé) with its Confucian shrine; the Chunqiu Tower of General Guan (Note: Also known as the "Spring and Autumn Pavilion".) (t 春秋閣, s 春秋阁, Chūnqiūgé) with its shrine to the war god Guan Yu; the Xishanyuan Courtyard (西山院, Xīshānyuàn) with its area for Taoist rituals; the "Cave of Fighters" garrison (藏兵洞, Zàngbīngdòng), whose rooms are built into the side of the hill; the Qilin Yard (麒麟院, Qílínyuàn) first built for Chen Tingjing's grandfather Chen Jingji, with its stone decorations of the "Chinese unicorn" or qilin; (Note: The English article mistakenly identifies the Qilin Yard as the Wanghe Pavilion.) the Wanghe Pavilion (望河亭, Wànghétíng) and Yard of Young Ladies (Note: Also known as the "Ladies' Yard".) (小姐院, Xiǎojieyuàn) in the women's quarters on the lowest level; the Ziyunqian Graveyard (紫芸阡, Zǐyúnqiān) with memorials to Chen Tingjing by his family and the Kangxi Emperor; the southern-style West Garden (Note: Also known as the "Mu Garden".) (t 西花園, s 西花园, Xīhuāyuán), consisting of Clam Pool and surrounding rockeries imitating Shandong's Mount Tai; the Housekeepers' Yard (管家院, Guǎnjiāyuàn) with the small, lower-ranking servants' quarters; and a Street of Ancient Culture (古文化街, Gǔwénhuā Jiē) in the estate's old trading and warehousing area.

== Performances ==
The estate holds a ceremony imitating those held to welcome the Kangxi Emperor.

== Museums ==
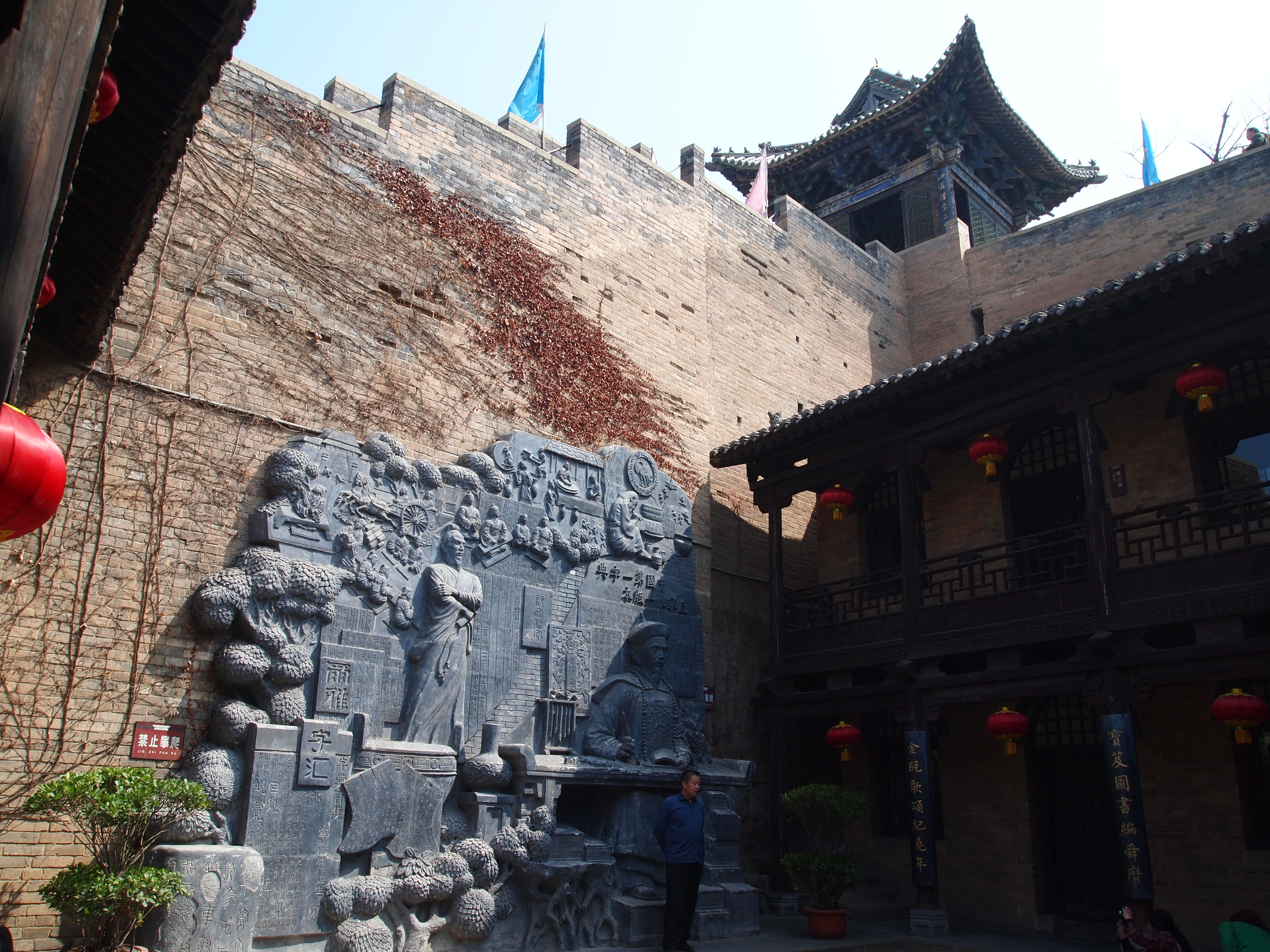
The Chinese Dictionary Museum

The Inspector's House (御史府, Yùshǐfǔ) was originally the home of Chen Changyan, an uncle of Chen Tingjing, who served as the imperial inspector for Zhejiang. It is now used as a museum to describe Yangcheng County's history of iron casting.

The complex now also houses the Chinese Dictionary Museum (t 中華字典博物館, s 中华字典博物馆, Zhōnghuá Zìdiǎn Bówùguǎn). The museum, established in May 2016 with a private donation of 4,000 works, now holds more than 15,000 volumes. It describes the history of Chinese encyclopedias and dictionaries, with a special focus on the Kangxi Zidian, compiled under Chen Tingjing. The museum has 128 editions of the dictionary, the earliest copy having been donated by Hua Shaofeng in 2014 and dating to the Kangxi Era. It is so fragile that special tools are used to turn its pages.

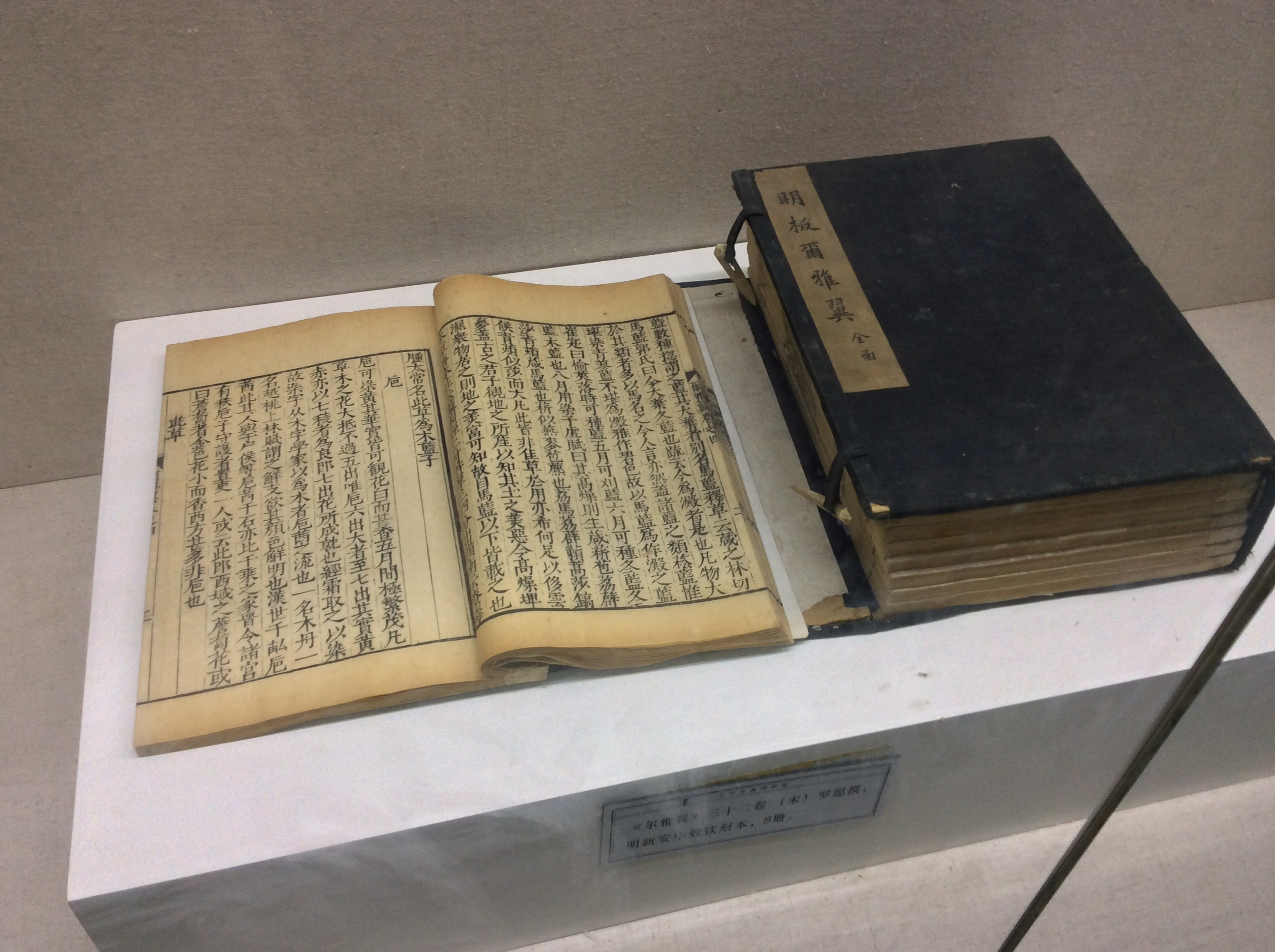
Luo Yuan's Erya Yi

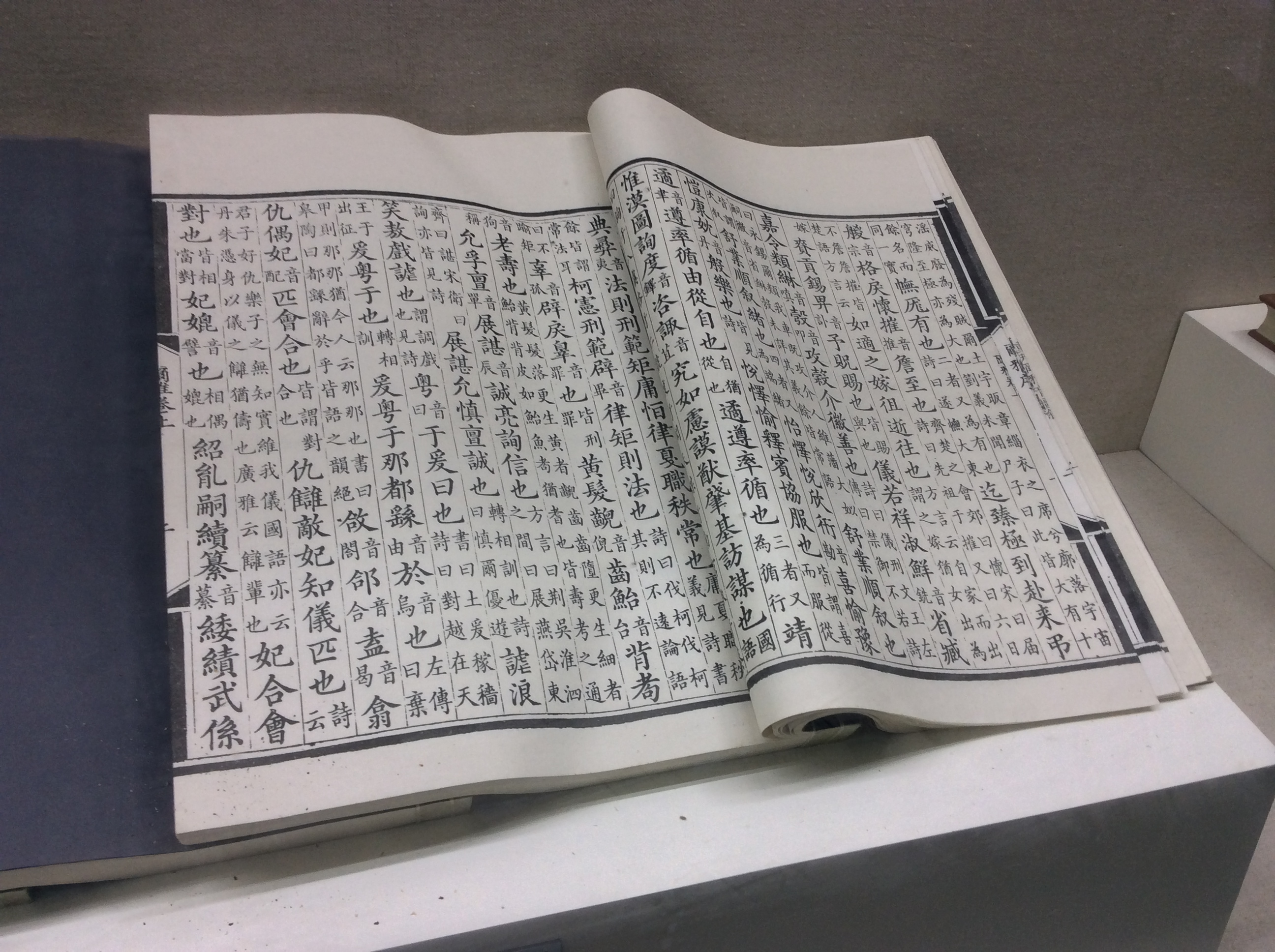
The Erya Yintu

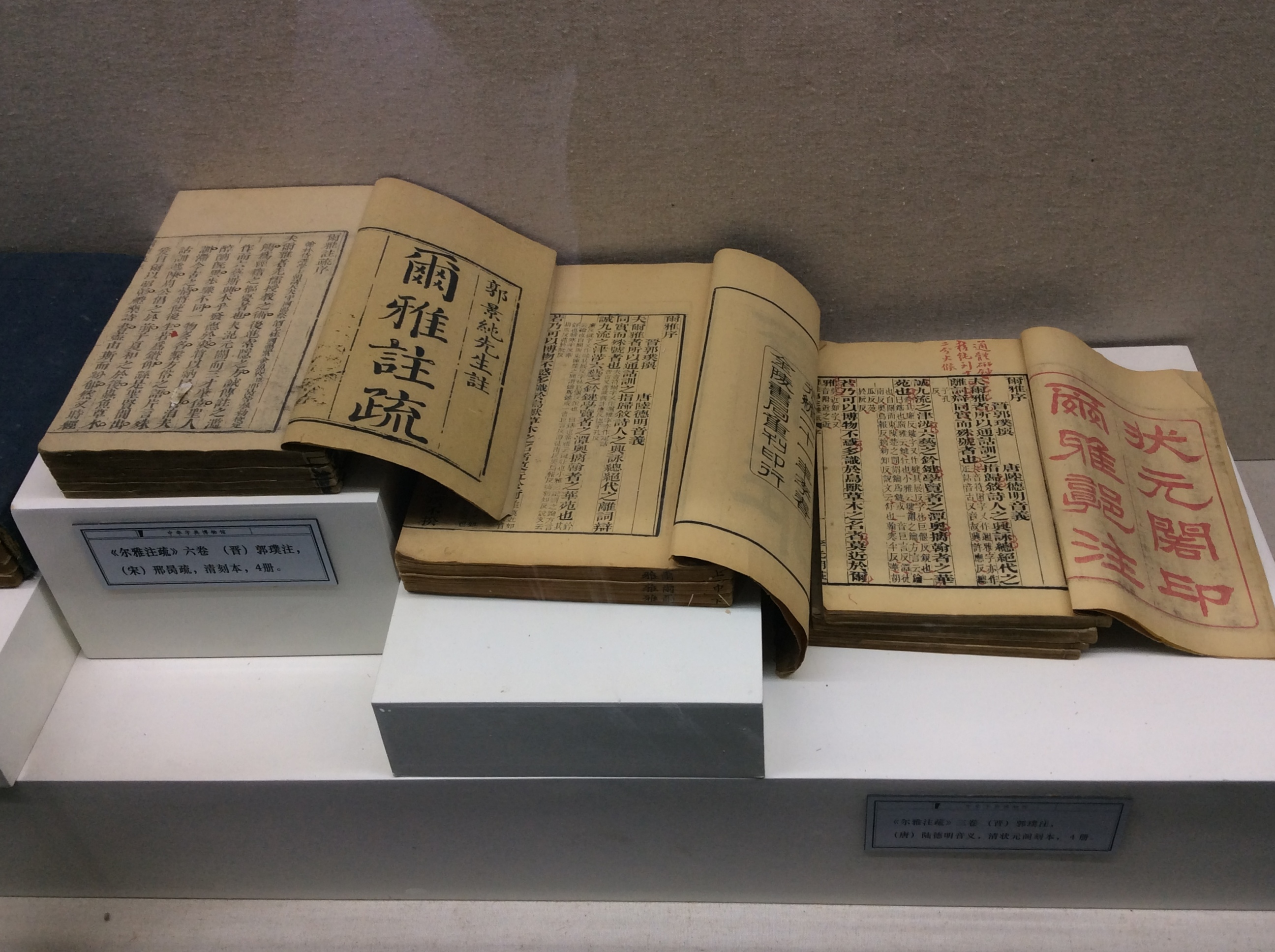
The Erya Zhushu

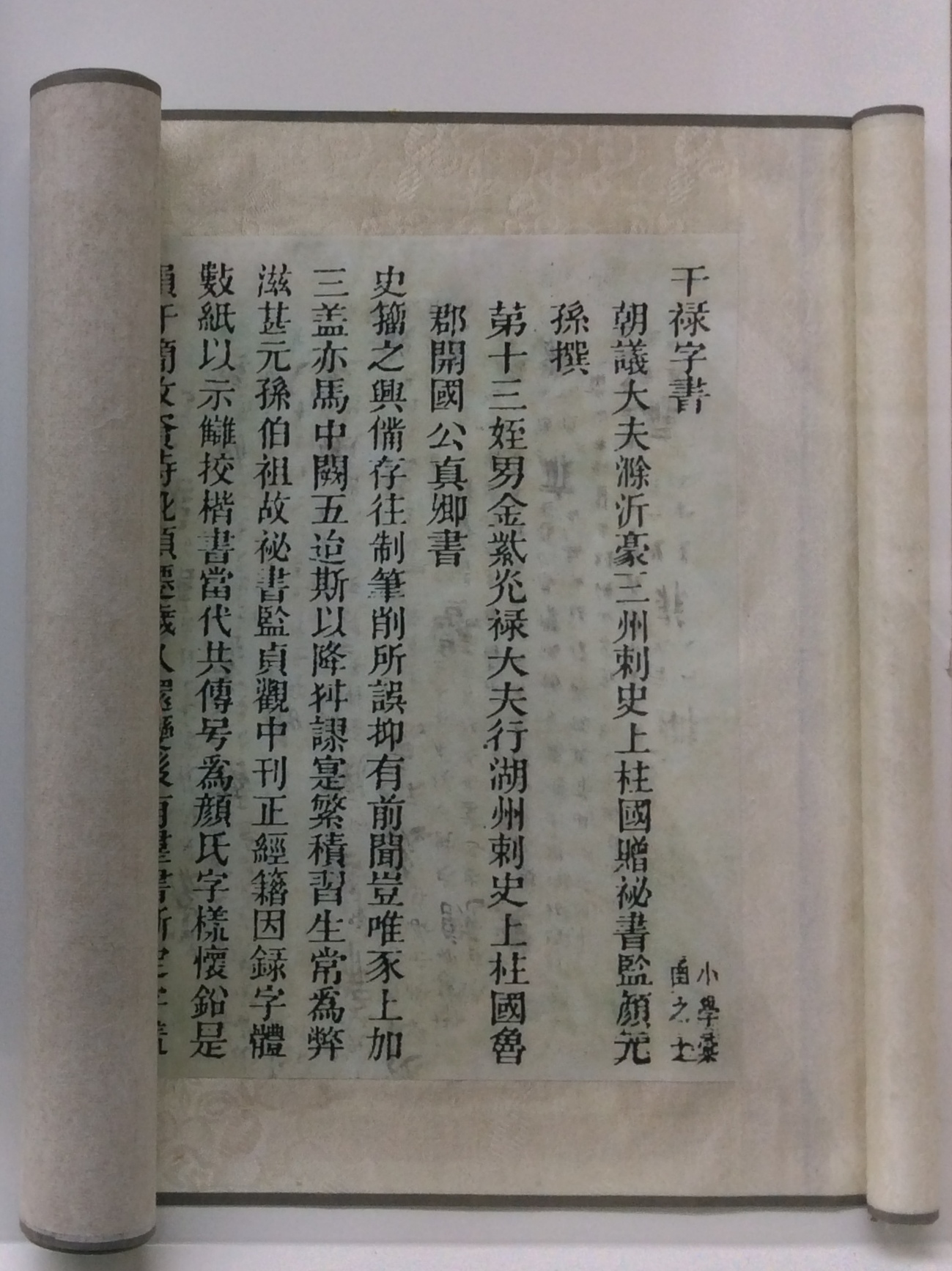
Yan Yuansun's Ganlu Zishu, a guide to calligraphy for test-takers

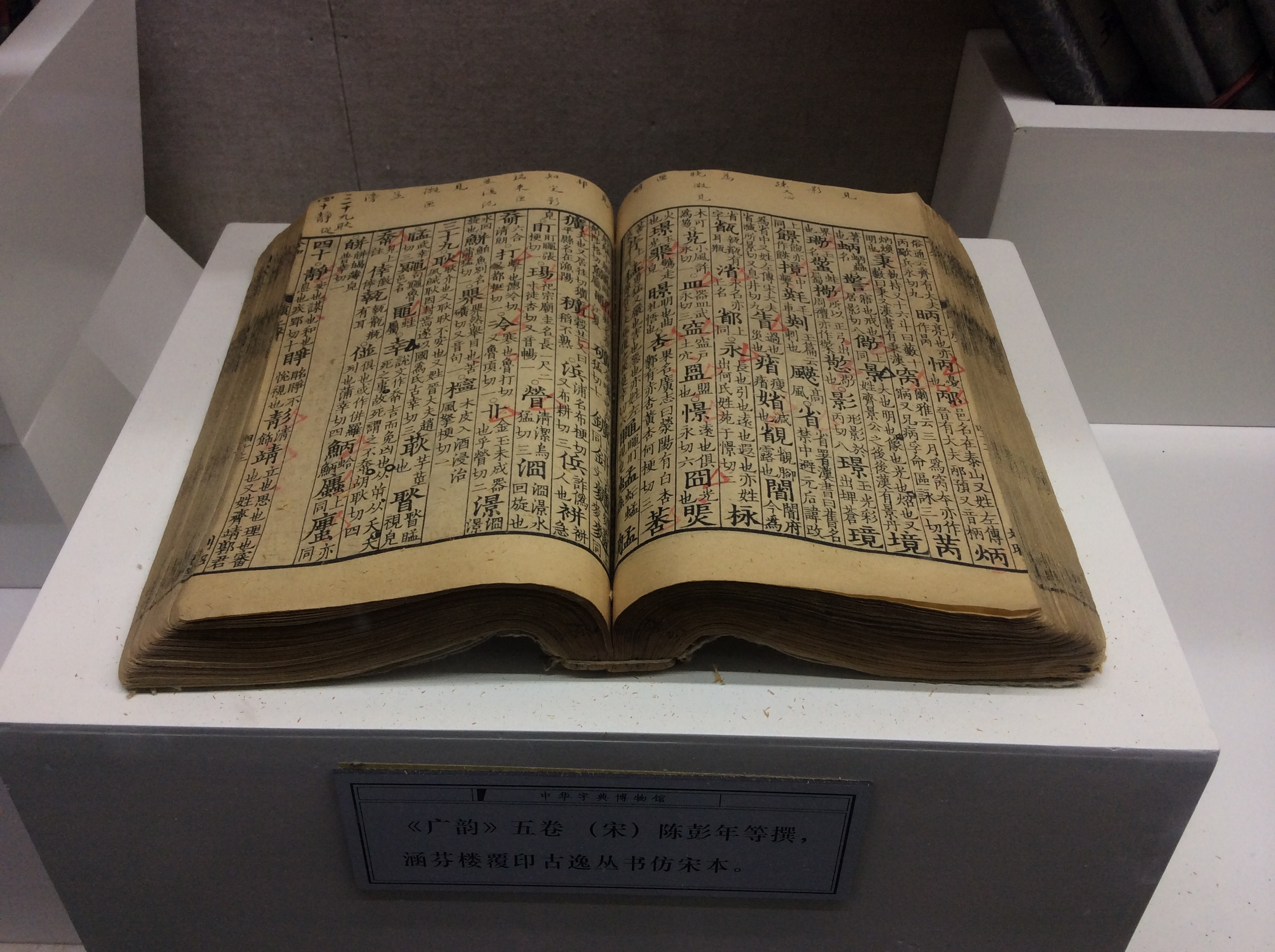
The Guangyun rhyming dictionary

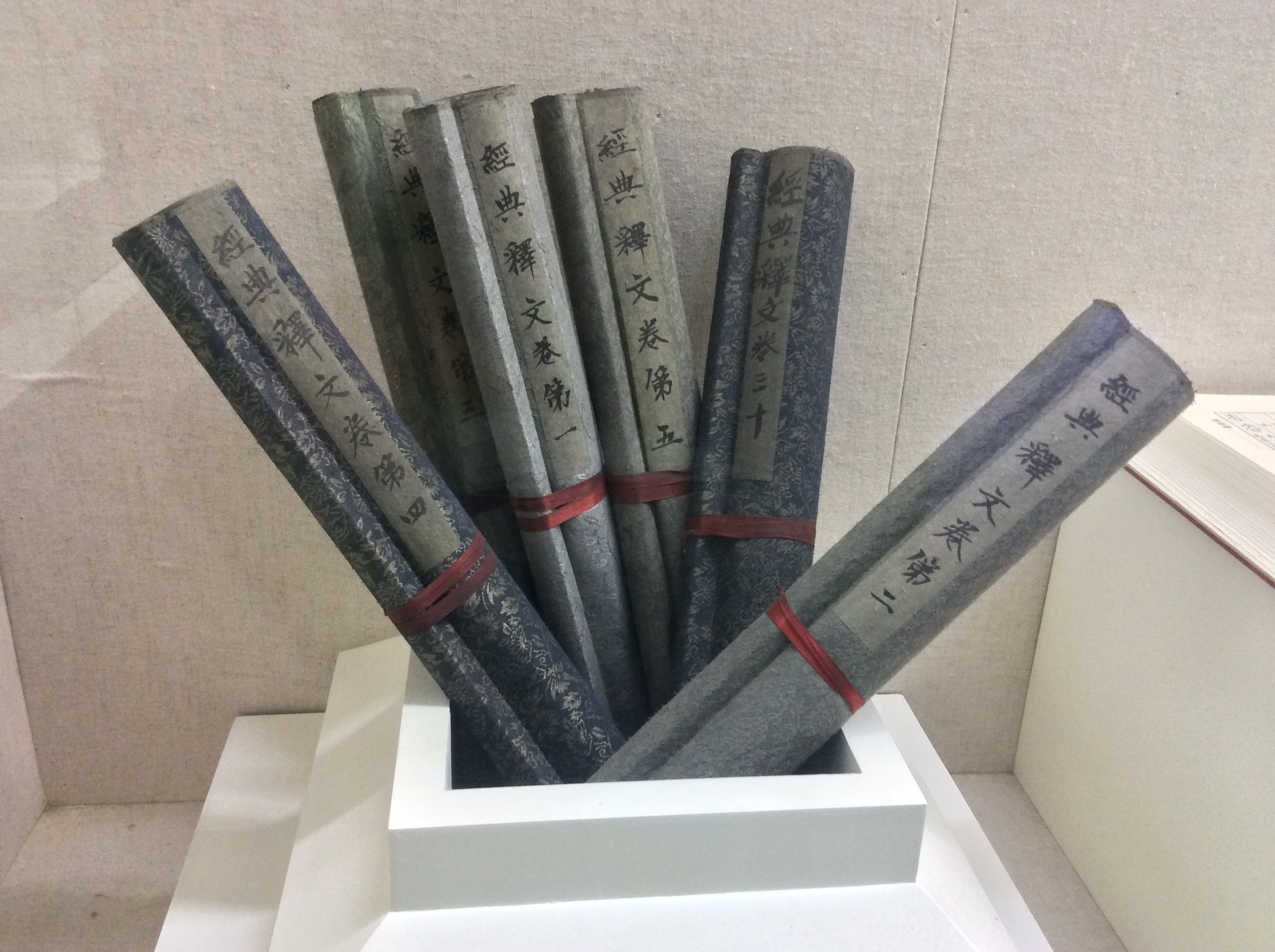
Lu Deming's Jingdian Shiwen

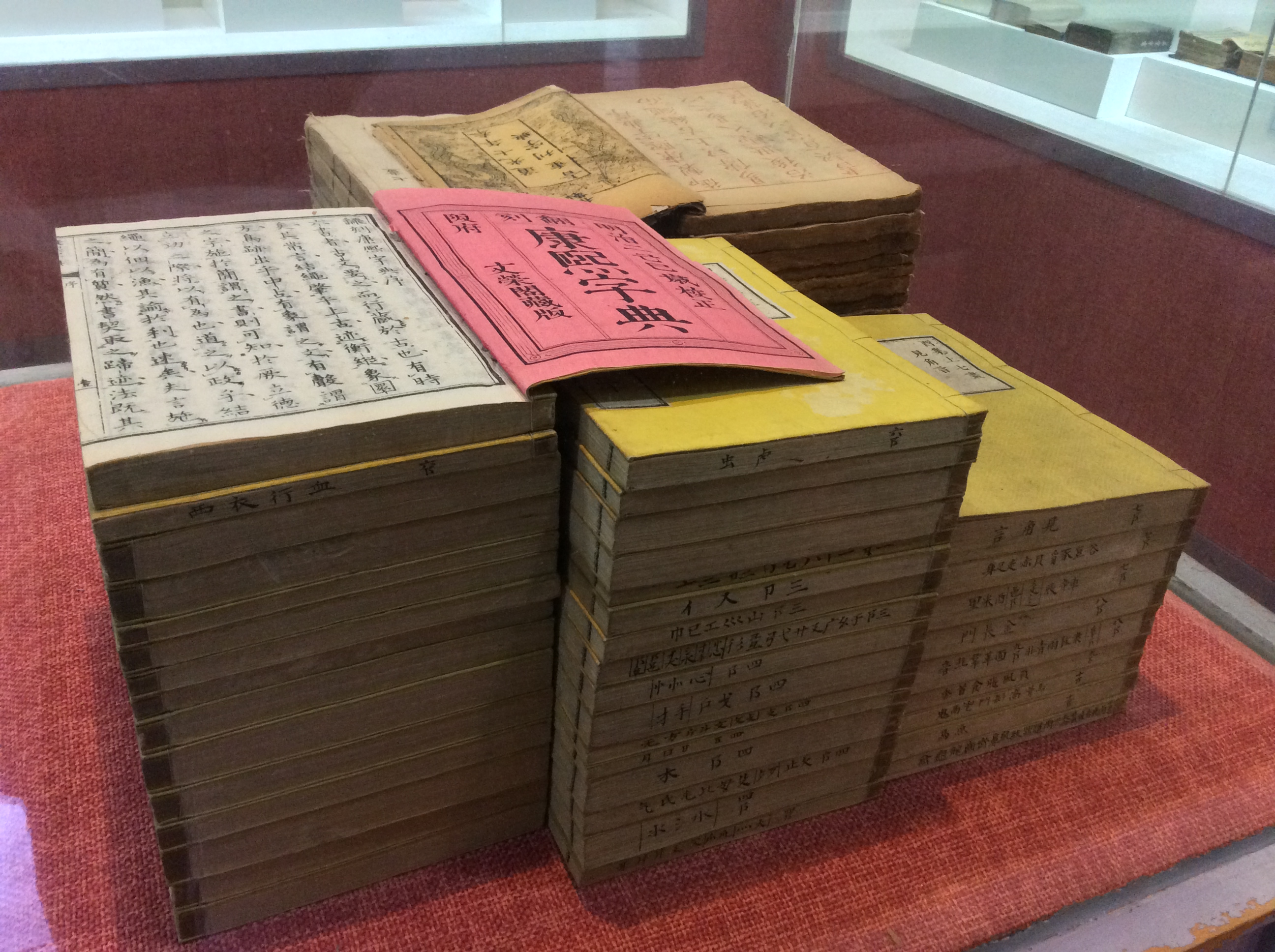
An annotated Japanese edition of the Kangxi Dictionary

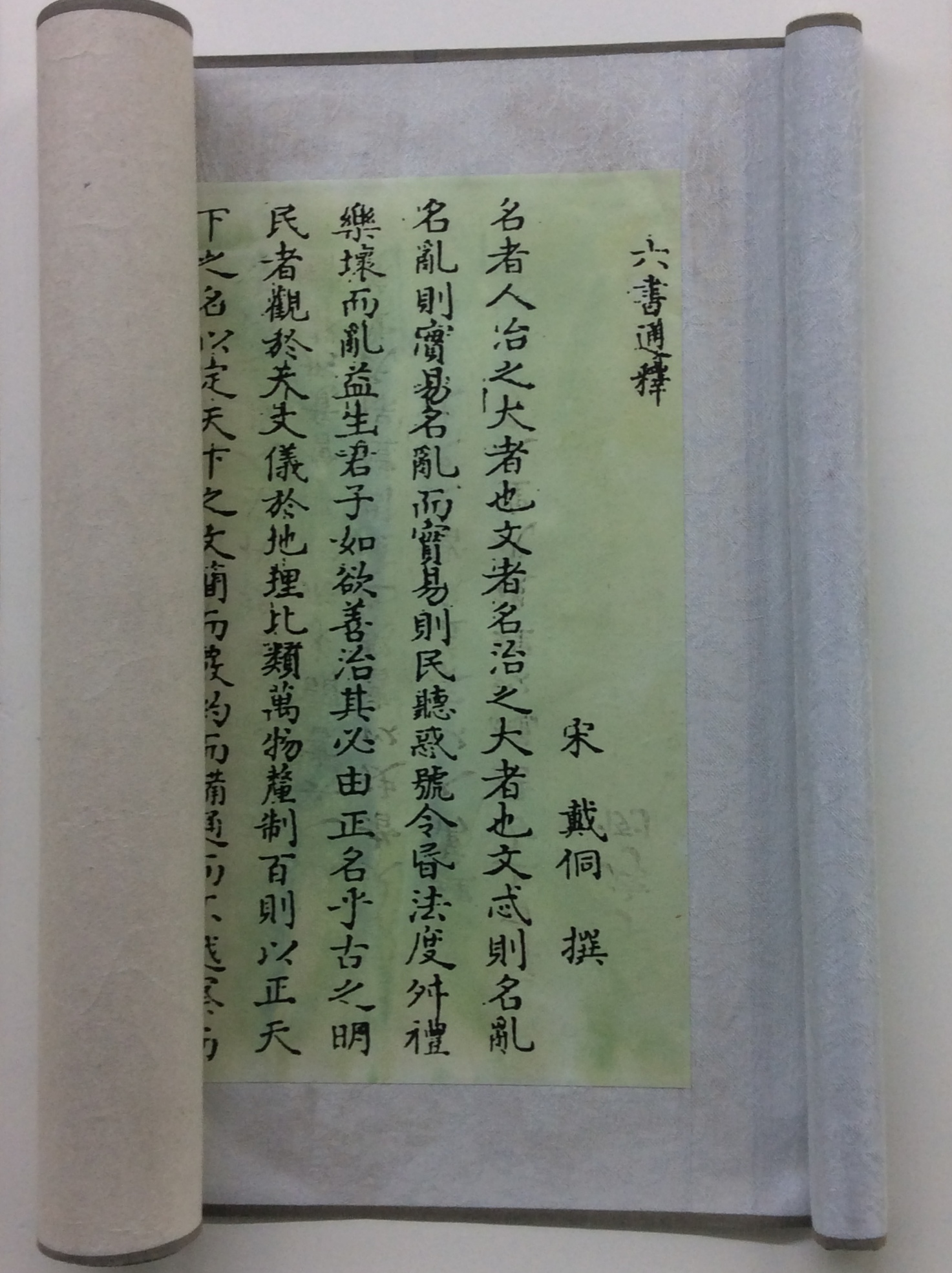
The Liushu Tongshi

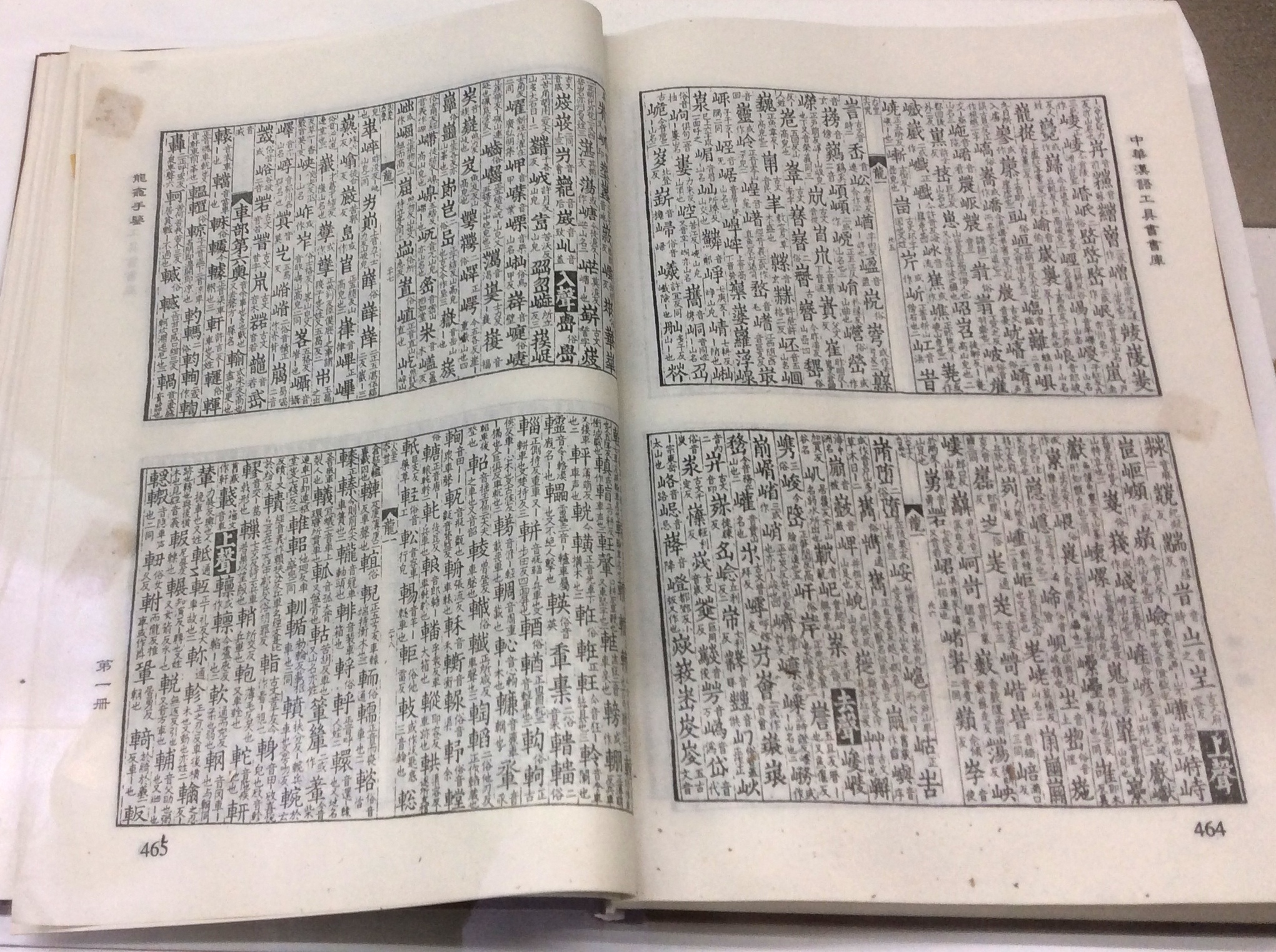
Xingjun's Longkan Shoujian

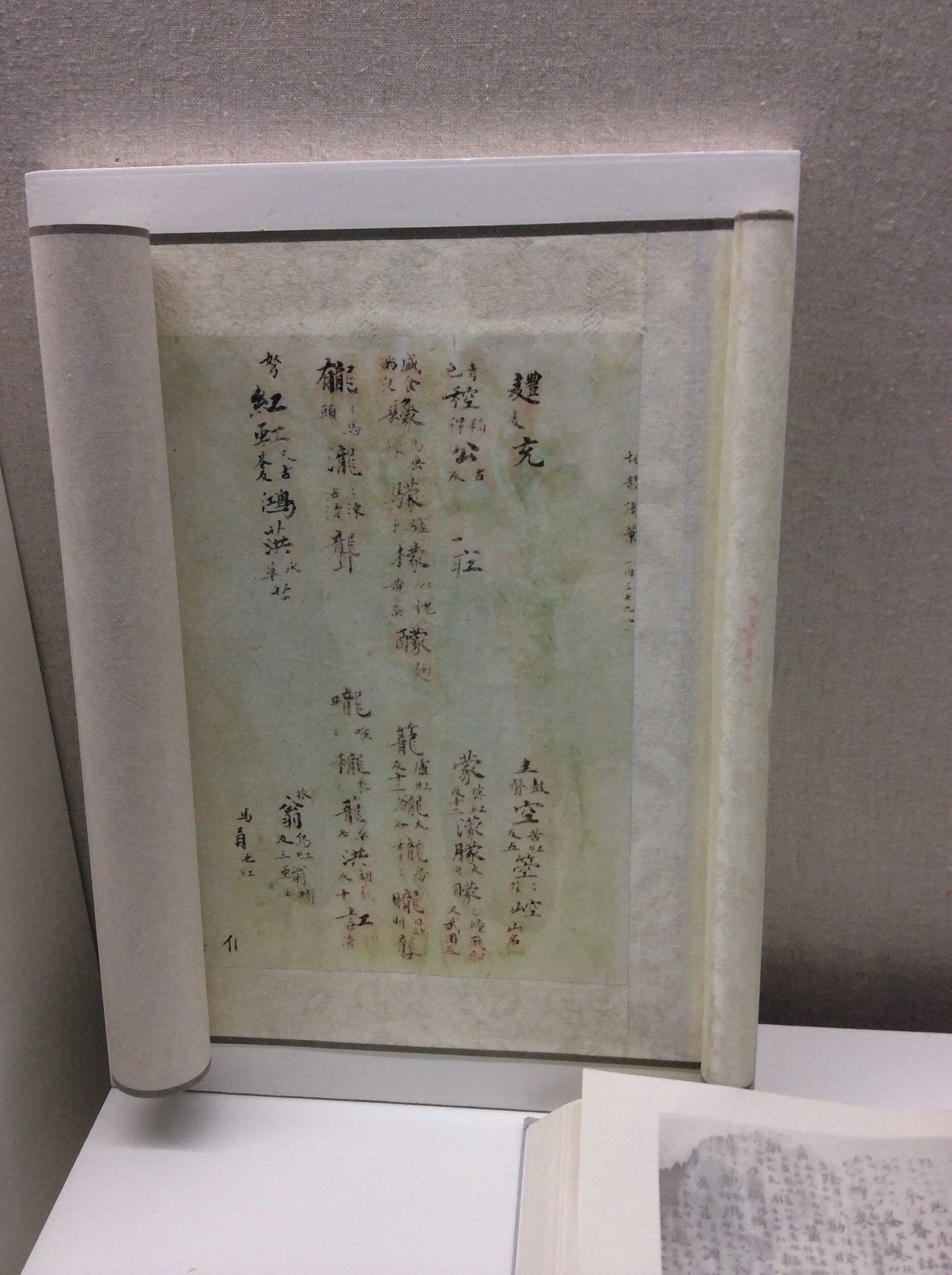
Lu Fayan's Qieyun rhyming dictionary

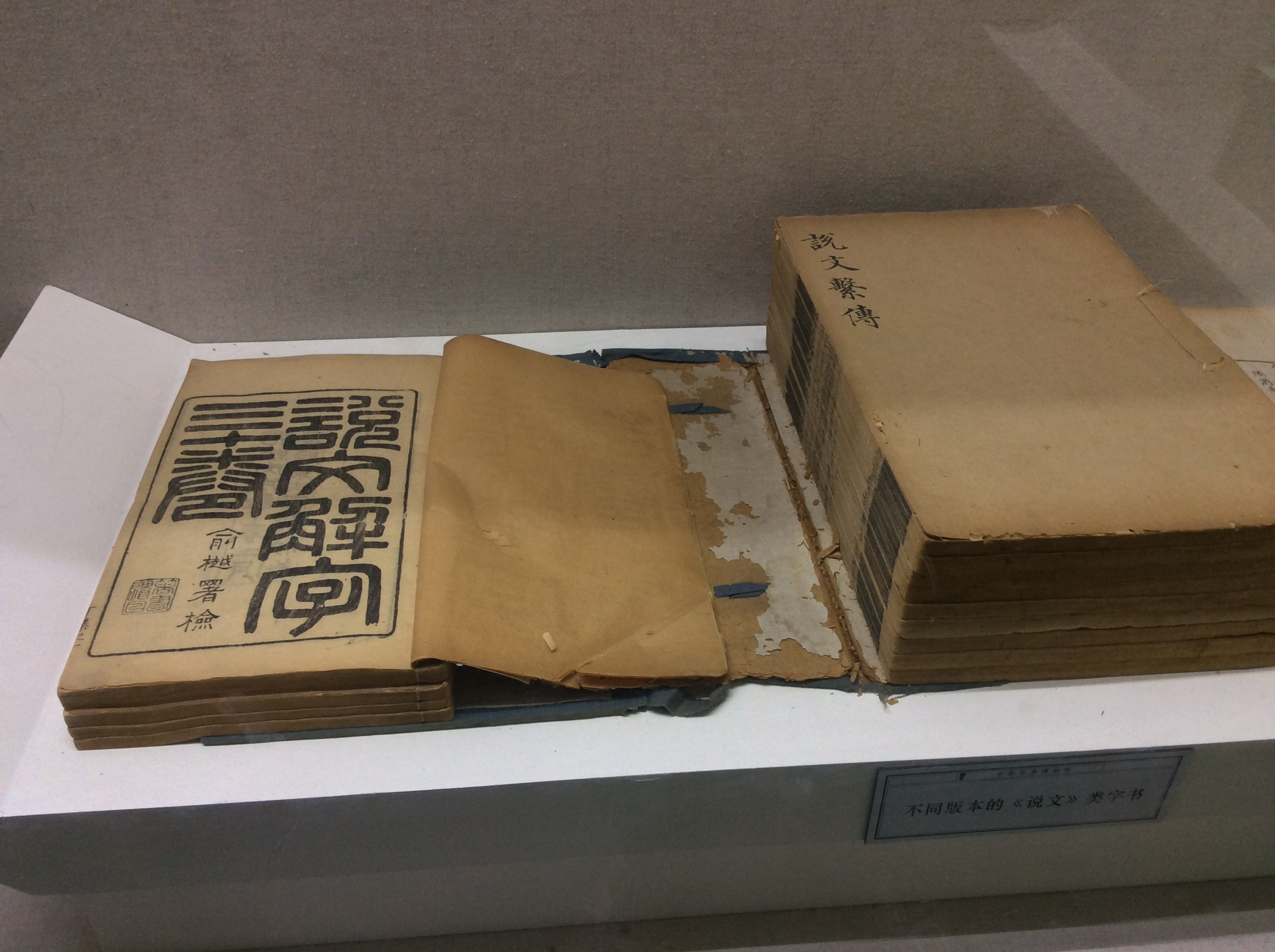
The Shuowen Jiezi

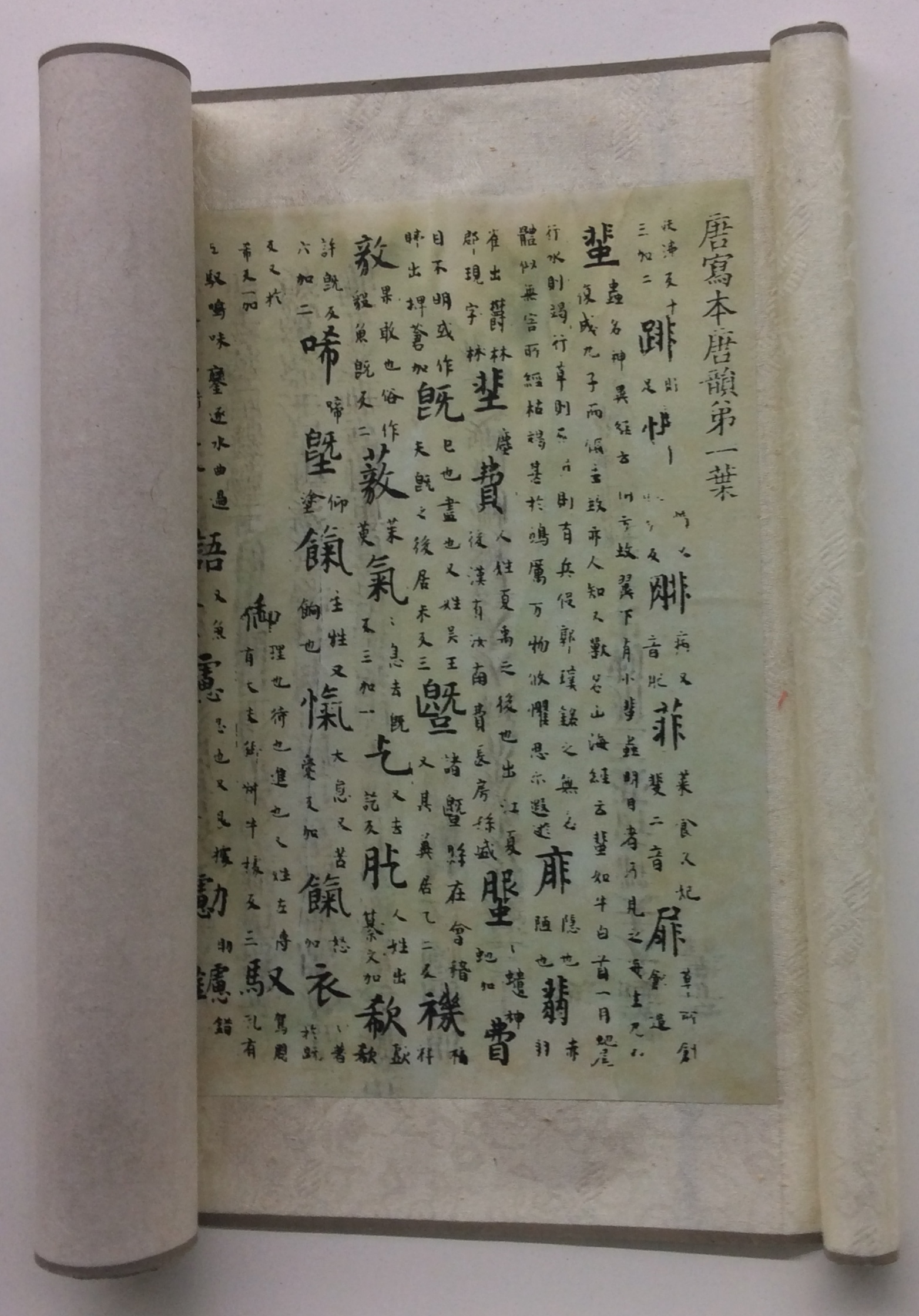
Sun Mian's Tangyun rhyming dictionary

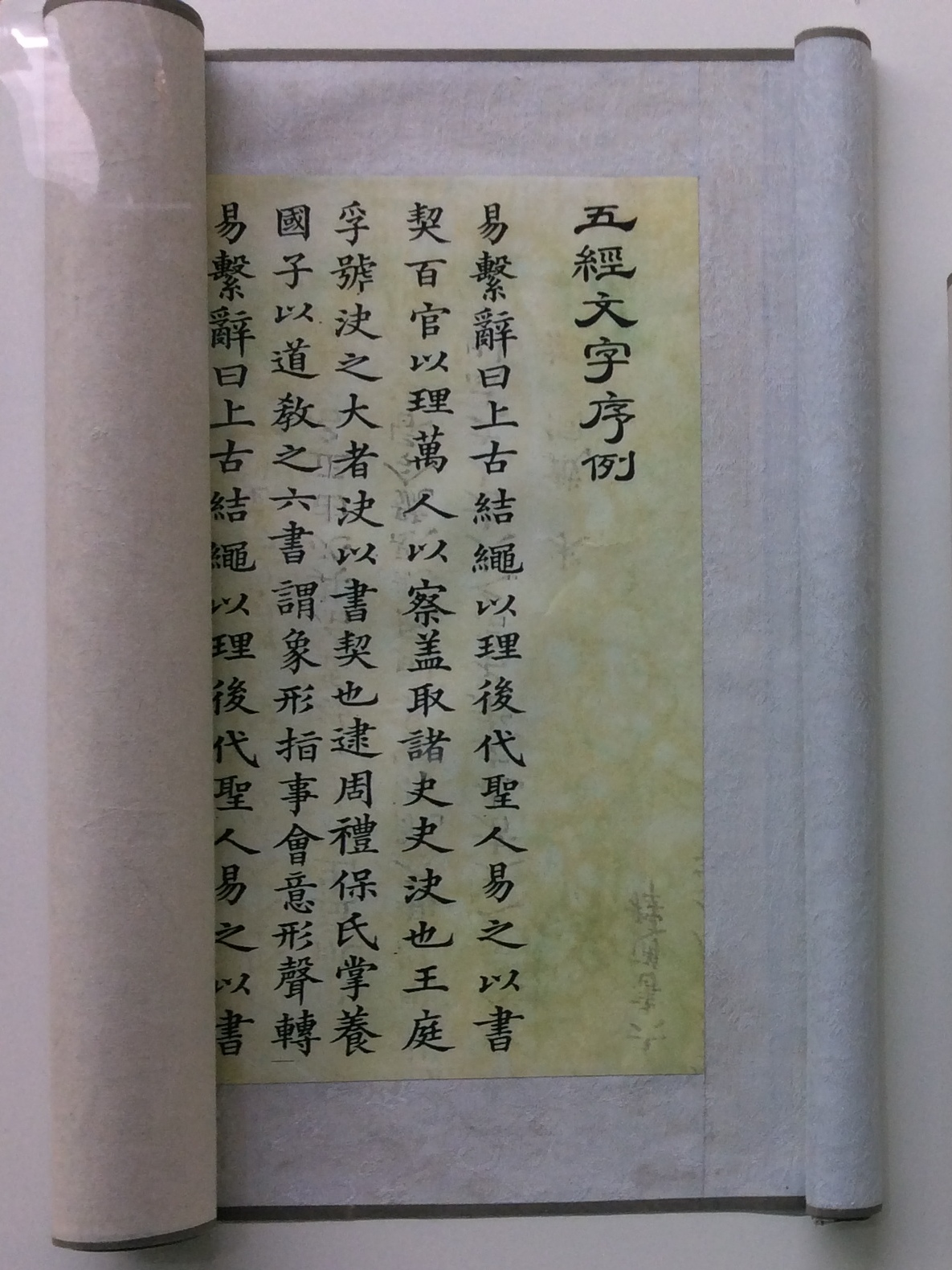
The Wujing Wenzi

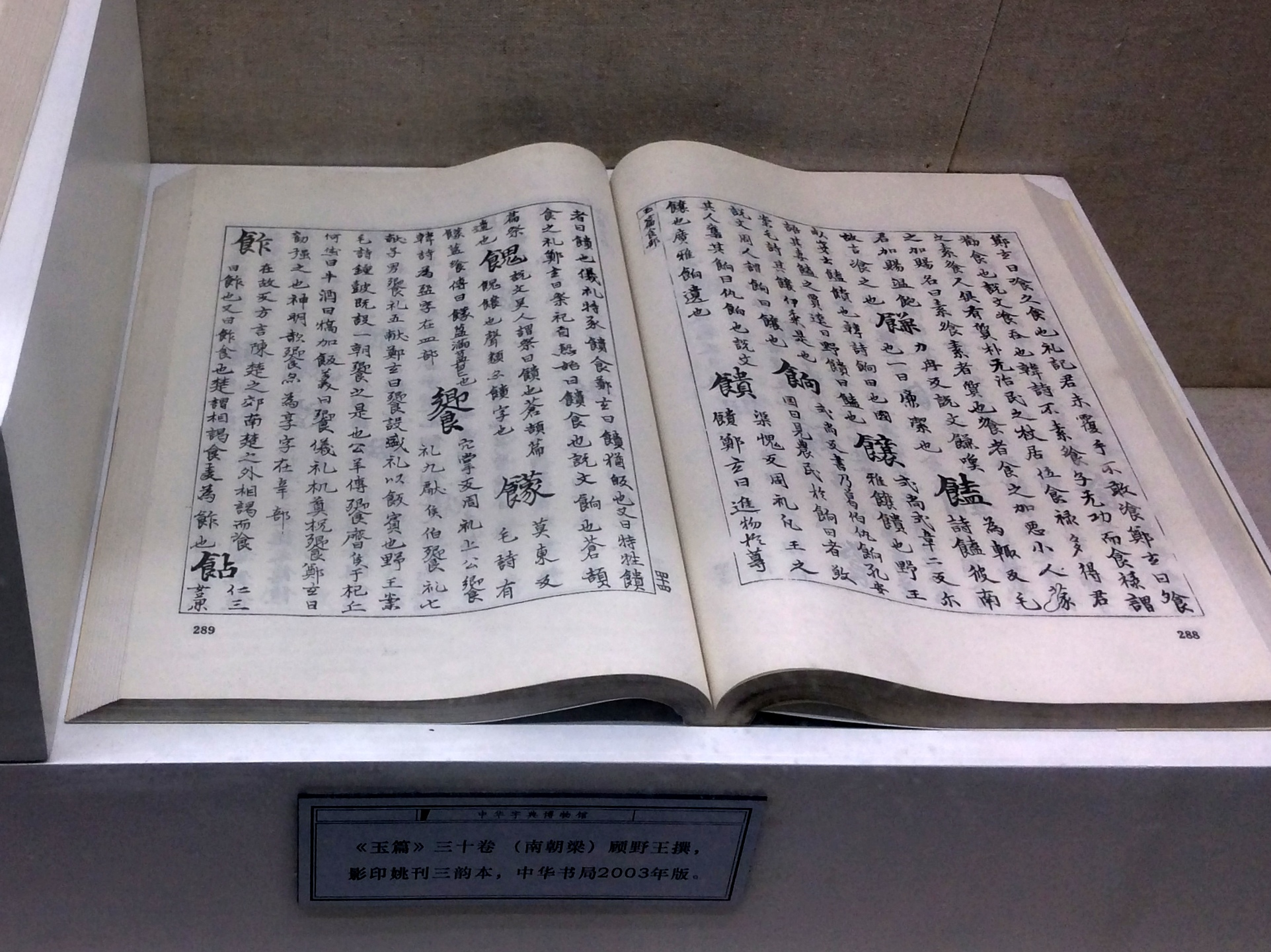
Gu Yewang's Yupian

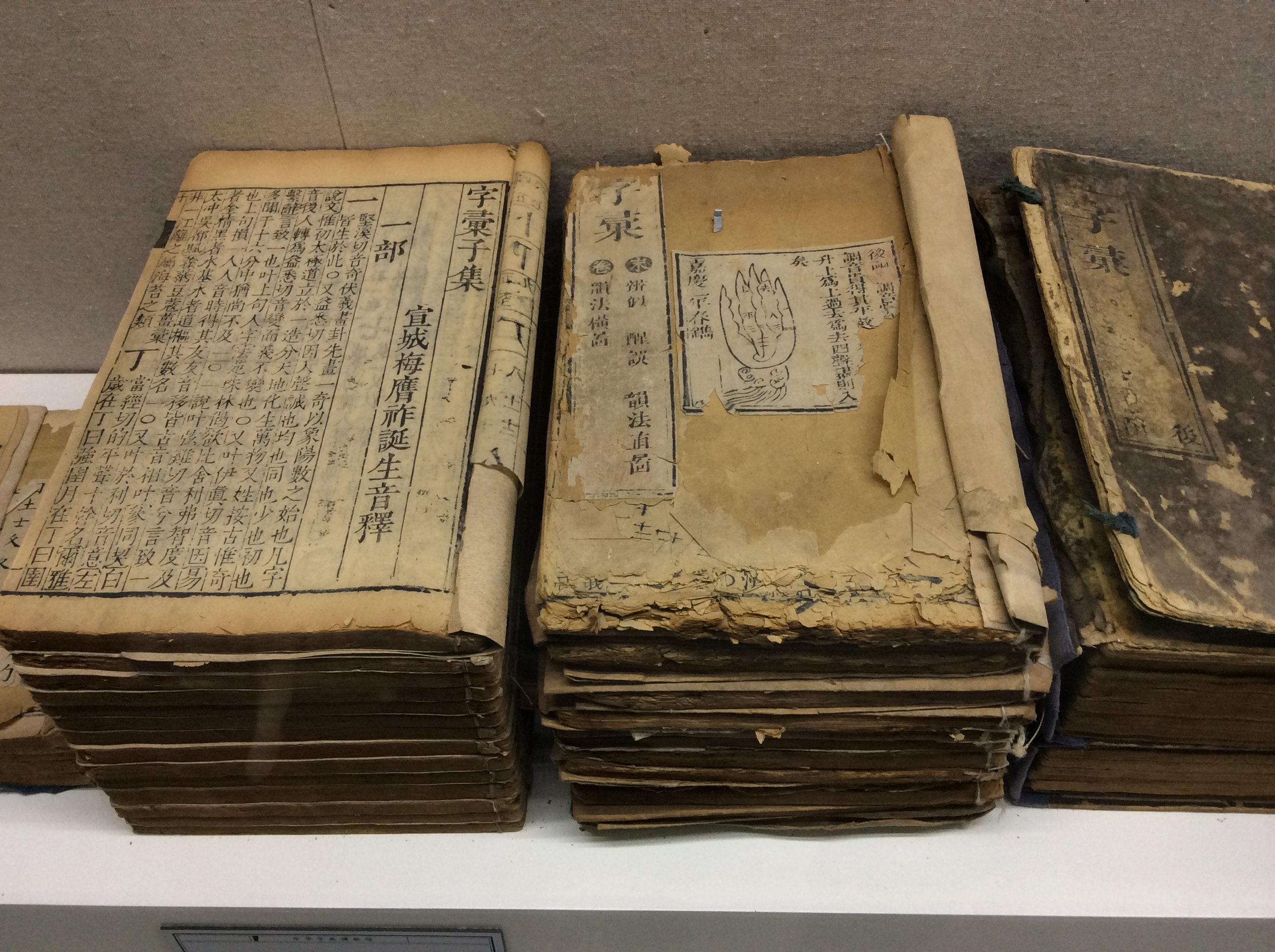
Mei Yingzuo's Zihui

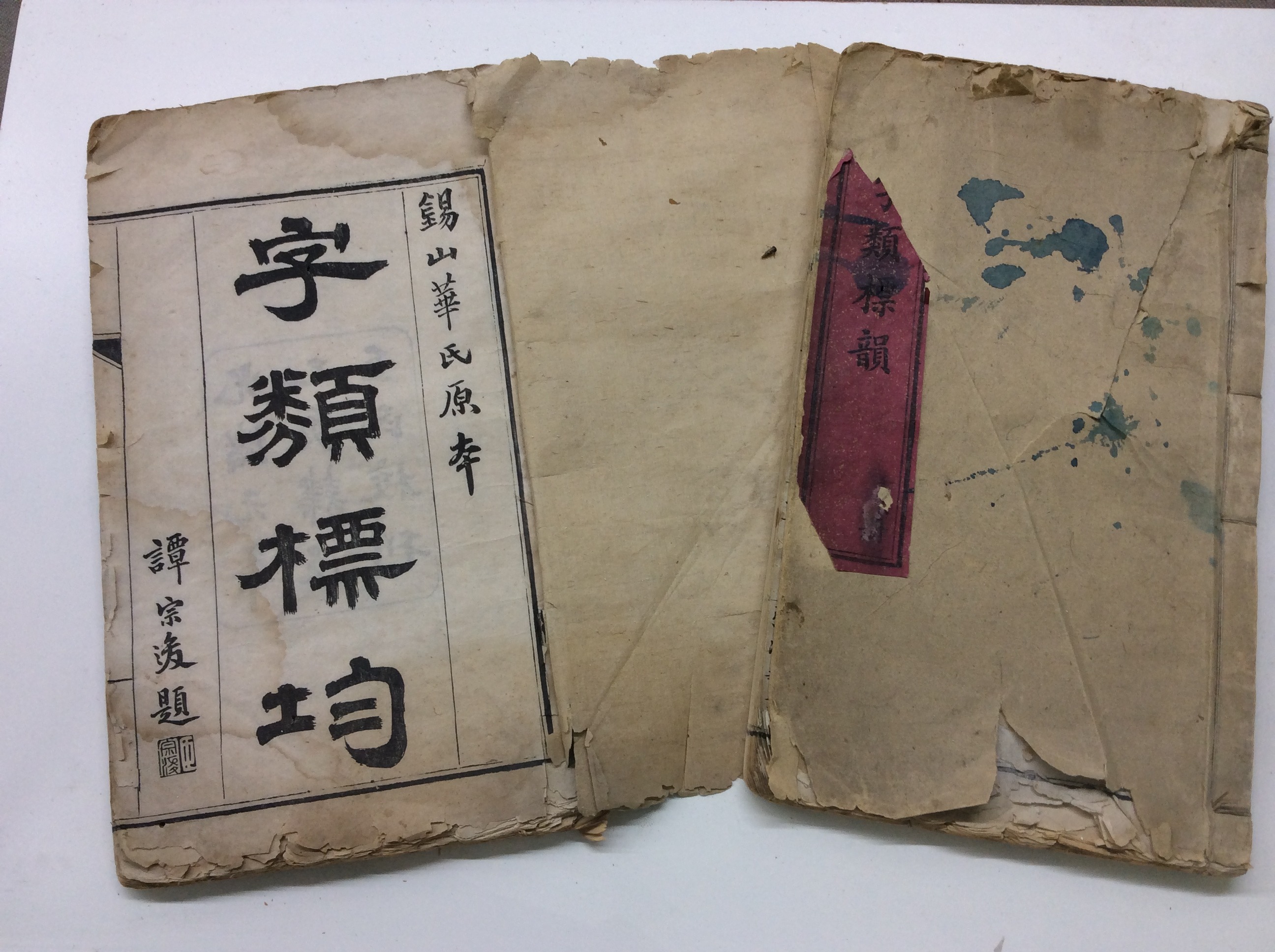
The Zilei Biaoyun

== In popular culture ==
Ten movies or television shows have been produced at the mansion since its reopening in 1998, including the 2001 CCTV drama Kangxi Dynasty.

== See also ==
- List of AAAAA-rated tourist attractions in the People's Republic of China
- Shanxi Courtyard Houses
