= Siheyuan =

Historical type of residence in China

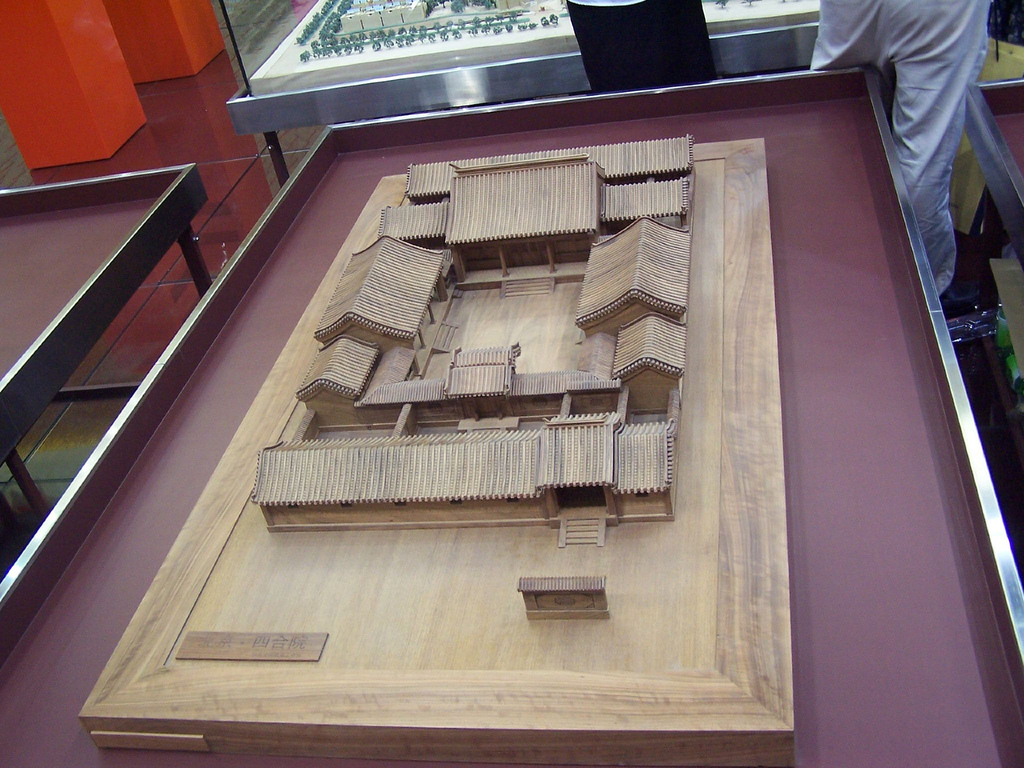
- A model siheyuan
- Chinese: 四合院
Transcriptions
Standard Mandarin
- Hanyu Pinyin: sìhéyuàn
- Bopomofo: ㄙˋ ㄏㄜˊ ㄩㄢˋ
- Wade–Giles: ssŭ^{4}-ho^{2}-yüan^{4}
- IPA: [sɹ̩̂.xɤ̌.ɥɛ̂n]
Yue: Cantonese
- Yale Romanization: seihahpjyuhn
- Jyutping: sei3-hap6-jyun6
- IPA: [sej˧.hɐp̚˨.jyn˨]

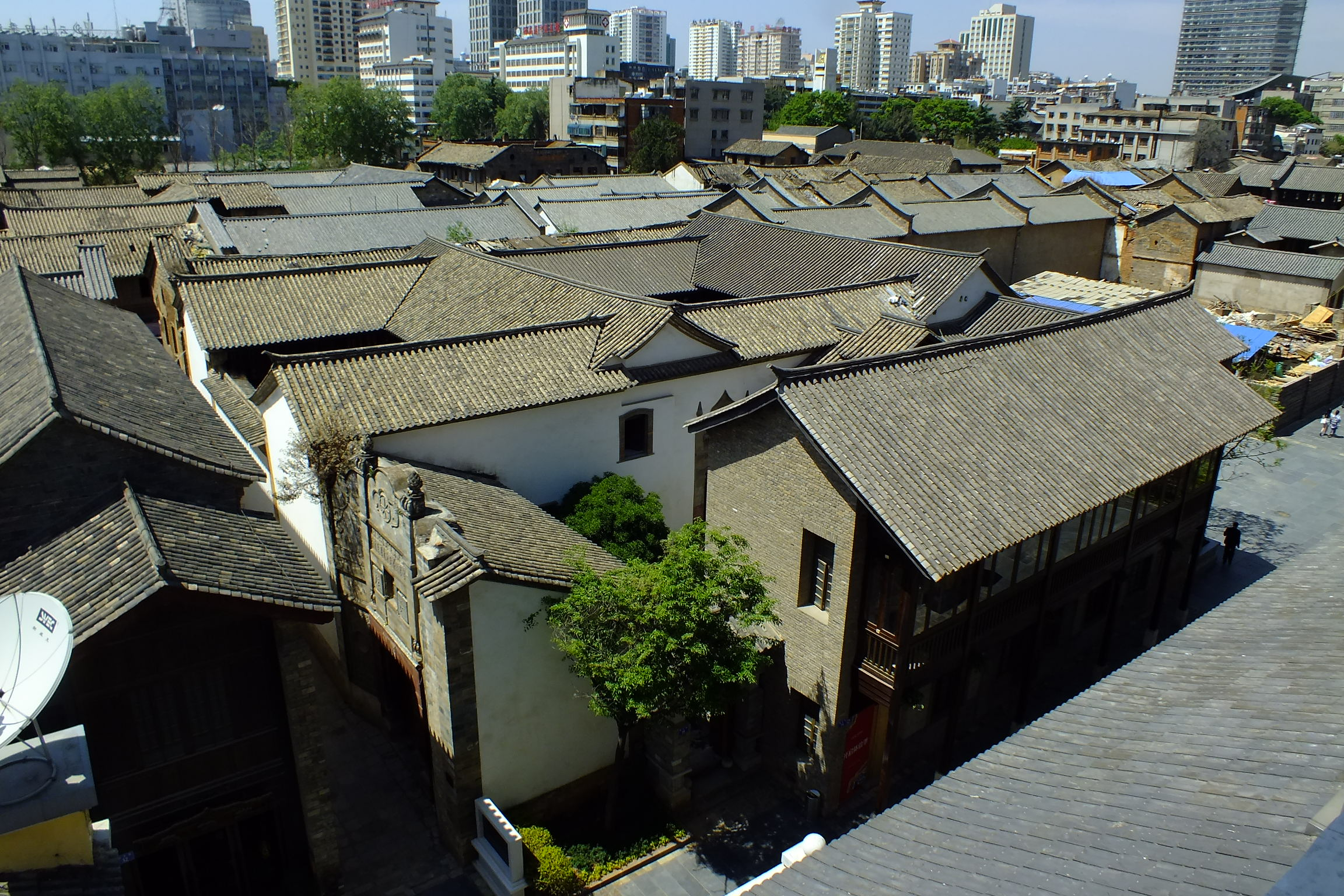
Yunnan, Kunming

A siheyuan (Chinese: 四合院; [sɹ̩̂.xɤ̌.ɥɛ̂n];Sìhéyuàn) is a traditional Chinese architectural style characterized by a courtyard enclosed by buildings on all four sides. This design was prevalent throughout northern China, notably in Beijing and rural Shanxi. Historically, siheyuan served as the foundational layout for various structures, including residences, palaces, temples, monasteries, family businesses, and government offices.

Siheyuan originated in the Han Dynasty (206 BCE – 220 CE) and became popular during the Ming (1368–1644) and Qing (1644–1912) dynasties. A spacious siheyuan would be occupied by a single, usually large and extended family, signifying wealth and prosperity. Today, remaining siheyuan are often still used as subdivided housing complexes, although many lack modern amenities.

As a courtyard surrounded by buildings on all four sides, siheyuan is also rendered in English as courtyard houses and Chinese quadrangles.

== History ==
The siheyuan dates back as early as the Western Zhou period and has a history of more than 2,000 years. They exhibit outstanding and fundamental characteristics of Chinese architecture. They exist all across China and are the template for most Chinese architectural styles. Siheyuan also serves as a cultural symbol of Beijing and a window into its old ways of life.

Modern Beijing's population boom has made housing one of city's biggest challenges. Siheyuan today are typically used as housing complexes, hosting multiple families, with courtyards being developed to provide extra living space. The living conditions in many siheyuan are quite poor, with very few having private toilets. In the 1990s, systematic demolition of old urban buildings took place in Beijing under rapid economic development. Many siheyuan are being torn down to address the problem of overcrowding, and have been replaced by modern apartment blocks.

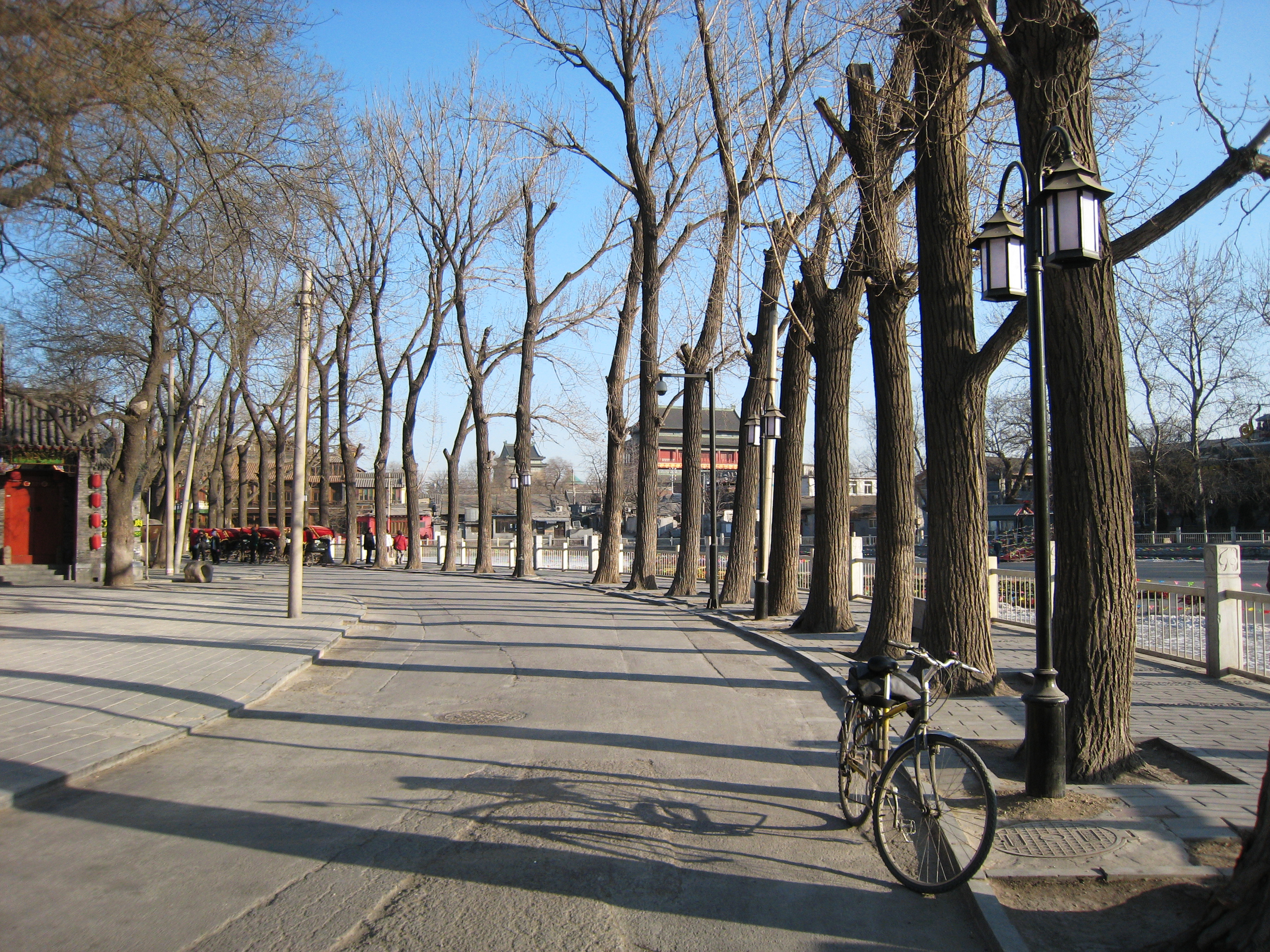
Beijing's Xicheng District with the Gulou and Zhonglou bell and drum towers viewed from a distance; this area is known for its concentration of historic siheyuans (courtyard houses).

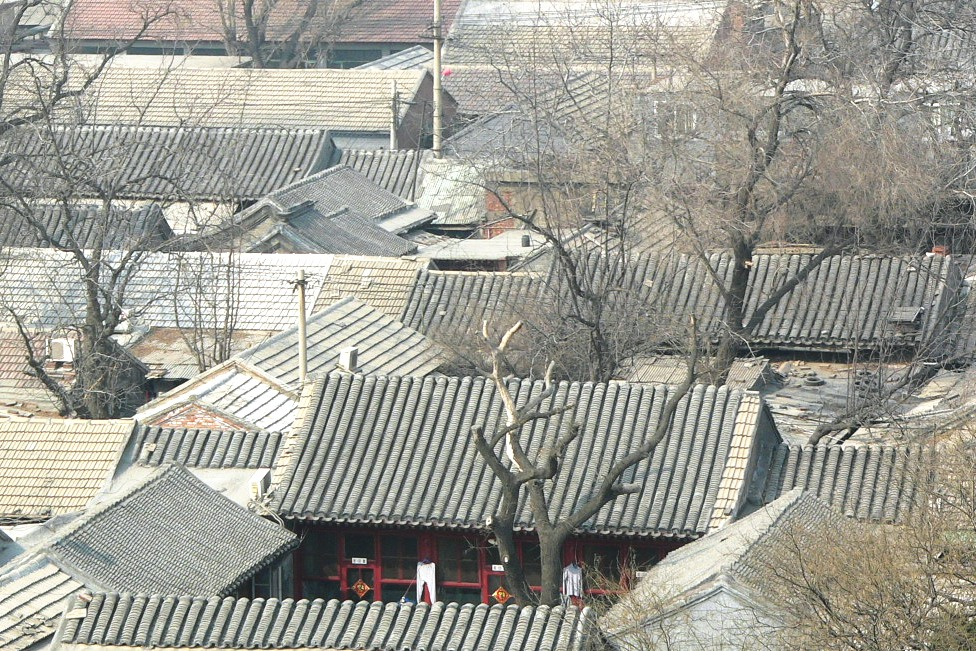
View of a section of a siheyuan neighborhood in Beijing

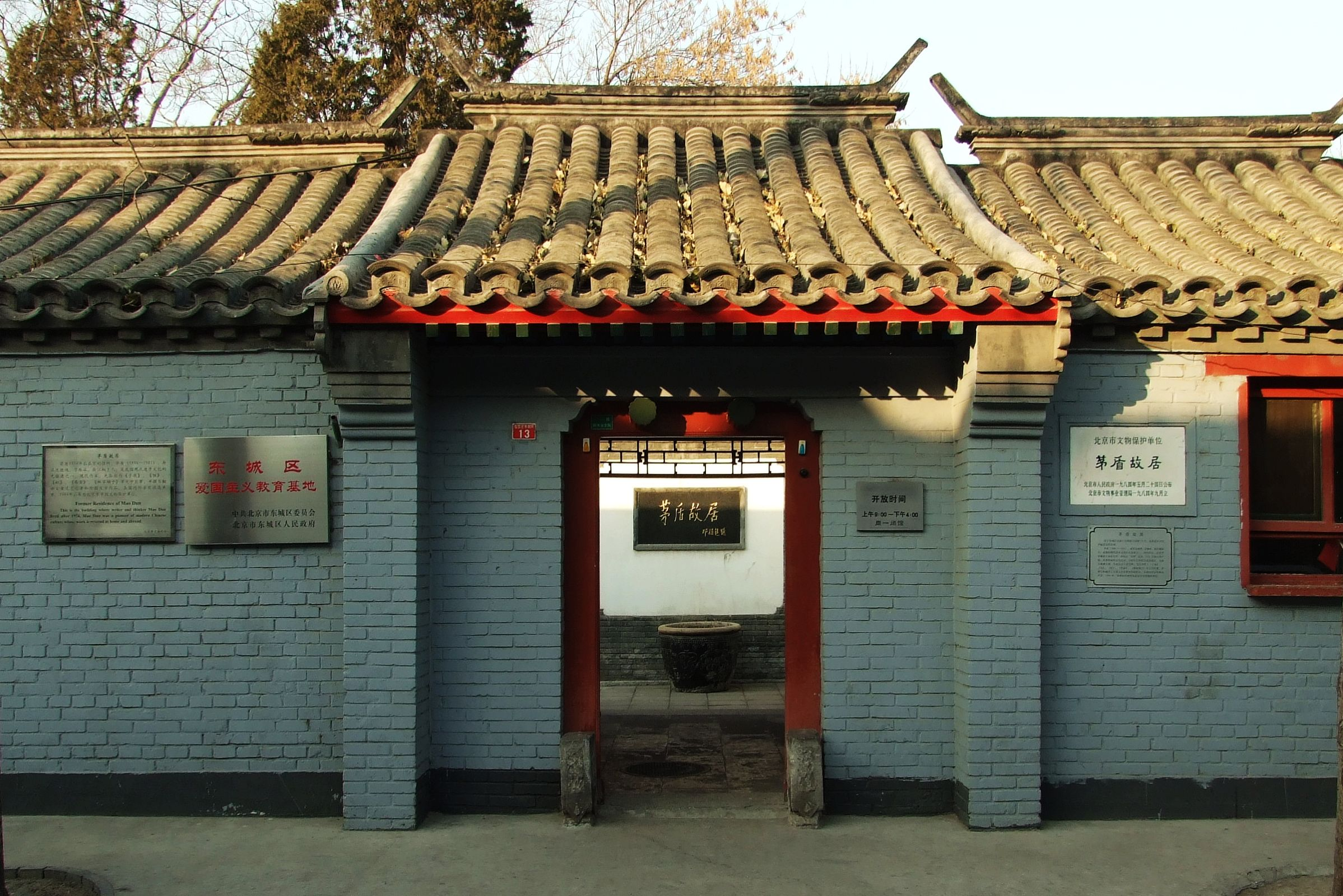
The Mao Dun Memorial in Tongxiang City, Zhejiang Province.

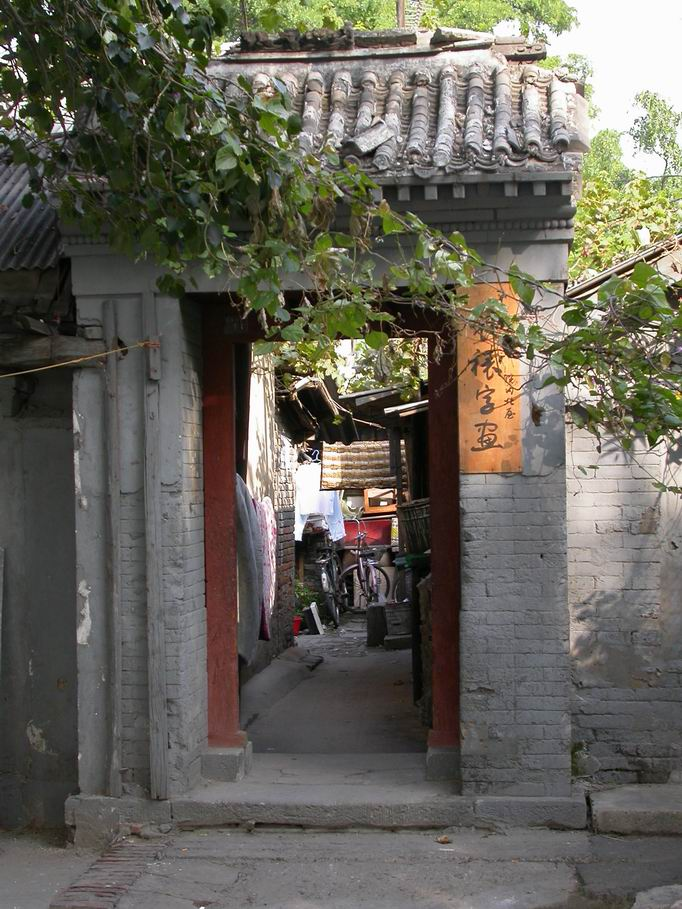
A gate into a siheyuan; the style of the gate indicates that it belongs to a lower-middle class urban family.

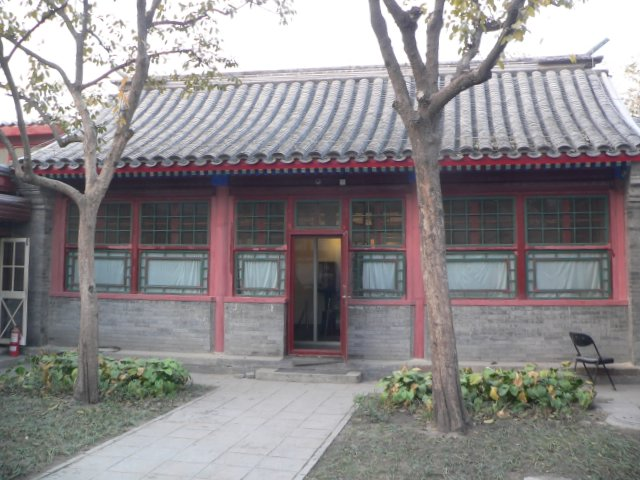
Lao She Memorial

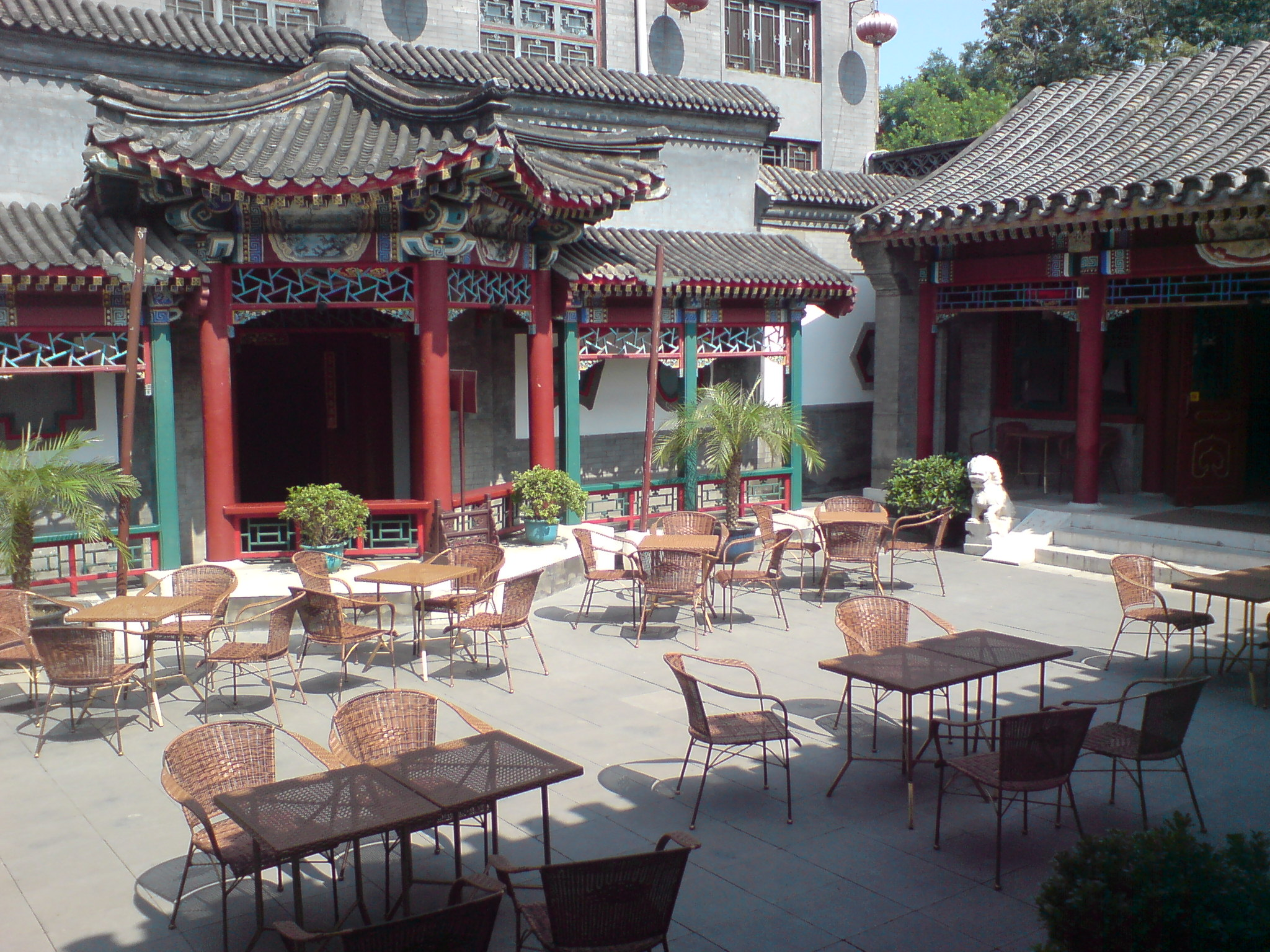
A traditional-style hotel in Beijing. Some of Beijing's historic siheyuans have been purchased and renovated by hotel chains and now function as hotels.

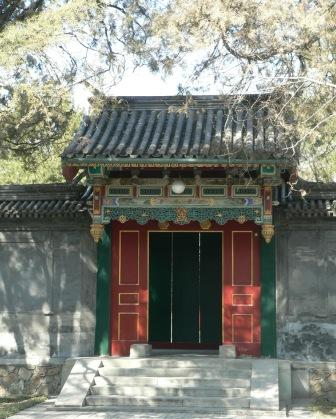
Siheyuan belonging to the wealthy usually feature an elaborate doorway

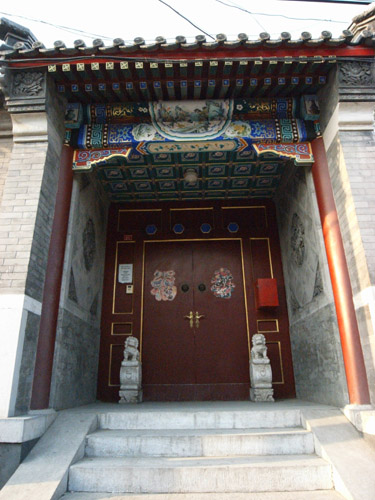
An example of upscale siheyuan

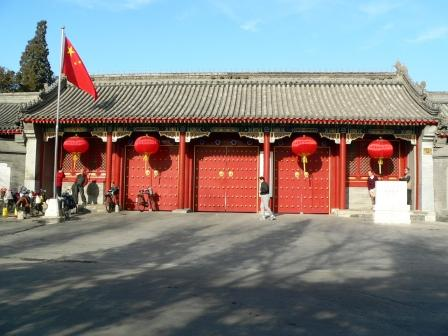
The large front gate of the Prince Chun Mansion

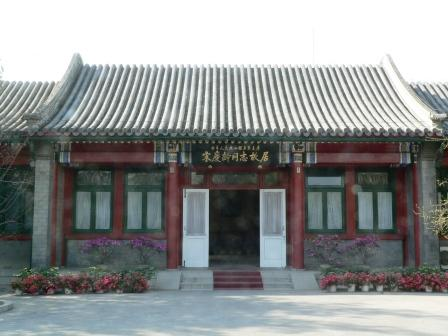
The Former Residence of Soong Ching-ling

== Present ==
According to the Beijing Municipal Administration of Cultural Heritage, there are over 500 historic courtyards preserved in the Cultural and Historical Conservation Areas as important cultural monuments. Many of these are public museums, and preserved historical siheyuans include Lu Xun Memorial, Guo Moruo Memorial, Mao Dun Memorial, Mei Lanfang Memorial, Lao She Memorial and many others. A 2008 study by the United Nations found that there were still about 400,000 residential courtyards remaining in Beijing. The sales market of siheyuan has also been booming in recent years. A report in 2005 finds there are usually around 7,000 to 9,000 residential siheyuans that are on the market for sale, and many are generally priced at 7,000 to 10,000 yuan per square meter. However, the prices vary based on the area and the market. For residential siheyuans in the Dongcheng and Xicheng districts in 2009, the prices can go up to 40,000 yuan per square meter. For siheyuans near the Houhai and Shichahai area, the prices can go up to between 100,000 and 150,000 yuan per square meter. A 2,000 square meter siheyuan near the Shichahai area was sold for 40 million yuan ($6 million) in 2005.

== Layout of Beijing siheyuan ==
The four buildings of a siheyuan are normally positioned along the north–south and east–west axis. The building positioned to the north and facing the south is considered the main house (正房, zhèngfáng). The buildings adjoining the main house and facing east and west are called side houses (廂房, xiāngfáng). The northern, eastern and western buildings are connected by beautifully decorated pathways (抄手游廊, chāoshǒu yóuláng). These passages serve as shelters from the sunshine during the day, and provide a cool place to appreciate the view of the courtyard at night. The building that faces north is known as the opposite house (倒座房, dàozuòfáng). Behind the main house, there would often be a separate backside building (后罩房, hòuzhàofáng), the only place where two-story buildings are allowed to be constructed for the traditional siheyuan.

The entrance gate, usually painted vermilion and with copper door knockers on it, is usually at the southeastern corner. Normally, there is a screen wall (影壁, yǐngbì) inside the gate for privacy. Superstition holds that it also protects the house from evil spirits. A pair of stone lions are often placed outside the gate. Some large siheyuan compounds would have two or more layers of courtyards and even private gardens attached to them. Such is a sign of wealth and status in ancient times.

The courtyard dwellings were built according to the traditional concepts of the five elements that were believed to compose the universe, and the eight diagrams of divination. The gate was made at the southeast corner which was the “wind” corner, and the main house was built on the north side which was believed to belong to "water", an element to prevent fire.

The layout of a simple courtyard represents traditional Chinese morality and Confucian ethics. In Beijing, four buildings in a single courtyard receive different amounts of sunlight. The northern main building receives the most, thus serving as the living room and bedroom of the owner or head of the family. The eastern and western side buildings receive less, and serve as the rooms for children or less important members of the family. The southern building receives the least sunlight (it is the most shaded by the walls of the siheyuan), and usually functions as a reception room and the servants' dwelling, or where the family would gather to relax, eat or study. The backside building is for unmarried daughters and female servants: because unmarried girls were not allowed direct exposure to the public, they occupied the most secluded building in the siheyuan.

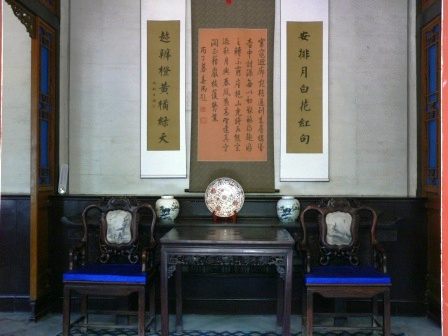
Furnishings of the main hall at Yishensuo, Prince Gong's Mansion, Beijing

A more detailed and further stratified Confucian order was followed in ancient China. The main house in the north was assigned to the eldest member of the family, i.e. the head of the family, usually grandparents. If the main house had enough rooms, a central room would serve as a shrine for ancestral worship. When the head of the household had concubines, the wife would reside in the room to the eastern end of the main house, while the concubines would reside in the room to the western end of the main house. The eldest son of the family and his wife would reside in the eastern side house, while the younger son and his wife would reside in the western side house. If a grandson was fully grown, he would reside in the opposite house in the south. Unmarried daughters would always reside in the backside building behind the main house.

When a funeral is held in a siheyuan, the location of the casket depends on the status of the deceased, but all caskets are oriented so that the head of the deceased points south while the feet point north. If the deceased is the head of the household or his wife, then the casket would be on the center line in the main house. If the deceased was the concubine of the head of the household, her casket would remain in the main house, but could not be in the center. If the deceased is a younger male, then his casket is placed on the center line of the courtyard. If the deceased is a younger female, her casket is placed in the courtyard but cannot be on the center line.

Though from antiquity, a siheyuan is a practically sound, engineered structure. Northwestern walls are usually higher than the other walls to protect the inside buildings from the harsh winds blowing across northern China in the winter. Eaves curve downward, so that rainwater will flow along the curve rather than dropping straight down. The rooftop is ridged to provide shade in the summer while retaining warmth in the winter.

A siheyuan offers space, comfort, quiet and privacy. Siheyuan walls provide security as well as protection against dust and storms. With plants, rocks, and flowers, the yard is also a garden, and acts like an open-air living room. The veranda divides the courtyard into several big and small spaces that are not very distant from each other. Family members talked with each other here, creating a cordial atmosphere.

== Siheyuan in other areas ==
In Gansu, Qinghai and other northwest regions, where dust storms are very strong, courtyard walls tend to be higher. The shapes of siheyuan are also altered: in northwestern China, the north–south span of a siheyuan is generally much longer than the east–west span, while in other provinces such as Sichuan, the opposite is true. In southern China, the houses are built with multiple stories. In the northeast, land is abundant but the weather is cold, so courtyards are built broad and large to increase the exposure to sunlight, and there are more open areas inside the walls.

== Neo-siheyuan style ==
Recently, a modern version of siheyuan has been developed as a villa product in large scale planned residential communities of China. These new siheyuan are located in new housing development areas of Beijing. In the historic center of Beijing modern siheyuans have been constructed in the period since 2005 using the courtyard concept and ostensibly many of the features of the traditional Beijing house, but using modern techniques and concrete blocks with 'faux' brick facing instead of the traditional carefully laid wide grey Chinese bricks; plastic coated window frames and beams instead of the traditional wood ones coated in natural wood lacquer.

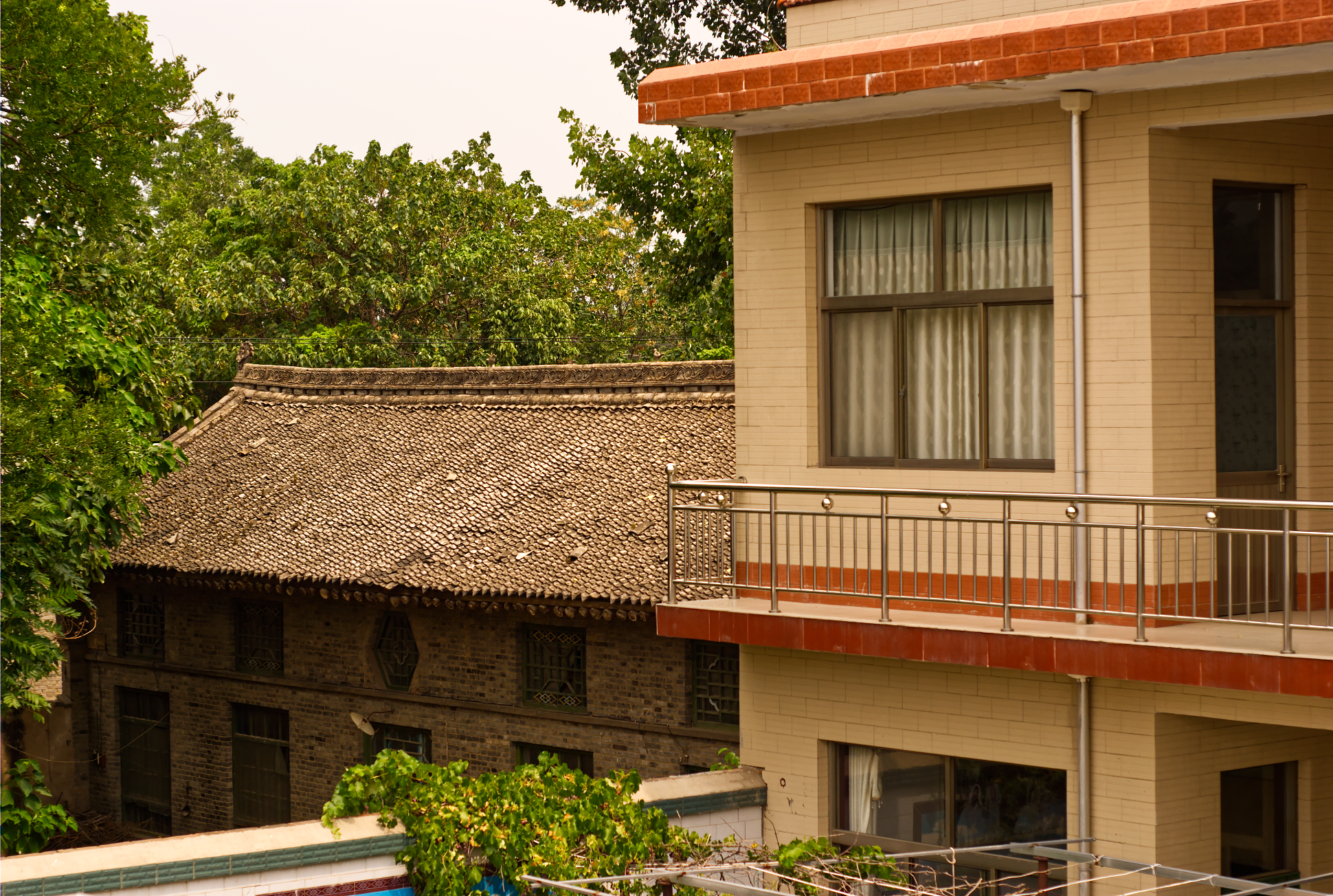
Modern courtyard house built as an extension to an old courtyard house, in rural Shanxi Province, 2017

== See also ==
- Hutong
- Sanheyuan
- Shanxi Courtyard Houses & House of the Huangcheng Chancellor
- Tulou
