= List of village-level divisions of Shanxi =

Location of Shanxi province in China

This is a list of village-level divisions of the province of Shanxi, People's Republic of China. After province, prefecture, county-level divisions, and township-level divisions, village-level divisions constitute the formal fifth-level administrative divisions of the PRC. There are a total of 1,391 such divisions in Shanxi, divided into 195 subdistricts, 568 towns and 628 townships. This list is divided first into the prefecture-level, then the county-level divisions, then township-level divisions.

== Taiyuan ==
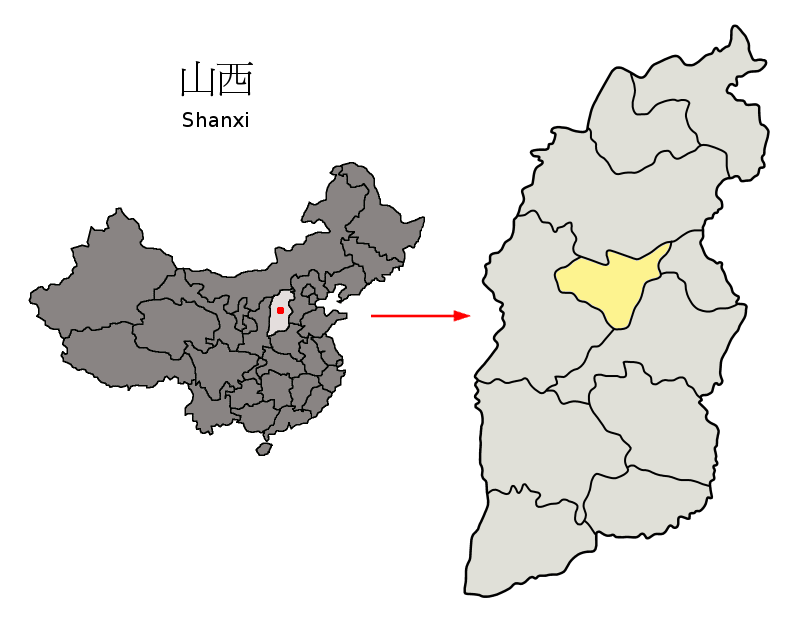
Location of Taiyuan in the province

=== Jiancaoping District ===
Subdistricts:

- Chaicun Subdistrict (柴村街道), Guangshe Subdistrict (光社街道), Shanglan Subdistrict (上兰街道), Nanzhai Subdistrict (南寨街道), Yingxin Avenue Subdistrict (迎新街街道), Jiancaoping Subdistrict (尖草坪街道), Huifeng Subdistrict (汇丰街道), Xincheng Subdistrict (新城街道), Gucheng Subdistrict (古城街道)

Towns:

- Xiangyang (向阳镇), Yangqu (阳曲镇)

Townships:

- Matoushui Township (马头水乡), Baiban Township (柏板乡), Xiqi Township (西焉乡)

=== Jinyuan District ===
Subdistricts:

- Jinyuan Subdistrict (晋源街道), Yijing Subdistrict (义井街道), Luocheng Subdistrict (罗城街道)

Towns:

- Jinci (晋祠镇), Jinsheng (金胜镇), Yaocun (姚村镇)

=== Wanbailin District ===
Subdistricts:

- Qianfeng Subdistrict (千峰街道), Xiayuan Subdistrict (下元街道), Heping Subdistrict (和平街道), Shentanggou Subdistrict (神堂沟街道), Wanbailin Subdistrict (万柏林街道), Du'erping Subdistrict (杜儿坪街道), Ximing Subdistrict (西铭街道), Nanhan Subdistrict (南寒街道), Dongshe Subdistrict (东社街道), Huaketou Subdistrict (化客头街道), Xiaojingyu Subdistrict (小井峪街道), Baijiazhuang Subdistrict (白家庄街道), West Changfeng Avenue Subdistrict (长风西街街道), Xinghua Subdistrict (兴华街道)

The only township is Wangfeng Township (王封乡)

=== Xiaodian District ===
Subdistricts:

- Xiaodian Subdistrict (小店街道), Wucheng Subdistrict (坞城街道), Beiying Subdistrict (北营街道), Yingpan Subdistrict (营盘街道), Pingyang Road Subdistrict (平阳路街道), Huangling Subdistrict (黄陵街道)

The only town is Beige (北格镇)

Townships:

- Xiwenzhuang Township (西温庄乡), Liujiabao Township (刘家堡乡)

=== Xinghualing District ===
Subdistricts:

- Julun Subdistrict (巨轮街道), Sanqiao Subdistrict (三桥街道), Balingqiao Subdistrict (坝陵桥街道), Xinghualing Subdistrict (杏花岭街道), Dadongguan Subdistrict (大东关街道), Zhigong New Village Subdistrict (职工新村街道), Gulou Subdistrict (鼓楼街道), Jianhe Subdistrict (涧河街道), Dunhuafang Subdistrict (敦化坊街道), Yangjiayu Subdistrict (杨家峪街道)

Townships:

- Zhongjianhe Township (中涧河乡), Xiaofan Township (小返乡)

=== Yingze District ===
Subdistricts:

- Yingze Subdistrict (迎泽街道), Qiaodong Subdistrict (桥东街道), Wenmiao Subdistrict (文庙街道), Liuxiang Subdistrict (柳巷街道), Laojunying Subdistrict (老军营街道), Miaoqian Subdistrict (庙前街道)

The only town is Haozhuang (郝庄镇)

=== Gujiao ===
Subdistricts:

- Dongqu Subdistrict (东曲街道), Xiqu Subdistrict (西曲街道), Taoyuan Subdistrict (桃园街道), Tunlan Subdistrict (屯兰街道)

Towns:

- Hekou (河口镇), Zhenchengdi (镇城底镇), Malan (马兰镇)

Townships:

- Geshang Township (阁上乡), Jialequan Township (加乐泉乡), Suoyu Township (梭峪乡), Chakou Township (岔口乡), Chang'an Township (常安乡), Yuanxiang Township (原相乡), Xingjiashe Township (邢家社乡)

=== Loufan County ===
Towns:

- Loufan (娄烦镇), Dujiaoqu (杜交曲镇), Jingyou (静游镇)

Townships:

- Miaowan Township (庙湾乡), Majiazhuang Township (马家庄乡), Shanjiazhuang Township (盖家庄乡), Miyuzhen Township (米峪镇乡), Tianchi Township (天池乡)

=== Qingxu County ===
Towns:

- Qingyuan (清源镇), Dongyu (东于镇), Xugou (徐沟镇), Mengfeng (孟封镇)

Townships:

- Mayu Township (马峪乡), Liudu Township (柳杜乡), Xigu Township (西谷乡), Wangda Township (王答乡), Jiyi Township (集义乡)

=== Yangqu County ===
Towns:

- Huangzhai (黄寨镇), Donghuangshui (东黄水镇), Dayu (大盂镇), Nitun (泥屯镇)

Townships:

- Houcun Township (侯村乡), Lingjingdian Township (凌井店乡), Gaocun Township (高村乡), Yangxing Township (杨兴乡), Xilingjing Township (西凌井乡), Beixiaodian Township (北小店乡)

== Changzhi ==
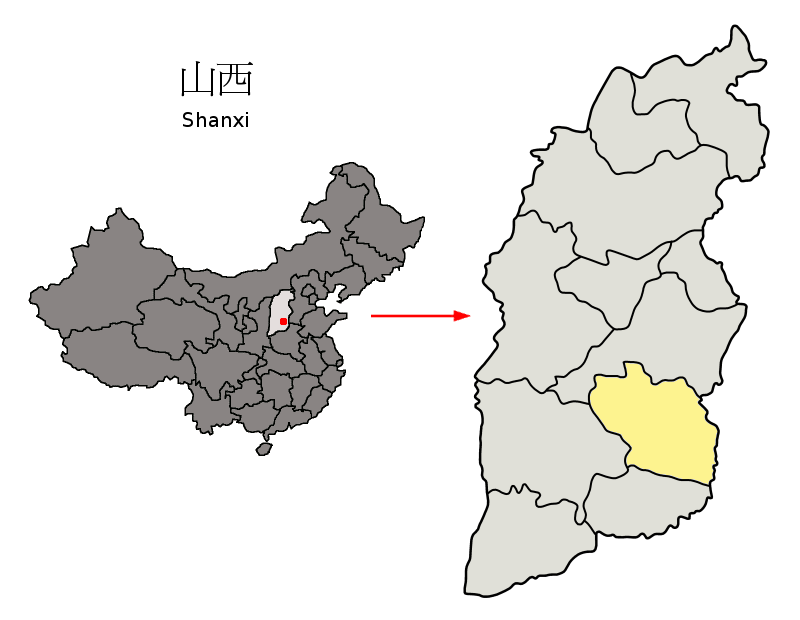
Location of Changzhi in the province

=== Chengqu, Changzhi ===
Subdistricts:

- East Taihang Avenue Subdistrict (太行东街街道), Beidong Subdistrict (北董街道), Wuma Subdistrict (五马街道), Xijie Subdistrict (西街街道), Beiguan Subdistrict (北关街道), Wuyi Road Subdistrict (五一路街道), West Taihang Avenue Subdistrict (太行西街街道), Yingxiong Subdistrict (英雄街道), Nanjie Subdistrict (南街街道), Dongjie Subdistrict (东街街道)

=== Jiaoqu, Changzhi ===
Subdistricts:

- Changbei Subdistrict (长北街道), Guxian Subdistrict (故县街道)

Towns:

- Laodingshan (老顶山镇), Houbeizhuang (堠北庄镇), Daxinzhuang (大辛庄镇), Machang (马厂镇), Huangnian (黄碾镇)

The only township is Xibaitu Township (西白兔乡)

=== Lucheng ===
Subdistricts:

- Luhua Subdistrict (潞华街道), Chengjiachuan Subdistrict (成家川街道)

Towns:

- Dianshang (店上镇), Weizi (微子镇), Xin'anquan (辛安泉镇), Zhaidian (翟店镇)

Townships:

- Heshi Township (合室乡), Huangniuti Township (黄牛蹄乡), Shijiong Township (史迥乡)

=== Changzhi County ===
Towns:

- Handian (韩店镇), Sudian (苏店镇), Mengcheng (萌城镇), Xihuo (西火镇), Bayi (八义镇), Jiazhang (贾掌镇)

Townships:

- Haojiazhuang Township (郝家庄乡), Xichi Township (西池乡), Beicheng Township (北呈乡), Donghe Township (东和乡), Nansong Township (南宋乡)

=== Huguan County ===
Towns:

- Longquan (龙泉镇), Baichi (百尺镇), Dianshang (店上镇), Jinzhuang (晋庄镇), Shuzhang (树掌镇)

Townships:

- Jidian Township (集店乡), Huangshan Township (黄山乡), Dongjingling Township (东井岭乡), Shipo Township (石坡乡), Wulongshan Township (五龙山乡), Eceng Township (鹅屋乡), Qiaoshang Township (桥上乡)

=== Licheng County ===
Towns:

- Lihou (黎侯镇), Shangyao (上遥镇), Xijing (西井镇), Huangyadong (黄崖洞镇), Dongyangguan (东阳关镇)

Townships:

- Tinghepu Township (停河铺乡), Xixu Township (西仵乡), Chengjiashan Township (程家山乡), Hongjing Township (洪井乡)

=== Pingshun County ===
Towns:

- Qingyang (青羊镇), Longxi (龙溪镇), Shicheng (石城镇), Miaozhuang (苗庄镇), Xingcheng (杏城镇)

Townships:

- Xigou Township (西沟乡), Dongsitou Township (东寺头乡), Hongtiguan Township (虹梯关乡), Yanggao Township (阳高乡), Beidanche Township (北耽车乡), Zhongwujing Township (中五井乡), Beishe Township (北社乡)

=== Qin County ===
Towns:

- Dingchang (定昌镇), Guocun (郭村镇), Guxian (故县镇), Xindian (新店镇), Zhangyuan (漳源镇), Cecun (册村镇)

Townships:

- Duanliu Township (段柳乡), Songcun Township (松村乡), Cicun Township (次村乡), Niusi Township (牛寺乡), Nanli Township (南里乡), Nanquan Township (南泉乡), Yang'an Township (杨安乡)

=== Qinyuan County ===
Towns:

- Qinhe (沁河镇), Guodao (郭道镇), Lingkongshan (灵空山镇), Wanghe (王和镇), Liyuan (李元镇)

Townships:

- Zhongyu Township (中峪乡), Fazhong Township (法中乡), Jiaokou Township (交口乡), Congziyu Township (聪子峪乡), Hanhong Township (韩洪乡), Guantan Township (官滩乡), Jingfeng Township (景风乡), Chishiqiao Township (赤石桥乡), Wangtao Township (王陶乡)

=== Tunliu County ===
Towns:

- Qijiang (麒绛镇), Shangcun (上村镇), Yuze (渔泽镇), Yuwu (余吾镇), Wuyuan (吾元镇), Zhangdian (张店镇), Fengyi (丰宜镇)

Townships:

- Ligao Township (李高乡), Lucun Township (路村乡), Xijia Township (西贾乡), Heshenmiao Township (河神庙乡)

=== Wuxiang County ===
Towns:

- Fengzhou (丰州镇), Hongshui (洪水镇), Panlong (蟠龙镇), Linzhang (监漳镇), Gucheng (故城镇)

Townships:

- Modeng Township (墨镫乡), Hanbei Township (韩北乡), Dayou Township (大有乡), Jiahuo Township (贾豁乡), Guxian Township (故县乡), Shangsi Township (上司乡), Shibei Township (石北乡), Yongquan Township (涌泉乡), Fenshuiling Township (分水岭乡)

=== Xiangyuan County ===
Towns:

- Guhan (古韩镇), Wangqiao (王桥镇), Houbao (候堡镇), Xiadian (夏店镇), Titing (虒亭镇), Xiying (西营镇), Wangcun (王村镇), Xialiang (下良镇)

Townships:

- Shanfu Township (善福乡), Beidi Township (北底乡), Shangma Township (上马乡)

=== Zhangzi County ===
Towns:

- Danzhu (丹朱镇), Baodian (鲍店镇), Shizhe (石哲镇), Dabaotou (大堡头镇), Cilin (慈林镇), Setou (色头镇), Nanzhang (南漳镇)

Townships:

- Lanshui Township (岚水乡), Nianzhang Township (碾张乡), Changzhang Township (常张乡), Nanchen Township (南陈乡), Songcun Township (宋村乡)

== Datong ==
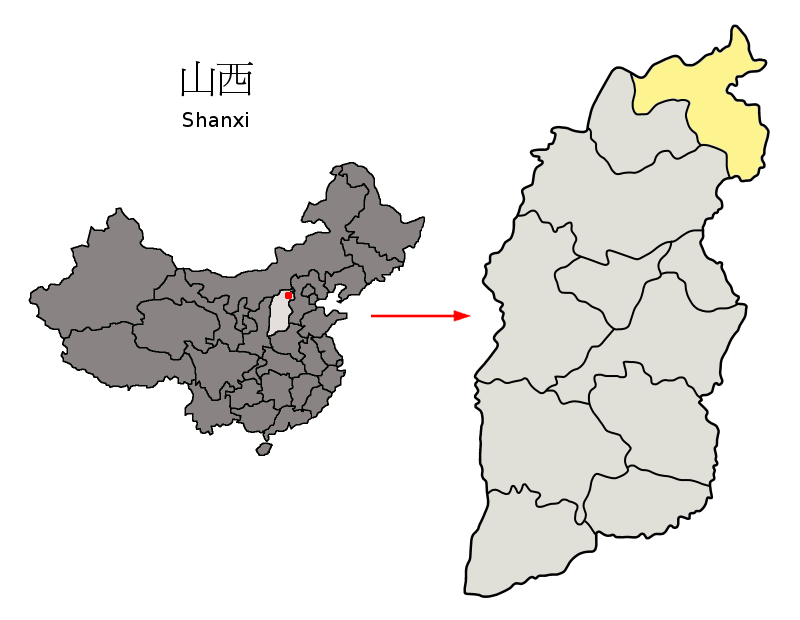
Location of Datong in the province

=== Chengqu, Datong ===
Subdistricts:

- Dongjie Subdistrict (东街街道), Nanjie Subdistrict (南街街道), Xijie Subdistrict (西街街道), Beijie Subdistrict (北街街道), Nanguan Subdistrict (南关街道), Beiguan Subdistrict (北关街道), South Xinjian Road Subdistrict (新建南路街道), North Xinjian Road Subdistrict (新建北路街道), Xinhua Avenue Subdistrict (新华街街道), Daqing Road Subdistrict (大庆路街道), Xihuayuan Subdistrict (西花园街道), Laopingwang Subdistrict (老平旺街道), Xiangyangli Subdistrict (向阳里街道), Zhenhua South Avenue Subdistrict (振华南街街道)

=== Kuangqu, Datong ===
Subdistricts:

- Xinsheng Subdistrict (新胜街道), Xinpingwang Subdistrict (新平旺街道), Meiyukou Subdistrict (煤峪口街道), Yongdingzhuang Subdistrict (永定庄街道), Tongjialiang Subdistrict (同家梁街道), Silaogou Subdistrict (四老沟街道), Xinzhouyao Subdistrict (忻州窑街道), Baidong Subdistrict (白洞街道), Yanya Subdistrict (雁崖街道), Wajinwan Subdistrict (挖金湾街道), Jinhuagong Subdistrict (晋华宫街道), Majiliang Subdistrict (马脊梁街道), Dadougou Subdistrict (大斗沟街道), Wangcun Subdistrict (王村街道), Jiangjiawan Subdistrict (姜家湾街道), Xinquan Road Subdistrict (新泉路街道), Minsheng Subdistrict (民胜街道), Kouquan Subdistrict (口泉街道), Makou Subdistrict (马口街道), Yanzishan Subdistrict (燕子山街道), Xing'ergou Subdistrict (杏儿沟街道), Qingciyao Subdistrict (青磁窑街道), Pingquan Road Subdistrict (平泉路街道), Sitaigou Subdistrict (四台沟街道)

=== Nanjiao District ===
Towns:

- Yungang (云冈镇), Gaoshan (高山镇), Gudian (古店镇)

Townships:

- Kouquan Township (口泉乡), Xinwang Township (新旺乡), Shuibosi Township (水泊寺乡), Majunying Township (马军营乡), Xihanling Township (西韩岭乡), Pingwang Township (平旺乡), Ya'erya Township (鸦儿崖乡)

=== Xinrong District ===
The only town is Xinrong (新荣镇)

Townships:

- Polubao Township (破鲁堡乡), Guojiayao Township (郭家窑乡), Huayuanwan Township (花园湾屯乡), Xicun Township (西村乡), Shangshenjian Township (上深涧乡), Baoziwan Township (堡子湾乡)

=== Datong County ===
Towns:

- Xiping (西坪镇), Zhoushizhuang (周士庄镇), Beijiazao (倍加皂镇)

Townships:

- Xubao Township (许堡乡), Guayuan Township (瓜园乡), Dangliuzhuang Township (党留庄乡), Duzhuang Township (杜庄乡), Julebao Township (聚乐堡乡), Fengyu Township (峰峪乡), Jijiazhuang Township (吉家庄乡)

=== Guangling County ===
In 2001, the Guangling County was divided into two towns and seven townships.

Towns:

- Huquan (壶泉镇), Nancun (南村镇)

Townships:

- Zuotuan Township (作疃乡): 20 villages, Jiadou Township (加斗乡), Jiaoshan Township (蕉山乡), Yixing Township (宜兴乡), Liangzhuang Township (梁庄乡), Wanghu Township (望狐乡), Douquan Township (斗泉乡)

=== Hunyuan County ===
Towns:

- Yong'an (永安镇), Shagetuo (沙圪坨镇), Wangzhuangbao (王庄堡镇), Xifangcheng (西坊城镇), Caicun (蔡村镇), Daciyao (大磁窑镇)

Townships:

- Qianfoling Township (千佛岭乡), Qingciyao Township (青磁窑乡), Dongfangcheng Township (东坊城乡), Wucheng Township (吴城乡), Guan'er Township (官儿乡), Nanyulin Township (南榆林乡), Huanghuatan Township (黄花滩乡), Peicun Township (裴村乡), Xiliucun Township (西留村乡), Xiahancun Township (下韩村乡), Tuofeng Township (驼峰乡), Darenzhuang Township (大仁庄乡)

=== Lingqiu County ===
Towns:

- Wuling (武灵镇), Donghenan (东河南镇), Shangzhai (上寨镇)

Townships:

- Luoshuihe Township (落水河乡), Zhaobei Township (赵北乡), Duyu Township (独峪乡), Xiaguan Township (下关乡), Baiyatai Township (白崖台乡), Shizhuang Township (史庄乡), Shijia Township (石家乡), Liuke Township (柳科乡), Hongshileng Township (红石塄乡)

=== Tianzhen County ===
Towns:

- Yuquan (玉泉镇), Guqianbao (谷前堡镇), Mixinwan (米薪湾镇), Lujiawan (逯家湾镇), Xinpingbao (新平堡镇)

Townships:

- Sanshilipu Township (三十里铺乡), Nanhebao Township (南河堡乡), Jiajiatun Township (贾家屯乡), Zhaojiagou Township (赵家沟乡), Nangaoya Township (南高崖乡), Zhangxihe Township (张西河乡)

=== Yanggao County ===
Towns:

- Longquan (龙泉镇), Luowenzao (罗文皂镇), Wangguantun (王官屯镇), Dabaideng (大白登镇), Gucheng (古城镇), Dongxiaocun (东小村镇), Youzai (友宰镇), Shizitun (狮子屯镇)

Townships:

- Xiashenjing Township (下深井乡), Changcheng Township (长城乡), Beixutun Township (北徐屯乡), Majiazao Township (马家皂乡), Aoshi Township (鳌石乡)

=== Zuoyun County ===
Towns:

- Yunxing (云兴镇), Dianwan (店湾镇), Que'ershan (鹊儿山镇)

Townships:

- Santun Township (三屯乡), Zhangjiachang Township (张家场乡), Xiaojingzhuang Township (小京庄乡), Guanjiabao Township (管家堡乡), Madaotou Township (马道头乡), Shuiyao Township (水窑乡)

== Jincheng ==
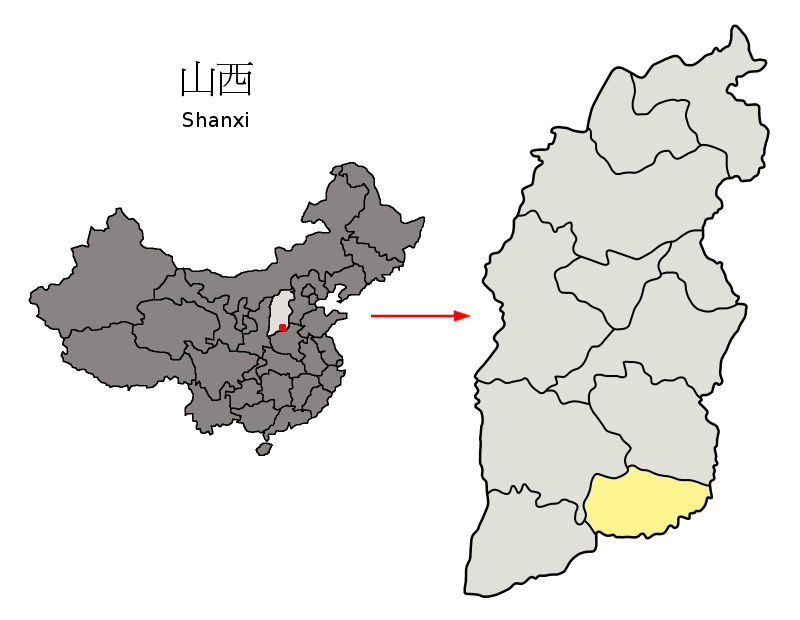
Location of Jincheng in the province

=== Chengqu, Jincheng ===
Subdistricts:

- Dongjie Subdistrict (东街街道), Xijie Subdistrict (西街街道), Nanjie Subdistrict (南街街道), Beijie Subdistrict (北街街道), Kuangqu Subdistrict (矿区街道), Zhongjiazhuang Subdistrict (钟家庄街道), Xishangzhuang Subdistrict (西上庄街道)

Towns:

- Beishidian (北石店镇)

=== Gaoping ===
Subdistricts:

- Beicheng Avenue Subdistrict (北城街街道), Dongcheng Avenue Subdistrict (东城街街道), Nancheng Avenue Subdistrict (南城街街道)

Towns:

- Mishan (米山镇), Sanjia (三甲镇), Chenqu (陈区镇), Beishi (北诗镇), Hexi (河西镇), Macun (马村镇), Yechuan (野川镇), Sizhuang (寺庄镇), Shennong (神农镇)

Townships:

- Jianning Township (建宁乡), Shiwei Township (石末乡), Yuancun Township (原村乡), Yonglu Township (永录乡)

=== Lingchuan County ===
Towns:

- Chongwen (崇文镇), Liyi (礼义镇), Fucheng (附城镇), Xihedi (西河底镇), Pingcheng (平城镇), Yangcun (杨村镇), Qinjiazhuang (秦家庄镇), Duohuoxiang (夺火乡镇), Lucheng (潞城镇)

Townships:

- Magedang Township (马圪当乡), Gujiao Township (古郊乡), Liuquan Township (六泉乡)

=== Qinshui County ===
Towns:

- Longgang (龙港镇), Zhongcun (中村镇), Zhengzhuang (郑庄镇), Duanshi (端氏镇), Jiafeng (嘉峰镇), Zhengcun (郑村镇), Shizhuang (柿庄镇)

Townships:

- Fancunhe Township (樊村河乡), Tuwo Township (土沃乡), Zhangcun Township (张村乡), Suzhuang Township (苏庄乡), Hudi Township (胡底乡), Guxian Township (固县乡), Shili Township (十里乡)

=== Yangcheng County ===
The only subdistrict is Dongcheng Subdistrict (东城街道)

Towns:

- Fengcheng (凤城镇), Beiliu (北留镇), Runcheng (润城镇), Dingdian (町店镇), Qinchi (芹池镇), Ciying (次营镇), Henghe (横河镇), Hebei (河北镇), Manghe (蟒河镇), Dongye (东冶镇)

Townships:

- Baisang Township (白桑乡), Sitou Township (寺头乡), Xihe Township (西河乡), Binli Township (演礼乡), Gujiang Township (固隆乡), Dongfeng Township (董封乡), Jialing Township (驾岭乡)

=== Zezhou County ===
Towns:

- Zhoucun (周村镇), Gaodu (高都镇), Nancun (南村镇), Lichuan (犁川镇), Jinmiaopu (晋庙铺镇), Dadonggou (大东沟镇), Bagong (巴公镇), Dayang (大阳镇), Xiacun (下村镇), Jincun (金村镇), Shanhe (山河镇), Daji (大箕镇), Beiyicheng (北义城镇), Liushukou (柳树口镇)

Townships:

- Chuandi Township (川底乡), Lizhai Township (李寨乡), Nanyu Township (南岭乡)

== Jinzhong ==
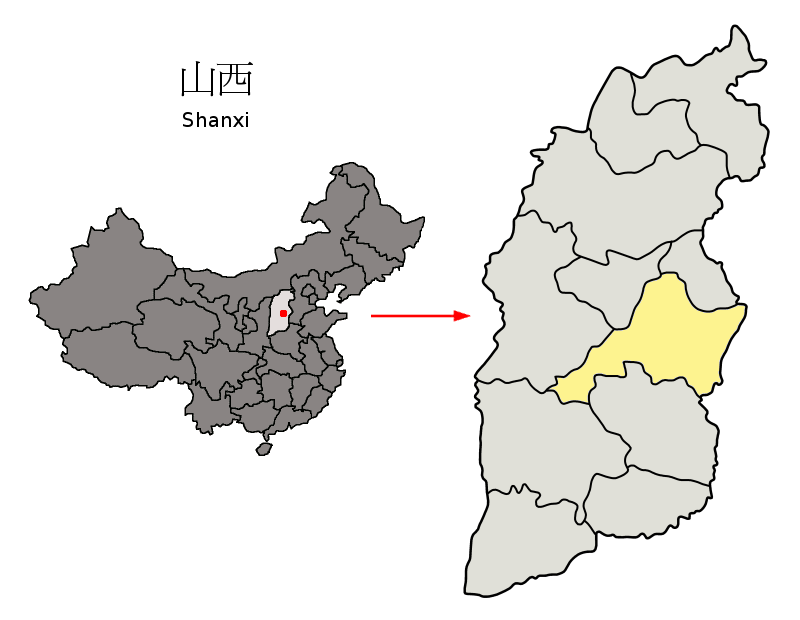
Location of Jinzhong in the province

=== Yuci District ===
Subdistricts:

- Beiguan Subdistrict (北关街道), Jinlun Subdistrict (锦纶街道), Xinhua Subdistrict (新华街道), Xinan Subdistrict (西南街道), Luxi Subdistrict (路西街道), Anning Subdistrict (安宁街道), Jingwei Subdistrict (经纬街道), Xinjian Subdistrict (新建街道), Jinhua Subdistrict (晋华街道)

Towns:

- Wujinshan (乌金山镇), Dongyang (东阳镇), Shitie (什贴镇), Changning (长凝镇), Beitian (北田镇), Xiuwen (修文镇)

Townships:

- Guojiabao Township (郭家堡乡), Zhangqing Township (张庆乡), Zhuangzi Township (庄子乡), Dongzhao Township (东赵乡)

=== Jiexiu ===
Subdistricts:

- Beiguan Subdistrict (北关街道), Xiguan Subdistrict (西关街道), Dongnan Subdistrict (东南街道), Xinan Subdistrict (西南街道), Beitan Subdistrict (北坛街道)

Towns:

- Yi'an (义安镇), Zhanglan (张兰镇), Lianfu (连福镇), Hongshan (洪山镇), Longfeng (龙凤镇), Mianshan (绵山镇), Yitang (义棠镇)

Townships:

- Chengguan Township (城关乡), Songgu Township (宋古乡), Sanjia Township (三佳乡)

=== Heshun County ===
Towns:

- Yixing (义兴镇), Liyang (李阳镇), Songyan (松烟镇), Qingcheng (青城镇), Hengling (横岭镇)

Townships:

- Weima Township (喂马乡), Pingsong Township (平松乡), Niuchuan Township (牛川乡), Mafang Township (马坊乡), Yangguangzhan Township (阳光占乡)

=== Lingshi County ===
Towns:

- Cuifeng (翠峰镇), Jingsheng (静升镇), Liangdu (两渡镇), Xiamen (夏门镇), Nanguan (南关镇), Duantun (段纯镇)

Townships:

- Mahe Township (马和乡), Yingwu Township (英武乡), Wangyu Township (王禹乡), Tanzhen Township (坛镇乡), Jiaokou Township (交口乡), Liangjiayan Township (粱家焉乡)

=== Pingyao County ===
Towns:

- Gutao (古陶镇), Duancun (段村镇), Dongquan (东泉镇), Hongshan (洪善镇), Ninggu (宁固镇)

Townships:

- Nanzheng Township (南政乡), Zhongdu Township (中都乡), Yuebi Township (岳壁乡), Boyi Township (卜宜乡), Mengshan Township (孟山乡), Zhuhang Township (朱坑乡), Xiangyuan Township (襄垣乡), Dujiazhuang Township (杜家庄乡), Xiangle Township (香乐乡)

=== Qi County ===
Towns:

- Zhaoyu (昭余镇), Dongguan (东观镇), Guxian (古县镇), Jialing (贾令镇), Chengzhao (城赵镇), Laiyuan (来远镇)

Townships:

- Xiliuzhi Township (六支乡), Yukou Township (峪口乡)

=== Shouyang County ===
Towns:

- Chaoyang (朝阳镇), Xiluo (西洛镇), Zong'ai (宗艾镇), Pingtou (平头镇), Songta (松塔镇), Nanyanzhu (南燕竹镇), Yinlingzhi (尹灵芝镇)

Townships:

- Pingshu Township (平舒乡), Jingchou Township (謦愁乡), Mashou Township (马首乡), Jingshang Township (景尚乡), Shanghu Township (上湖乡), Yangtouya Township (羊头崖乡), Wenjiazhuang Township (温家庄乡)

=== Taigu County ===
Towns:

- Mingxing (明星镇), Hucun (胡村镇), Fancun (范村镇)

Townships:

- Houcheng Township (侯城乡), Beiwang Township (北汪乡), Shuixiu Township (水秀乡), Yangyi Township (阳邑乡), Xiaobai Township (小白乡), Rencun Township (任村乡)

=== Xiyang County ===
Towns:

- Leping (乐平镇), Gaoluo (皋落镇), Dongyetou (东冶头镇), Zhanshang (沾尚镇), Dazhai (大寨镇)

Townships:

- Lijiazhuang Township (李家庄乡), Jiedu Township (界都乡), Sandu Township (三都乡), Zhaobi Township (赵壁乡), Sunshi Township (孔氏乡), Yanzhuang Township (闫庄乡), Xizhai Township (西寨乡)

=== Yushe County ===
Towns:

- Jicheng (箕城镇), Yunzhu (云竹镇), Haobei (郝北镇), Shecheng (社城镇)

Townships:

- Heyu Township (河峪乡), Beizhai Township (北寨乡), Xima Township (西马乡), Lanyu Township (兰峪乡), Jiangtang Township (讲堂乡)

=== Zuoquan County ===
Towns:

- Liaoyang (辽阳镇), Tongyu (桐峪镇), Matian (麻田镇), Qinquan (芹泉镇), Guai'er (拐儿镇)

Townships:

- Hanwang Township (寒王乡), Shili Township (石匣乡), Longquan Township (龙泉乡), Sucheng Township (粟城乡), Yangjiao Township (羊角乡)

== Linfen ==
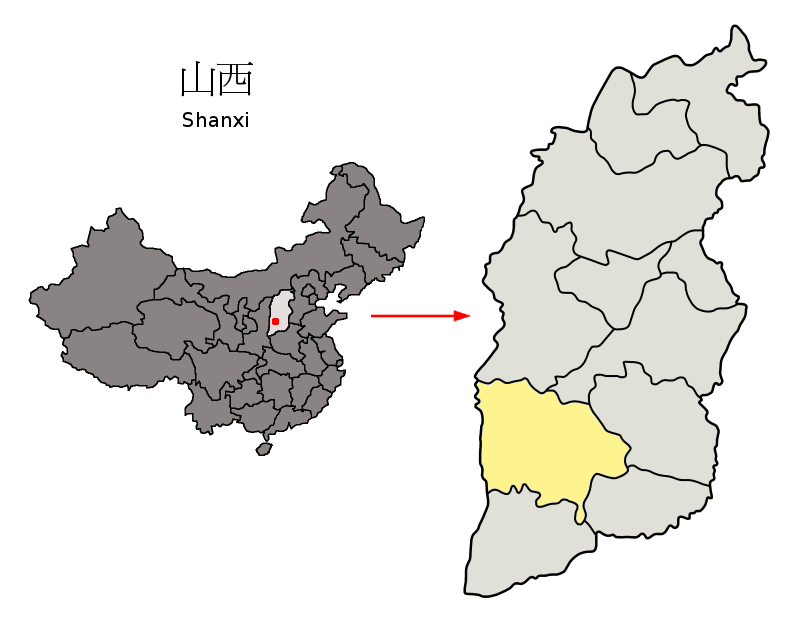
Location of Linfen in the province

=== Yaodu District ===
Subdistricts:

- Jiefang Road Subdistrict (解放路街道), Xinsi Avenue Subdistrict (辛寺街街道), Nanjie Subdistrict (南街街道), Shuita Avenue Subdistrict (水塔街街道), Xiangxian Avenue Subdistrict (乡贤街街道), Gulou West Avenue Subdistrict (鼓楼西街街道), Tieludong Subdistrict (铁路东街道), Chezhan Avenue Subdistrict (车站街街道), Fenhe Subdistrict (汾河街道)

Towns:

- Tunli (屯里镇), Qiaoji (乔李镇), Dayang (大阳镇), Xiandi (县底镇), Liucun (刘村镇), Jindian (金殿镇), Wucun (吴村镇), Tumen (土门镇), Weicun (魏村镇), Yaomiao (尧庙镇)

Townships:

- Duandian Township (段店乡), Jiade Township (贾得乡), Zhentou Township (枕头乡), Hedi Township (河底乡), Hejiazhuang Township (贺家庄乡), Yipingyuan Township (一平垣乡)

=== Houma ===
Subdistricts:

- Ludong Subdistrict (路东街道), Luxi Subdistrict (路西街道), Huibin Subdistrict (浍滨街道), Shangma Subdistrict (上马街道), Zhangcun Subdistrict (张村街道)

Townships:

- Xintian Township (新田乡), Gaocun Township (高村乡), Fengcheng Township (凤城乡)

=== Huozhou ===
Subdistricts:

- Nanhuan Road Subdistrict (南环路街道), Gulou Subdistrict (鼓楼街道), Beihuan Road Subdistrict (北环路街道), Kaiyuan Subdistrict (开元街道), Tuisha Subdistrict (退沙街道)

Towns:

- Xinzhi (辛置镇), Dazhang (大张镇), Bailong (白龙镇), Licao (李曹镇)

Townships:

- Sanjiao Township (三教乡), Shizhuang Township (师庄乡), Taotangyu Township (陶唐峪乡)

=== Anze County ===
Towns:

- Fucheng (府城镇), Hechuan (和川镇), Tangcheng (唐城镇), Jishi (冀氏镇)

Townships:

- Mabi Township (马必乡), Ducun Township (杜村乡), Liangma Township (良马乡)

=== Daning County ===
Towns:

- Xinshui (昕水镇), Qu'e (曲峨镇)

Townships:

- Sanduo Township (三多乡), Taide Township (太德乡), Xujiaduo Township (徐家垛乡), Taigu Township (太古乡)

=== Fenxi County ===
Towns:

- Yong'an (永安镇), Duizhu (对竹镇), Qingxiang (勍香镇), Heping (和平镇), Sengnian (僧念镇)

Townships:

- Dianping Township (佃坪乡), Tuanbai Township (团柏乡), Xingjiayao Township (邢家要乡)

=== Fushan County ===
Towns:

- Tiantan (天坛镇), Xiangshuihe (响水河镇), Zhangzhuang (张庄镇), Dongzhang (东张镇)

Townships:

- Huainian Township (槐埝乡), Beiwang Township (北王乡), Beihan Township (北韩乡), Mijiayuan Township (米家垣乡), Zhaigeta Township (寨圪塔乡)

=== Gu County ===
Towns:

- Yueyang (岳阳镇), Beiping (北平镇), Guyang (古阳镇), Jiuxian (旧县镇)

Townships:

- Shibi Township (石壁乡), Yongle Township (永乐乡), Nanyuan Township (南垣乡)

=== Hongdong County ===
Towns:

- Dahuaishu (大槐树镇), Ganting (甘亭镇), Quting (曲亭镇), Subao (苏堡镇), Wan'an (万安镇), Mingjiang (明姜镇), Zhaocheng (赵城镇), Guangshengsi (广胜寺镇), Liujiayuan (刘家垣镇)

Townships:

- Xingtangsi Township (兴唐寺乡), Yandi Township (淹底乡), Ticun Township (堤村乡), Xincun Township (辛村乡), Longma Township (龙马乡), Shantou Township (山头乡), Zuomu Township (左木乡)

=== Ji County ===
Towns:

- Jichang (吉昌镇), Tunli (屯里镇), Hukou (壶口镇)

Townships:

- Checheng Township (车城乡), Wencheng Township (文城乡), Dongcheng Township (东城乡), Baishansi Township (柏山寺乡), Zhongduo Township (中垛乡)

=== Pu County ===
Towns:

- Pucheng (蒲城镇), Xueguan (薛关镇), Heilongguan (黑龙关镇), Kecheng (克城镇)

Townships:

- Shanzhong Township (山中乡), Guxian Township (古县乡), Hongdao Township (红道乡), Qiaojiawan Township (乔家湾乡), Tailin Township (太林乡)

=== Quwo County ===
Towns:

- Lechang (乐昌镇), Shicun (史村镇), Qucun (曲村镇), Gaoxian (高显镇), Licun (里村镇)

Townships:

- Beidong Township (北董乡), Yangtan Township (杨谈乡)

=== Xi County ===
Towns:

- Longquan (龙泉镇), Wucheng (午城镇), Huangtu (黄土镇)

Townships:

- Chengnan Township (城南乡), Zhaizi Township (寨子乡), Doupo Township (陡坡乡), Xiali Township (下李乡), Yangtousheng Township (阳头升乡)

=== Xiangfen County ===
Towns:

- Xincheng (新城镇), Zhaokang (赵康镇), Fencheng (汾城镇), Nanjia (南贾镇), Gucheng (古城镇), Xiangling (襄陵镇), Dengzhuang (邓庄镇)

Townships:

- Taosi Township (陶寺乡), Yonggu Township (永固乡), Jingmao Township (景毛乡), Xijia Township (西贾乡), Dadeng Township (大邓乡), Nanxidian Township (南辛店乡)

=== Xiangning County ===
Towns:

- Changning (昌宁镇), Guanghua (光华镇), Taitou (台头镇), Guantou (管头镇), Xipo (西坡镇)

Townships:

- Shuangbi Township (双鹤乡), Guanwangmiao Township (关王庙乡), Weizhuang Township (尉庄乡), Xijiaokou Township (西交口乡), Zaoling Township (枣岭乡)

=== Yicheng County ===
Towns:

- Tangxing (唐兴镇), Nanliang (南梁镇), Lizhai (里寨镇), Longhua (隆化镇), Qiaoshang (桥上镇), Xirun (西闫镇)

Townships:

- Zhongwei Township (中卫乡), Nankang Township (南唐乡), Wangzhuang Township (王庄乡), Jiaodi Township (浇底乡)

=== Yonghe County ===
Towns:

- Zhihe (芝河镇), Sangbi (桑壁镇)

Townships:

- Gedi Township (阁底乡), Nanzhuang Township (南庄乡), Dashiyao Township (打石腰乡), Potou Township (坡头乡), Jiaokou Township (交口乡)

== Lüliang ==
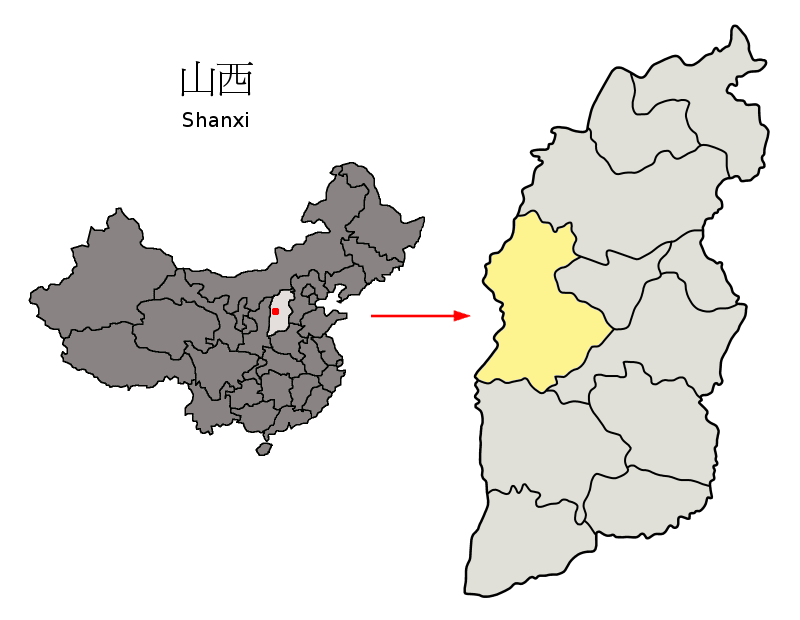
Location of Lüliang in the province

=== Lishi District ===
Subdistricts:

- Binhe Subdistrict (滨河街道), Fengshan Subdistrict (凤山街道), Chengbei Subdistrict (城北街道), Lianhuachi Subdistrict (莲花池街道), Tianjiahui Subdistrict (田家会街道), Xishuba Subdistrict (西属巴街道), Jiaokou Subdistrict (交口街道)

Towns:

- Wucheng (吴城镇), Xinyi (信义镇)

Townships:

- Pingtou Township (坪头乡), Zaolin Township (枣林乡), Hongyanchuan Township (红眼川乡)

=== Fenyang ===
Subdistricts:

- Wenfeng Subdistrict (文峰街道), Taiheqiao Subdistrict (太和桥街道)

Towns:

- Jiajiazhuang (贾家庄镇), Xinghuacun (杏花村镇), Jicun (冀村镇), Xiaojiazhuang (肖家庄镇), Binwu (演武镇), Sanquan (三泉镇), Shizhuang (石庄镇), Yangjiazhuang (杨家庄镇), Yudaohe (峪道河镇)

Townships:

- Lijiazhuang Township (栗家庄乡), Yangcheng Township (阳城乡), Xihe Township (西河乡)

=== Xiaoyi ===
Subdistricts:

- Xinyi Subdistrict (新义街道), Zhongyanglou Subdistrict (中阳楼街道), Zhenxing Subdistrict (振兴街道)

Towns:

- Duizhen (兑镇镇), Zhupu (柱濮镇), Xiabao (下堡镇), Wudong (梧桐镇), Gaoyang (高阳镇), Xixinzhuang (西辛庄镇), Yangquanqu (阳泉曲镇)

Townships:

- Xiaobao Township (孝堡乡), Xiashan Township (下栅乡), Yima Township (驿马乡), Nanyang Township (南阳乡), Ducun Township (杜村乡)

=== Fangshan County ===
Towns:

- Gedong (圪洞镇), Mafang (马坊镇), Yukou (峪口镇), Dawu (大武镇), Beiwudang (北武当镇)

Townships:

- Jicui Township (积翠乡), Madihui Township (麻地会乡)

=== Jiaocheng County ===
Towns:

- Tianning (天宁镇), Xishe (西社镇), Xiying (西营镇), Shuiyuguan (水峪贯镇), Xiajiaying (夏家营镇), Pangquangou (庞泉沟镇)

Townships:

- Hongxiang Township (洪相乡), Lingdi Township (岭底乡), Huili Township (会立乡), Dongpodi Township (东坡底乡)

=== Jiaokou County ===
Towns:

- Shuitou (水头镇), Tangcheng (康城镇), Shuangchi (双池镇), Taohongpo (桃红坡镇)

Townships:

- Shikou Township (石口乡), Huilong Township (回龙乡), Wenquan Township (温泉乡)

=== Lan County ===
Towns:

- Dongcun (东村镇), Lancheng (岚城镇), Jinming (普明镇), Jiehekou (界河口镇)

Townships:

- Tuyu Township (土峪乡), Shangming Township (上明乡), Wangshi Township (王狮乡), Liangjiazhuang Township (梁家庄乡), Shunhui Township (顺会乡), Hekou Township (河口乡), Sheke Township (社科乡), Dashetou Township (大蛇头乡)

=== Lin County ===
Towns:

- Linquan (临泉镇), Baiwen (白文镇), Chengzhuang (城庄镇), Mianban (兔板镇), Kehu (克虎镇), Liujiahui (刘家会镇), Tuanshuitou (湍水头镇), Linjiaping (林家坪镇), Zhaoxian (招贤镇), Qikou (碛口镇), Sanjiao (三交镇), Quyu (曲峪镇), Congluoyu (丛罗峪镇)

Townships:

- Anye Township (安业乡), Yuping Township (玉坪乡), Anjiazhuang Township (安家庄乡), Qingliangsi Township (青凉寺乡), Shibaisi Township (石白头乡), Leijiaqi Township (雷家碛乡), Dibabao Township (第八堡乡), Chegan Township (车赶乡), Dayu Township (大禹乡), Muguaping Township (木瓜坪乡)

=== Liulin County ===
Towns:

- Liulin (柳林镇), Mucun (穆村镇), Xuecun (薛村镇), Zhuangshang (庄上镇), Liuyu (留誉镇), Sanjiao (三交镇), Mengmen (孟门镇), Chengjiazhuang (成家庄镇)

Townships:

- Shixi Township (石西乡), Jiajiayuan Township (贾家垣乡), Chenjiawan Township (陈家湾乡), Jinjiazhuang Township (金家庄乡), Gaojiagou Township (高家沟乡), Lijiawan Township (李家湾乡), Wangjiagou Township (王家沟乡)

=== Shilou County ===
Towns:

- Lingquan (灵泉镇), Luocun (罗村镇), Yidie (义牒镇), Xiaosuan (小蒜镇)

Townships:

- Longjiao Township (龙交乡), Hehe Township (和合乡), Qianshan Township (前山乡), Peigou Township (裴沟乡), Caojiayuan Township (曹家垣乡)

=== Wenshui County ===
Towns:

- Fengcheng (凤城镇), Kaishan (开栅镇), Nanzhuang (南庄镇), Nan'an (南安镇), Liuhulan (刘胡兰镇), Xiaqu (下曲镇), Xiaoyi (孝义镇)

Townships:

- Nanwu Township (南武乡), Xicheng Township (西城乡), Beizhang Township (北张乡), Maxi Township (马西乡), Xicaotou Township (西槽头乡)

=== Xing County ===
Towns:

- Weifen (蔚汾镇), Kangning (康宁镇), Watang (瓦塘镇), Weijiatan (魏家滩镇), Gaojiacun (高家村镇), Luoyukou (罗峪口镇), Caijiahui (蔡家会镇)

Townships:

- Donghui Township (东会乡), Ehutan Township (恶虎滩乡), Jiaoloushen Township (交楼申乡), Mengjiaping Township (孟家坪乡), Aojiawan Township (奥家湾乡), Caijiaya Township (蔡家崖乡), Hejiahui Township (贺家会乡), Gexian Township (固贤乡), Gedashang Township (圪达上乡), Zhaojiaping Township (赵家坪乡)

=== Zhongyang County ===
Towns:

- Ningxing (宁兴镇), Jinluo (金罗镇), Zhike (枝柯镇), Wujiazhuang (武家庄镇), Nuanquan (暖泉镇)

Townships:

- Xiazaolin Township (下枣林乡), Chemingyu Township (车鸣峪乡)

== Shuozhou ==
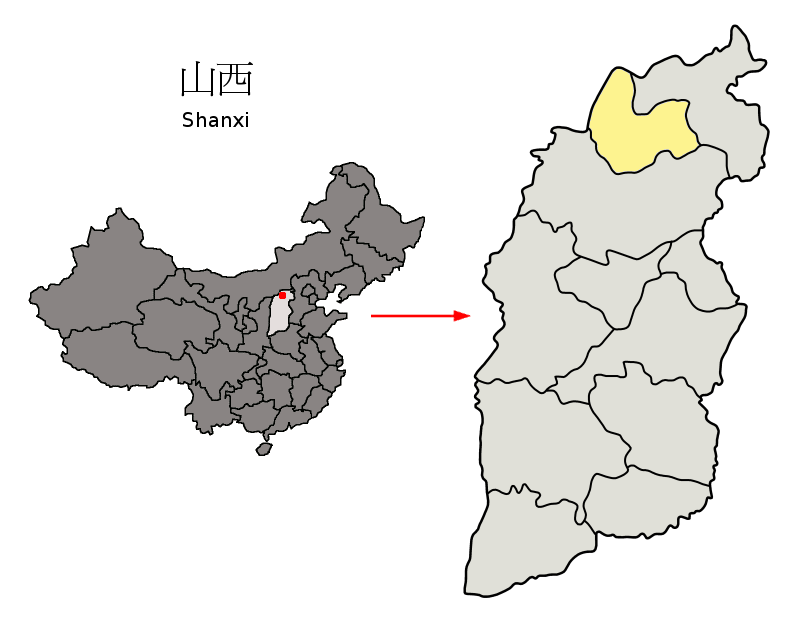
Location of Shuozhou in the province

=== Pinglu District ===
Towns:

- Jingping (井坪镇), Fenghuangcheng (凤凰城镇)

Townships:

- Baitang Township (白堂乡), Gaoshizhuang Township (高石庄乡), Xiashuitou Township (下水头乡), Shuangnian Township (双碾乡), Zuhu Township (阻虎乡), Taocun Township (陶村乡), Xishuijie Township (西水界乡), Xiamiangao Township (下面高乡), Yulin Township (榆林乡), Xiangyangbao Township (向阳堡乡), Xiamujiao Township (下木角乡)

=== Shuocheng District ===
Subdistricts:

- Beicheng Subdistrict (北城街道), Nancheng Subdistrict (南城街道), Shentou Subdistrict (神头街道), Beiwangzhuang Subdistrict (北旺庄街道)

Towns:

- Shentou Town (神头镇), Limin (利民镇)

Townships:

- Xiatuanbao Township (下团堡乡), Xiaopingyi Township (小平易乡), Zirun Township (滋润乡), Fushanzhuang Township (福善庄乡), Nanyulin Township (南榆林乡), Jiazhuang Township (贾庄乡), Shalenghe Township (沙塄河乡), Yaozitou Township (窑子头乡), Zhangcaizhuang Township (张蔡庄乡)

=== Huairen County ===
Towns:

- Yunzhong (云中镇), Wujiayao (吴家窑镇), Jinshatan (金沙滩镇), Maojiazao (毛家皂镇)

Townships:

- Hejiabao Township (何家堡乡), Xinjiayuan Township (新家园乡), Qinhe Township (亲和乡), Haibeitou Township (海北头乡), Maxinzhuang Township (马辛庄乡), Hetou Township (河头乡)

=== Shanyin County ===
Subdistricts:

- Dongcheng (东城管理委员会), Xicheng (西城管理委员会)

Towns:

- Daiyue (岱岳镇), Yujing (玉井镇), Beizhouzhuang (北周庄镇), Gucheng (古城镇)

Townships:

- Wumaying Township (吴马营乡), Xialaba Township (下喇叭乡), Maying Township (马营乡), Heshengbao Township (合盛堡乡), Anrong Township (安荣乡), Xuekulue Township (薛圐圙乡), Housuo Township (后所乡), Zhangjiazhuang Township (张家庄乡), Mayingzhuang Township (马营庄乡)

=== Ying County ===
Towns:

- Jincheng (金城镇), Nanhezhong (南河种镇), Xiashe (下社镇)

Townships:

- Zhenziliang Township (镇子梁乡), Yijing Township (义井乡), Zangzhai Township (臧寨乡), Dahuangwei Township (大黄巍乡), Xingzhai Township (杏寨乡), Xiamayu Township (下马峪乡), Nanquan Township (南泉乡), Dalinhe Township (大临河乡), Baimashi Township (白马石乡)

=== Youyu County ===
Towns:

- Xincheng (新城镇), Youwei (右卫镇), Weiyuan (威远镇), Yuanbaozi (元堡子镇)

Townships:

- Niuxinbao Township (牛心堡乡), Baitouli Township (白头里乡), Gaojiabao Township (高家堡乡), Dingjiayao Township (丁家窑乡), Yangqianhe Township (杨千河乡), Lidayao Township (李达窑乡)

== Xinzhou ==
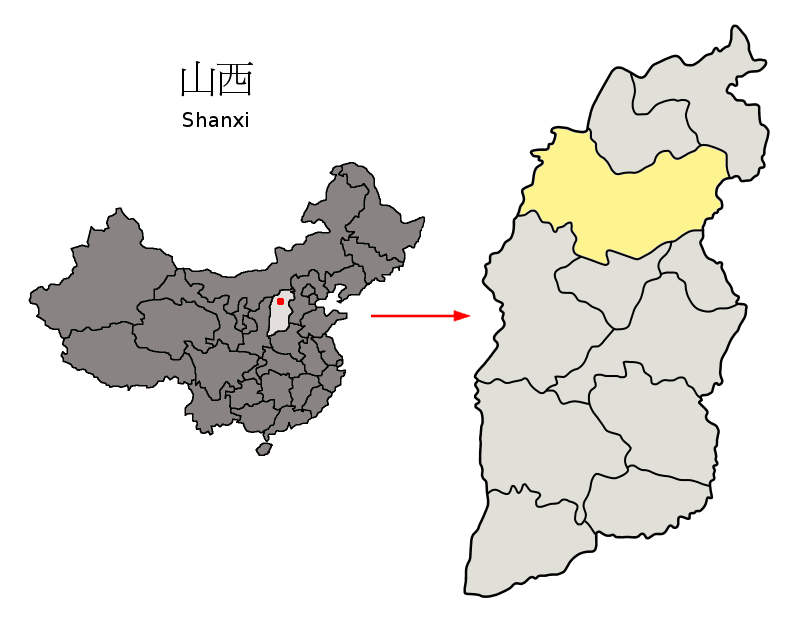
Location of Xinzhou in the province

=== Xinfu District ===
Subdistricts:

- Nancheng Subdistrict (南城街道), Changzheng Avenue Subdistrict (长征街街道), Xinjian Road Subdistrict (新建路街道)

Towns:

- Boming (播明镇), Qicun (奇村镇), Sanjiao (三交镇), Zhuangmo (庄磨镇), Douluo (豆罗镇), Dongcun (董村镇)

Townships:

- Caozhang Township (曹张乡), Gaocheng Township (高城乡), Qincheng Township (秦城乡), Jieyuan Township (解原乡), Hesuo Township (合索乡), Yangpo Township (阳坡乡), Lancun Township (兰村乡), Ziyan Township (紫岩乡), Xizhang Township (西张乡), Donglou Township (东楼乡), Beiyijing Township (北义井乡)

=== Yuanping ===
Subdistricts:

- Beicheng Subdistrict (北城街道), Nancheng Subdistrict (南城街道), Xuangang Subdistrict (轩岗街道)

Towns:

- Dongshe (东社镇), Guoyang (崞阳镇), Yanzhuang (闫庄镇), Daniudian (大牛店镇), Changlianggou (长梁沟镇), Sulongkou (苏龙口镇), Xuangang Town (轩岗镇)

Townships:

- Xinyuan Township (新原乡), Nanbai Township (南白乡), Zigan Township (子干乡), Zhongyang Township (中阳乡), Wangjiazhuang Township (王家庄乡), Loubanzhai Township (楼板寨乡), Duanjiabao Township (段家堡乡), Jiecun Township (解村乡), Yangou Township (沿沟乡), Dalin Township (大林乡), Xizhen Township (西镇乡)

=== Baode County ===
Towns:

- Dongguan (东关镇), Yimen (义门镇), Qiaotou (桥头镇), Yangjiawan (杨家湾镇)

Townships:

- Yaozhuang Township (腰庄乡), Hanjiachuan Township (韩家川乡), Linzheyu Township (林遮峪乡), Fengjiachuan Township (冯家川乡), Tuyata Township (土崖塔乡), Sunjiagou Township (孙家沟乡), Yaogetai Township (尧圪台乡), Yaowa Township (窑洼乡), Nanhegou Township (南河沟乡)

=== Dai County ===
Towns:

- Shangguan (上馆镇), Yangmingbao (阳明堡镇), Ekou (峨口镇), Nieying (聂营镇), Zaolin (枣林镇), Tanshang (滩上镇)

Townships:

- Xingao Township (新高乡), Yukou Township (峪口乡), Mofang Township (磨坊乡), Huyu Township (胡峪乡), Yanmenguan Township (雁门关乡)

=== Dingxiang County ===
Towns:

- Jinchang (晋昌镇), Hebian (河边镇), Hongdao (宏道镇)

Townships:

- Yangfang Township (杨芳乡), Nanwang Township (南王乡), Jiangcun Township (蒋村乡), Shenshan Township (神山乡), Lizhuang Township (季庄乡), Shoulu Township (受录乡)

=== Fanshi County ===
Towns:

- Fancheng (繁城镇), Shahe (砂河镇), Daying (大营镇)

Townships:

- Xingyuan Township (杏园乡), Hengjian Township (横涧乡), Dongshan Township (东山乡), Jiyizhuang Township (集义庄乡), Xiaruyue Township (下茹越乡), Jinshanpu Township (金山铺乡), Guangyubao Township (光裕堡乡), Baijiazhuang Township (柏家庄乡), Yantou Township (岩头乡), Shentangbao Township (神堂堡乡)

=== Hequ County ===
Towns:

- Wenmao (文笔镇), Xun (巡镇), Louziying (楼子营镇), Liujiata (刘家塔镇)

Townships:

- Jiuxian Township (旧县乡), Liugu Township (六固乡), Qianchuan Township (前川乡), Tugou Township (土沟乡), Danzhai Township (单寨乡), Shaping Township (沙坪乡), Sheliang Township (社梁乡), Shaquan Township (沙泉乡), Zhaojiagou Township (赵家沟乡)

=== Jingle County ===
Towns:

- Echeng (鹅城镇), Fengrun (丰润镇), Kangjiahui (康家会镇), Dujiacun (杜家村镇)

Townships:

- Shuanglu Township (双路乡), Zhongzhuang Township (中庄乡), Tang'ershang Township (堂尔上乡), Duanjiazhai Township (段家寨乡), Chiniwa Township (赤泥洼乡), Niangzishen Township (娘子神乡), Shenyugou Township (神峪沟乡), Wangcun Township (王村乡), Suopo Township (娑婆乡), Xincun Township (辛村乡)

=== Kelan County ===
Towns:

- Lanyi (岚漪镇), Sanjing (三井镇)

Townships:

- Wenquan Township (温泉乡), Yangping Township (阳坪乡), Dajian Township (大涧乡), Lijiagou Township (李家沟乡), Shuiyuguan Township (水峪贯乡), Xibaoyu Township (西豹峪乡), Shentangping Township (神堂坪乡), Gaojiahui Township (高家会乡), Wangjiacha Township (王家岔乡), Songjiagou Township (宋家沟乡)

=== Ningwu County ===
The only subdistrict is Chengqu Subdistrict (城区街道)

Towns:

- Fenghuang (凤凰镇), Dongzhai (东寨镇), Yangfangkou (阳方口镇), Shijiazhuang (石家庄镇)

Townships:

- Censhan Township (涔山乡), Yuzhuang Township (余庄乡), Xuejiazhuang Township (薛家洼乡), Huabeitun Township (化北屯乡), Ximafang Township (西马坊乡), Dongmafang Township (东马坊乡), Dietaisi Township (迭台寺乡), Geliao Township (圪廖乡), Huaidao Township (怀道乡), Xinbao Township (新堡乡)

=== Pianguan County ===
Towns:

- Xinguan (新关镇), Tianfengping (天峰坪镇), Laoying (老营镇), Wanjiazhai (万家寨镇)

Townships:

- Yaotou Township (窑头乡), Lougou Township (楼沟乡), Shangyu Township (尚峪乡), Nanbaozi Township (南堡子乡), Shuiquan Township (水泉乡), Chenjiaying Township (陈家营乡)

=== Shenchi County ===
Towns:

- Longquan (龙泉镇), Yijing (义井镇), Bajiao (八角镇)

Townships:

- Donghu Township (东湖乡), Taipingzhuang Township (太平庄乡), Hubei Township (虎北乡), Hezhi Township (贺职乡), Changzhen Township (长畛乡), Liebao Township (烈堡乡), Dapingbei Township (大严备乡)

=== Wutai County ===
Towns:

- Taicheng (台城镇), Taihuai (台怀镇), Gengzhen (耿镇镇), Doucun (豆村镇), Dongye (东冶镇), Baijiazhuang (白家庄镇)

Townships:

- Gounan Township (沟南乡), Donglei Township (东雷乡), Jiangfang Township (蒋坊乡), Jian'an Township (建安乡), Shenxi Township (神西乡), Menxianshi Township (门限石乡), Chenjiazhuang Township (陈家庄乡), Gaohongkou Township (高洪口乡), Linghuan Township (灵境乡), Yangbai Township (阳白乡), Rucun Township (茹村乡), Shiju Township (石咀乡), Jingangku Township (金岗库乡)

=== Wuzhai County ===
Towns:

- Yancheng (砚城镇), Sancha (三岔镇), Xiaohetou (小河头镇)

Townships:

- Qiansuo Township (前所乡), Huhui Township (胡会乡), Sunjiaping Township (孙家坪乡), Liangjiaping Township (梁家坪乡), Lijiaping Township (李家坪乡), Hanjialou Township (韩家楼乡), Dongxiuzhuang Township (东秀庄乡), Xinglingzi Township (杏岭子乡), Xinzhai Township (新寨乡)

== Yangquan ==
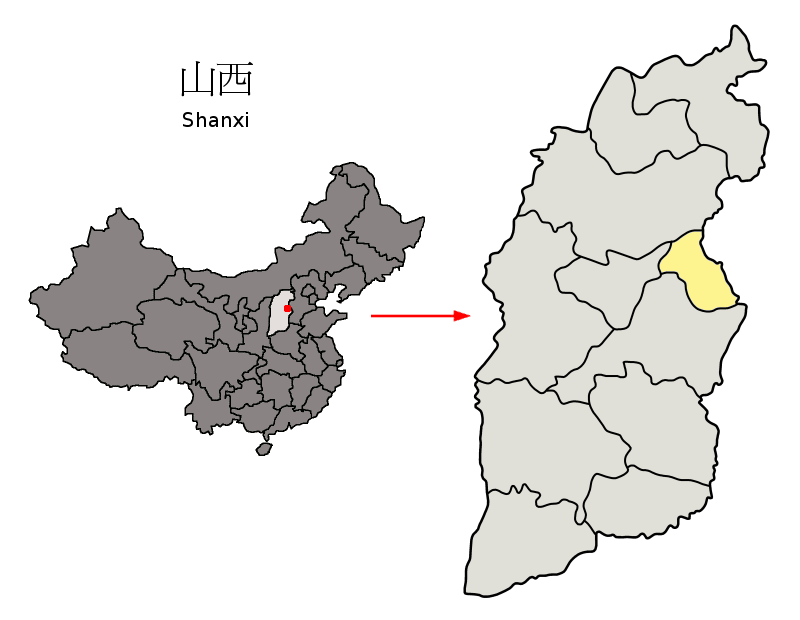
Location of Yangquan in the province

=== Chengqu, Yangquan ===
Subdistricts:

- Shangzhan Subdistrict (上站街道), Xiazhan Subdistrict (下站街道), Beida Avenue Subdistrict (北大街街道), Nanshan Road Subdistrict (南山路街道), Yijing Subdistrict (义井街道), Podi Subdistrict (坡底街道)

=== Jiaoqu, Yangquan ===
Towns:

- Yinying (荫营镇), Hedi (河底镇), Yijing (义井镇), Pingtan (平坦镇)

Townships:

- Xinanyu Township (西南舁乡), Yangjiazhuang Township (杨家庄乡), Lijiazhuang Township (李家庄乡), Jiujie Township (旧街乡)

=== Kuangqu, Yangquan ===
Subdistricts:

- Pingtan Avenue Subdistrict (平潭街街道), Shaping Subdistrict (沙坪街道), Caiwa Subdistrict (蔡洼街道), Saiyu Subdistrict (赛鱼街道), Qiaotou Subdistrict (桥头街道), Guishigou Subdistrict (贵石沟街道)

=== Pingding County ===
Towns:

- Guanshan (冠山镇), Yexi (冶西镇), Suohuang (锁簧镇), Zhangzhuang (张庄镇), Donghui (东回镇), Baijing (柏井镇), Niangziguan (娘子关镇), Jucheng (巨城镇)

Townships:

- Shimenkou Township (石门口乡), Chakou Township (岔口乡)

=== Yu County ===
Towns:

- Xiushui (秀水镇), Sunjiazhuang (孙家庄镇), Lujiacun (路家村镇), Nanlou (南娄镇), Niucun (牛村镇), Changchi (苌池镇), Shangshe (上社镇), Xiyan (西烟镇)

Townships:

- Xianren Township (仙人乡), Beixiazhuang Township (北下庄乡), Xiashe Township (下社乡), Liangjiazhai Township (梁家寨乡), Xipan Township (西潘乡), Dongliang Township (东粱乡)

== Yuncheng ==
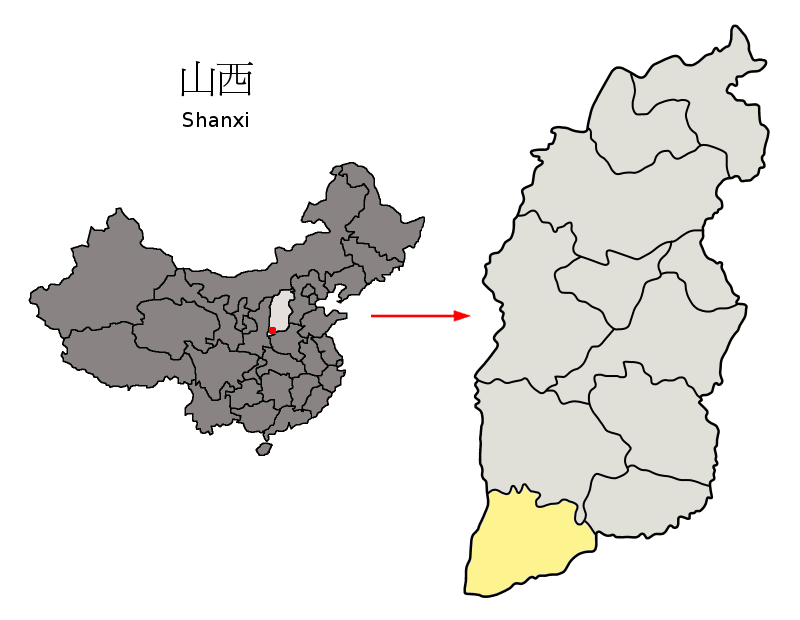
Location of Yuncheng in the province

=== Yanhu District ===
Subdistricts:

- Zhongcheng Subdistrict (中城街道), Dongcheng Subdistrict (东城街道), Xicheng Subdistrict (西城街道), Nancheng Subdistrict (南城街道), Beicheng Subdistrict (北城街道), Anyi Subdistrict (安邑街道), Daqu Subdistrict (大渠街道), Yaomeng Subdistrict (姚孟街道)

Towns:

- Jiezhou (解州镇), Longju (龙居镇), Beixiang (北相镇), Hongzhiyi (泓芝驿镇), Sanluli (三路里镇), Taocun (陶村镇), Dongguo (东郭镇)

Townships:

- Duzhang Township (席张乡), Jinjing Township (金井乡), Wangfan Township (王范乡), Fengcun Township (冯村乡), Shangguo Township (上郭乡), Shangwang Township (上王乡)

Other: Yudu Economic and Technological Zone (禹都经济技术开发区)

=== Hejin ===
Subdistricts:

- Chengqu Subdistrict (城区街道), Qingjian Subdistrict (清涧街道)

Towns:

- Fancun (樊村镇), Senglou (僧楼镇)

Townships:

- Xiaoliang Township (小梁乡), Chaijia Township (柴家乡), Zhaojiazhuang Township (赵家庄乡), Xiahua Township (下化乡), Yangcun Township (阳村乡)

=== Yongji ===
Subdistricts:

- Chengxi Subdistrict (城西街道), Chengbei Subdistrict (城北街道), Chengdong Subdistrict (城东街道)

Towns:

- Yuxiang (虞乡镇), Qingtou (卿头镇), Kaizhang (开张镇), Xiaolao (枵栳镇), Puzhou (蒲州镇), Hanyang (韩阳镇), Zhangying (张营镇)

=== Jiang County ===
Towns:

- Gujiang (古绛镇), Hengshui (横水镇), Chencun (陈村镇), Weizhuang (卫庄镇), Meli (么里镇), Nanfan (南凡镇), Anyu (安峪镇), Dajiao (大交镇)

Townships:

- Haozhuang Township (郝庄乡), Lengkou Township (冷口乡)

=== Jishan County ===
Towns:

- Jifeng (稷峰镇), Xishe (西社镇), Huayu (化峪镇), Zhaidian (翟店镇), Qinghe (清河镇)

Townships:

- Caicun Township (蔡村乡), Taiyang Township (太阳乡)

=== Linyi County ===
Towns:

- Yishi (猗氏镇), Meiyang (嵋阳镇), Linjin (临晋镇), Sunji (孙吉镇), Sanguan (三管镇), Danzi (耽子镇), Dongzhang (东张镇), Qiji (七级镇)

Townships:

- Chuhou Township (楚侯乡), Miaoshang Township (庙上乡), Jiaobei Township (角杯乡), Beixin Township (北辛乡), Beijing Township (北景乡)

=== Pinglu County ===
Towns:

- Shengrenjian (圣人涧镇), Changle (常乐镇), Zhangdian (张店镇), Zhangcun (张村镇), Caochuan (曹川镇), Sanmen (三门镇)

Townships:

- Hongchi Township (洪池乡), Duma Township (杜马乡), Buguan Township (部官乡), Podi Township (坡底乡)

=== Ruicheng County ===
Towns:

- Guwei (古魏镇), Fenglingdu (风陵渡镇), Yangcheng (阳城镇), Dawang (大王镇), Ximo (西陌镇), Monan (陌南镇), Yongle (永乐镇)

Townships:

- Xuezhang Township (学张乡), Nanwei Township (南卫乡), Donglu Township (东垆乡)

=== Wanrong County ===
Towns:

- Jiedian (解店镇), Tonghua (通化镇), Hanxue (汉薛镇), Ronghe (荣河镇)

Townships:

- Wanquan Township (万泉乡), Liwang Township (里望乡), Xicun Township (西村乡), Nanzhang Township (南张乡), Gaocun Township (高村乡), Huangfu Township (皇甫乡), Jiacun Township (贾村乡), Wangxian Township (王显乡), Guanghua Township (光华乡), Peizhuang Township (裴庄乡)

=== Wenxi County ===
Towns:

- Tongcheng (桐城镇), Guojiazhuang (郭家庄镇), Aodi (凹底镇), Xuedian (薛店镇), Dongzhen (东镇镇), Liyuan (礼元镇), Hedi (河底镇)

Townships:

- Shenbai Township (神柏乡), Yangyu Township (阳隅乡), Houcun Township (候村乡), Peishe Township (裴社乡), Hougong Township (后宫乡), Shimen Township (石门乡)

=== Xia County ===
Towns:

- Yaofeng (瑶峰镇), Miaoqian (庙前镇), Peijie (裴介镇), Shuitou (水头镇), Nianzhang (埝掌镇), Sijiao (泗交镇)

Townships:

- Weiguo Township (尉郭乡), Yuwang Township (禹王乡), Huzhang Township (胡张乡), Nandali Township (南大里乡), Qijiahe Township (祁家河乡)

=== Xinjiang County ===
Towns:

- Longxing (龙兴镇), Sanquan (三泉镇), Zezhang (泽掌镇), Beizhang (北张镇), Gujiao (古交镇), Wan'an (万安镇), Yangwang (阳王镇), Quanzhang (泉掌镇)

The only township is Hengqiao Township (横桥乡)

=== Yuanqu County ===
Towns:

- Xincheng (新城镇), Gucheng (古城镇), Lishan (历山镇), Wangmao (王茅镇), Maojia (毛家镇)

Townships:

- Puzhang Township (蒲掌乡), Yingyan Township (英言乡), Jieyu Township (解峪乡), Huafeng Township (华峰乡), Changzhi Township (长直乡), Gaoluo Township (皋落乡)
