= Xinghuacun =

Xinghuacun (Chinese: 杏花村; pinyin: Xìnghuācūn) may refer to:

- Xinghuacun Fenjiu, a Chinese baijiu distillery
- Xinghuacun, Shanxi, a town in Fenyang, Shanxi, China
- Xinghuacun Subdistrict, Chizhou, Anhui, China
- Xinghuacun Subdistrict, Hefei, Anhui, China

== See also ==
- Xinghua (disambiguation)
