= Sunji =

Sunji could refer to:

- Šunji, village in Konjic Municipality, Bosnia and Herzegovina
- Sunji, Lixin County (孙集镇), town in Lixin County, Anhui, China
- Sunji Township (孙集乡), in Shanghe County, Shandong, China
- Sunji, Linyi County, Shanxi (孙吉镇), town in Linyi County, Shanxi, China
