= Pingshu (disambiguation) =

Pingshu (评书) is a popular form of Chinese storytelling.

Pingshu (平舒) may refer to these places in China:

- Pingshu, Hebei, a town in Dacheng County, Hebei
- Pingshu Township, a township in Shouyang County, Shanxi
