= Xike =

Xike may refer to:

- Xike railway station, a railway station on the Taiwan Railways Administration West Coast line
- Xike Town (西柯镇), Tong'an, Xiamen, Fujian Province, China
- Xike Village (西岢村), Pingshu Township, Shouyang, Shanxi Province, China
