= Hubei (disambiguation) =

Hubei may refer to:

- Hubei (湖北), a province of China
- Hubei, Fujian (虎贝), a town in Ningde, Fujian, China
- Hubei Township (虎北乡), a township in Shenchi County, Shanxi, China
