= Jidian =

Jidian may refer to:

- Jidian, Shanxi, in Huguan County
- Jidian Township, Hubei, in Xiaochang County
- Jí Diàn (疾电), a character in AI Football GGO

== See also ==
- JiDion (born 2000), American YouTuber
