= Anxin Town =

Anxin 安新镇
- Town
- Anxin Zhen
- Location in Hebei Location in China
- Coordinates: 38°56′11.3″N 115°55′40.3″E
- Country: People's Republic of China
- Province: Hebei
- Prefecture-level city: Baoding
- County: Anxin County

Area
  - Total: 68.98 km^{2} (26.63 sq mi)

Population (2010)
  - Total: 68,962
  - Density: 999.7/km^{2} (2,589/sq mi)
- Time zone: UTC+8 (China Standard)
- Area code: 312

Anxin (Chinese: 安新镇; pinyin: Ānxīn Zhèn) is a town in Anxin County, under the jurisdiction of Baoding, Hebei Province, China. As of the 2010 census, it had a population of 68,962. Of the population, 34,422 were male and 34,540 were female. The age distribution included 11,886 individuals under 14 years old, 52,151 aged between 15 and 64, and 4,925 aged 65 and over.

== See also ==
- List of township-level divisions of Hebei
