= Zhaobeikou =

Zhaobeikou 赵北口镇
- Town
- Zhaobeikou Zhen
- Location in Hebei Location in China
- Coordinates: 38°55′28.0″N 116°05′36.9″E
- Country: People's Republic of China
- Province: Hebei
- Prefecture-level city: Baoding
- County: Anxin County

Area
  - Total: 22.68 km^{2} (8.76 sq mi)

Population (2010)
  - Total: 17,152
  - Density: 756.2/km^{2} (1,959/sq mi)
- Time zone: UTC+8 (China Standard)
- Area code: 312

Zhaobeikou (Chinese: 赵北口镇; pinyin: Zhàoběikǒu Zhèn) is a town in Anxin County, under the jurisdiction of Baoding, Hebei Province, China. As of the 2010 census, it had a population of 17,152. The population was composed of 8,555 males and 8,597 females. There were 3,370 residents under the age of 14, 12,289 aged between 15 and 64, and 1,493 aged 65 and over.

== See also ==
- List of township-level divisions of Hebei
