= Qin County =

Coordinates: 36°45′23″N 112°41′50″E

Qin County 沁县
- County
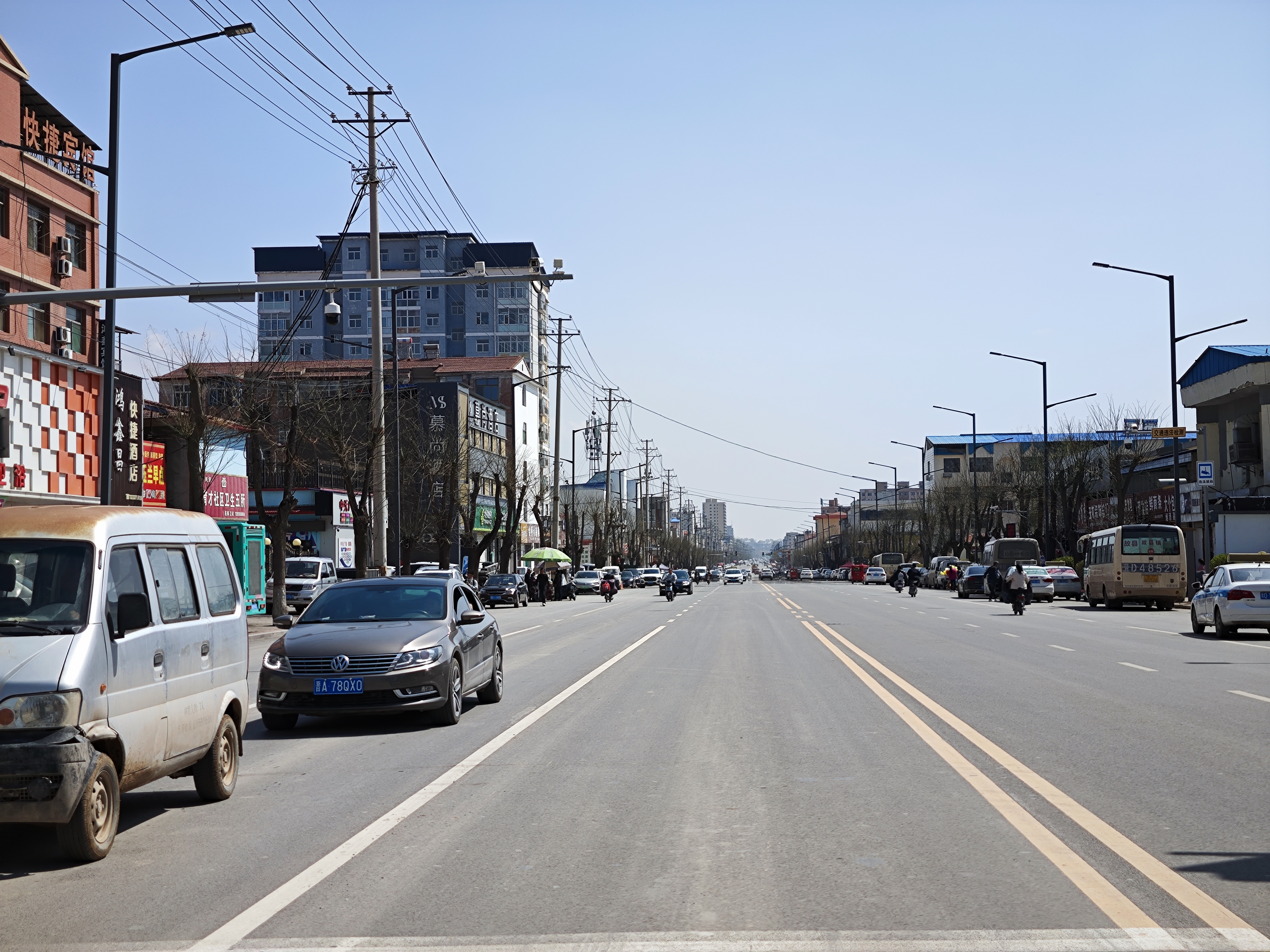

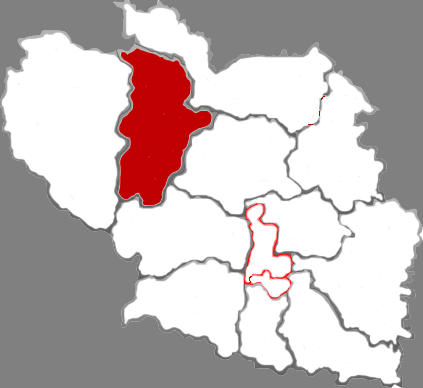
- Qin County in Changzhi

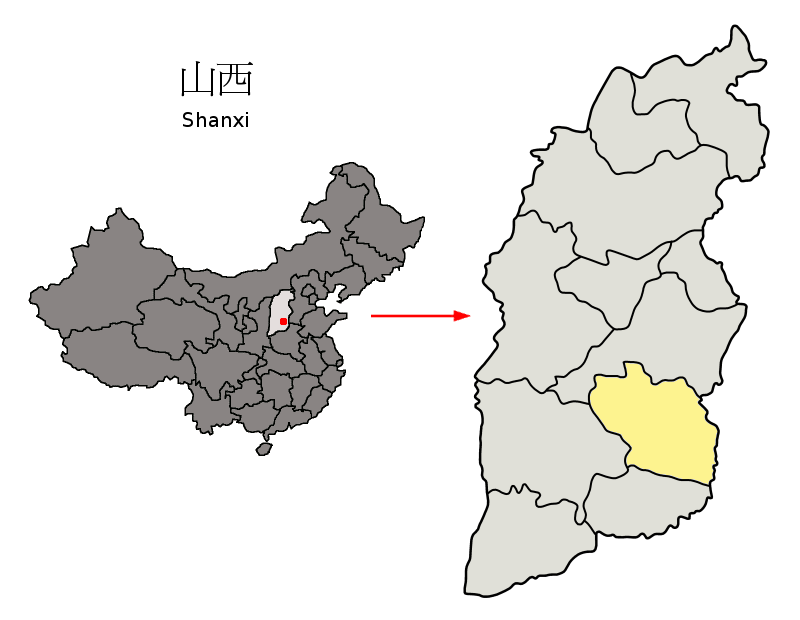
- Changzhi in Shanxi
- Country: People's Republic of China
- Province: Shanxi
- Prefecture-level city: Changzhi

Area
  - Total: 1,321 km^{2} (510 sq mi)

Population (2020)
  - Total: 138,578
  - Density: 104.9/km^{2} (271.7/sq mi)
- Time zone: UTC+8 (China Standard)

Qin County or Qinxian (simplified Chinese: 沁县; traditional Chinese: 沁縣; pinyin: Qìn Xiàn) is a county in the southeast-central part of Shanxi province, China. It is under the administration of Changzhi city.

It comprises the towns of Dingchang, Guocun, Guxian, Xindian, Zhangyuan, and Cecun and the townships of Duanliu, Songcun, Cicun, Niusi, Nanli, Nanquan, and Yang'an.

== Climate ==
Climate data for Qinxian, elevation 1,031 m (3,383 ft), (1991–2020 normals, extremes 1981–2010)
Month	Jan	Feb	Mar	Apr	May	Jun	Jul	Aug	Sep	Oct	Nov	Dec	Year
Record high °C (°F)	15.5 (59.9)	21.7 (71.1)	29.2 (84.6)	35.4 (95.7)	37.0 (98.6)	37.8 (100.0)	37.1 (98.8)	34.7 (94.5)	33.9 (93.0)	28.5 (83.3)	25.6 (78.1)	17.1 (62.8)	37.8 (100.0)
Mean daily maximum °C (°F)	2.9 (37.2)	6.6 (43.9)	12.9 (55.2)	20.0 (68.0)	25.1 (77.2)	28.4 (83.1)	29.0 (84.2)	27.4 (81.3)	23.1 (73.6)	17.7 (63.9)	10.5 (50.9)	4.1 (39.4)	17.3 (63.2)
Daily mean °C (°F)	−5.9 (21.4)	−1.8 (28.8)	4.7 (40.5)	12.0 (53.6)	17.6 (63.7)	21.3 (70.3)	22.9 (73.2)	21.3 (70.3)	16.2 (61.2)	9.8 (49.6)	2.4 (36.3)	−4.2 (24.4)	9.7 (49.4)
Mean daily minimum °C (°F)	−12.1 (10.2)	−7.9 (17.8)	−2.0 (28.4)	4.6 (40.3)	10.0 (50.0)	14.5 (58.1)	17.9 (64.2)	16.7 (62.1)	11.0 (51.8)	3.9 (39.0)	−3.2 (26.2)	−9.8 (14.4)	3.6 (38.5)
Record low °C (°F)	−25.6 (−14.1)	−26.1 (−15.0)	−16.1 (3.0)	−7.2 (19.0)	−1.7 (28.9)	5.1 (41.2)	10.4 (50.7)	8.2 (46.8)	−0.6 (30.9)	−8.1 (17.4)	−19.5 (−3.1)	−26.0 (−14.8)	−26.1 (−15.0)
Average precipitation mm (inches)	4.6 (0.18)	7.3 (0.29)	11.9 (0.47)	29.6 (1.17)	37.2 (1.46)	68.0 (2.68)	150.0 (5.91)	120.8 (4.76)	62.3 (2.45)	33.4 (1.31)	16.8 (0.66)	2.8 (0.11)	544.7 (21.45)
Average precipitation days (≥ 0.1 mm)	2.8	3.6	3.9	5.7	7.2	10.2	13.7	11.7	9.1	6.7	4.6	2.7	81.9
Average snowy days	3.7	4.6	2.6	0.7	0	0	0	0	0	0.1	2.5	3.4	17.6
Average relative humidity (%)	57	55	50	49	52	61	75	78	76	69	64	59	62
Mean monthly sunshine hours	169.3	165.2	196.1	226.6	247.9	216.8	198.7	187.9	170.3	180.6	170.1	170.6	2,300.1
Percentage possible sunshine	55	54	53	57	56	49	45	45	46	53	56	57	52
Source: China Meteorological Administration
