= Santai, Hebei =

Santai 三台镇
- Town
- Santai Zhen
- Location in Hebei Location in China
- Coordinates: 38°58′28.6″N 115°50′41.4″E
- Country: People's Republic of China
- Province: Hebei
- Prefecture-level city: Baoding
- County: Anxin County

Area
  - Total: 55.40 km^{2} (21.39 sq mi)

Population (2010)
  - Total: 60,665
  - Density: 1,095/km^{2} (2,840/sq mi)
- Time zone: UTC+8 (China Standard)
- Area code: 312

Santai (Chinese: 三台镇; pinyin: Sāntái Zhèn) is a town in Anxin County, under the jurisdiction of Baoding, Hebei Province, China. As of the 2010 census, it had a population of 60,665. Of the population, 33,713 were male and 26,952 were female. The age distribution included 5,522 individuals under 14 years old, 52,479 aged between 15 and 64, and 2,664 aged 65 and over.

== See also ==
- List of township-level divisions of Hebei
