= Luzhuang Township =

Luzhuang Township 芦庄乡
- Township
- Luzhuang Xiang
- Location in Hebei Location in China
- Coordinates: 38°43′57.2″N 115°41′28.5″E
- Country: People's Republic of China
- Province: Hebei
- Prefecture-level city: Baoding
- County: Anxin County

Area
  - Total: 43.66 km^{2} (16.86 sq mi)

Population (2010)
  - Total: 19,925
  - Density: 456.4/km^{2} (1,182/sq mi)
- Time zone: UTC+8 (China Standard)
- Area code: 312

Luzhuang Township (Chinese: 芦庄乡; pinyin: Lúzhuāng Xiāng) is a rural township located in Anxin County, under the administration of Baoding, Hebei Province, China. According to the 2010 Chinese Census, the township had a population of 19,925, including 10,179 males and 9,746 females. The population included 3,822 individuals aged 0–14, 14,630 aged 15–64, and 1,473 aged 65 and above.

== See also ==
- List of township-level divisions of Hebei
