= Anxin County =

Anxin County 安新县
- County
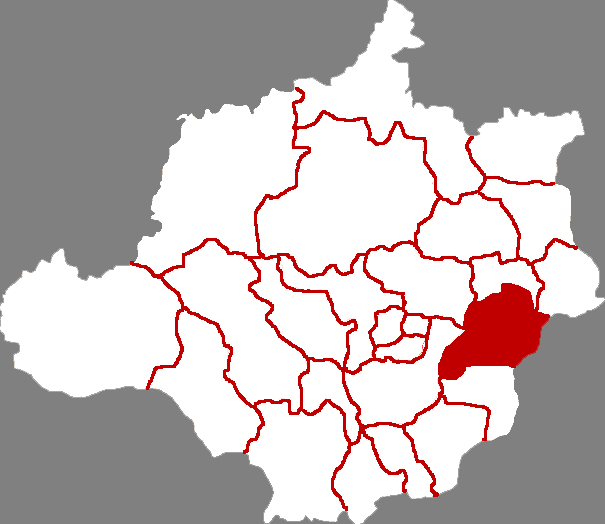
- Anxin in Baoding

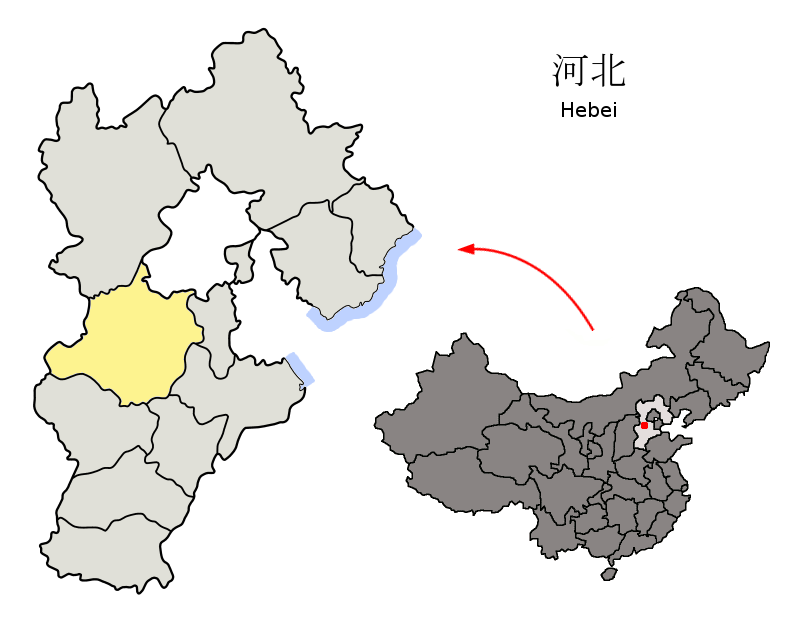
- Baoding in Hebei
- Coordinates: 38°56′07″N 115°56′10″E
- Country: People's Republic of China
- Province: Hebei
- Prefecture-level city: Baoding
- Township-level divisions: 9 towns 3 townships
- County seat: Anxin Town (安新镇)

Area
  - Total: 726 km^{2} (280 sq mi)

Population (2020 census)
  - Total: 453,723
  - Density: 625/km^{2} (1,620/sq mi)
- Time zone: UTC+8 (China Standard)
- Postal code: 071600

Anxin (Chinese: 安新; pinyin: Ānxīn) is a county in central Hebei province, China. It is under the jurisdiction of Baoding City, the centre of which lies about 40 km (25 mi) to the west, and as of 2020, it has a population of 453,723 residing in an area of 726 km^{2} (280 sq mi). Most of Baiyang Lake is located in the county.

Anxin forms part of the Xiong'an New Area designated by the government in 2017.

== Administrative divisions ==
There are nine towns and three townships under the county's administration.

Towns:

- Anxin Town (安新镇), Dawang (大王镇), Santai (三台镇), Duancun (端村镇), Zhaobeikou (赵北口镇), Tongkou (同口镇), Liulizhuang (刘李庄镇), Anzhou (安州镇), Laohetou (老河头镇)

Townships:

- Quantou Township (圈头乡), Zhaili Township (寨里乡), Luzhuang Township (芦庄乡)

== Climate ==
Climate data for Anxin, elevation 4 m (13 ft), (1991–2020 normals, extremes 1981–2010)
Month	Jan	Feb	Mar	Apr	May	Jun	Jul	Aug	Sep	Oct	Nov	Dec	Year
Record high °C (°F)	16.8 (62.2)	20.4 (68.7)	30.2 (86.4)	31.8 (89.2)	37.2 (99.0)	40.1 (104.2)	41.0 (105.8)	36.0 (96.8)	34.3 (93.7)	31.3 (88.3)	23.2 (73.8)	15.3 (59.5)	41.0 (105.8)
Mean daily maximum °C (°F)	2.1 (35.8)	6.4 (43.5)	14.0 (57.2)	21.2 (70.2)	27.1 (80.8)	31.5 (88.7)	32.2 (90.0)	30.4 (86.7)	26.7 (80.1)	19.9 (67.8)	10.6 (51.1)	3.8 (38.8)	18.8 (65.9)
Daily mean °C (°F)	−4.6 (23.7)	−0.5 (31.1)	7.2 (45.0)	14.5 (58.1)	20.5 (68.9)	25.2 (77.4)	27.0 (80.6)	25.2 (77.4)	20.2 (68.4)	13.1 (55.6)	4.3 (39.7)	−2.4 (27.7)	12.5 (54.5)
Mean daily minimum °C (°F)	−10.0 (14.0)	−6.1 (21.0)	0.8 (33.4)	7.9 (46.2)	13.9 (57.0)	19.1 (66.4)	22.5 (72.5)	21.0 (69.8)	14.9 (58.8)	7.6 (45.7)	−0.6 (30.9)	−7.2 (19.0)	7.0 (44.6)
Record low °C (°F)	−25.1 (−13.2)	−19.9 (−3.8)	−11.2 (11.8)	−3.0 (26.6)	5.6 (42.1)	8.9 (48.0)	15.7 (60.3)	12.4 (54.3)	5.0 (41.0)	−3.8 (25.2)	−9.3 (15.3)	−24.2 (−11.6)	−25.1 (−13.2)
Average precipitation mm (inches)	2.1 (0.08)	5.0 (0.20)	8.1 (0.32)	23.1 (0.91)	30.1 (1.19)	60.2 (2.37)	150.5 (5.93)	113.2 (4.46)	51.9 (2.04)	25.4 (1.00)	12.4 (0.49)	2.4 (0.09)	484.4 (19.08)
Average precipitation days (≥ 0.1 mm)	1.7	1.9	2.6	4.4	6.1	8.4	12.0	10.0	6.9	5.0	3.1	1.6	63.7
Average snowy days	2.7	2.3	0.9	0.1	0	0	0	0	0	0	1.5	2.4	9.9
Average relative humidity (%)	62	56	52	56	60	64	76	81	76	70	69	65	66
Mean monthly sunshine hours	148.5	163.3	208.8	233.7	254.2	219.3	193.3	198.0	198.0	180.7	146.8	144.1	2,288.7
Percentage possible sunshine	49	53	56	59	57	49	43	47	54	53	49	49	52
Source: China Meteorological Administration
