= Zhaili Township =

Zhaili Township 寨里乡
- Township
- Zhaili Xiang
- Location in Hebei Location in China
- Coordinates: 38°56′02.9″N 115°46′36.1″E
- Country: People's Republic of China
- Province: Hebei
- Prefecture-level city: Baoding
- County: Anxin County

Area
  - Total: 54.78 km^{2} (21.15 sq mi)

Population (2010)
  - Total: 31,748
  - Density: 579.6/km^{2} (1,501/sq mi)
- Time zone: UTC+8 (China Standard)
- Area code: 312

Zhaili Township (Chinese: 寨里乡; pinyin: Zhàilǐ Xiāng) is a rural township located in Anxin County, under the administration of Baoding, Hebei Province, China. According to the 2010 Chinese Census, the township had a population of 31,748 residents, including 16,279 males and 15,469 females. The age structure was 6,029 aged 0–14, 23,047 aged 15–64, and 2,672 aged 65 and above.

== See also ==
- List of township-level divisions of Hebei
