= Yonghe County =

Coordinates: 36°45′39″N 110°37′54″E

Yonghe County 永和县 Yunghwo; Yungho
- County
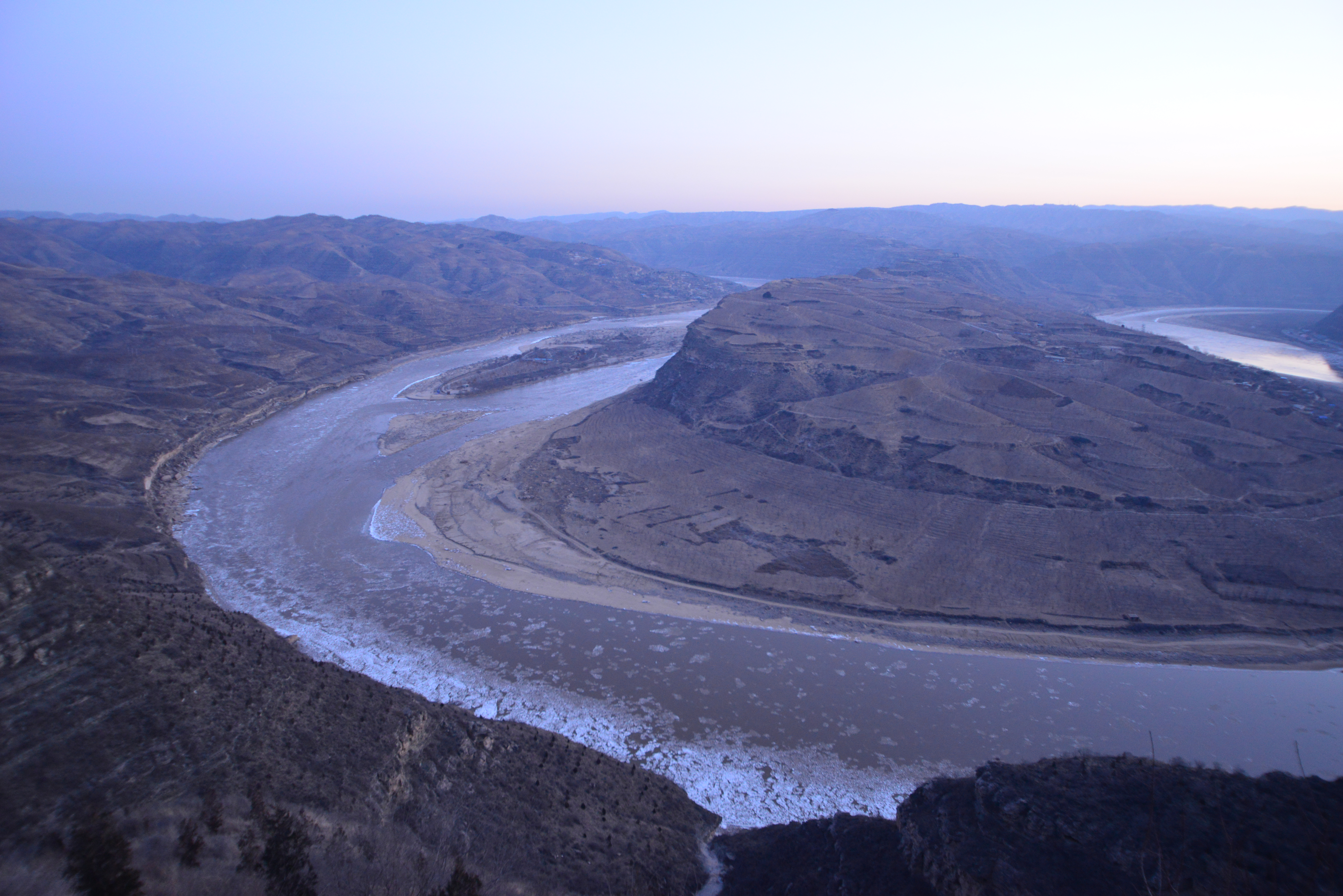
- Qiankun Bend of Yellow River in Yonghe

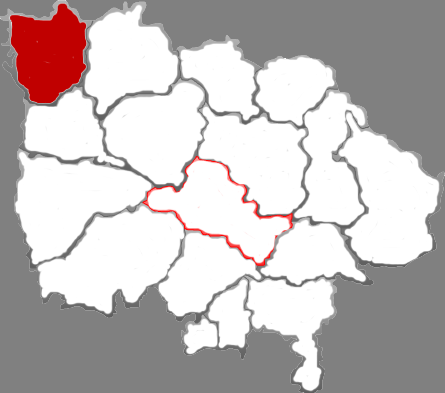
- Yonghe in Linfen

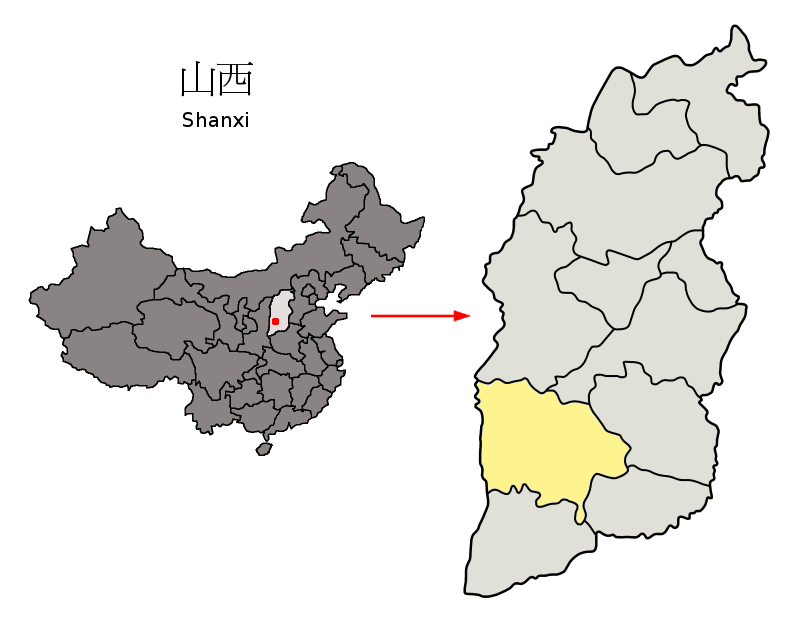
- Linfen in Shanxi
- Country: People's Republic of China
- Province: Shanxi
- Prefecture-level city: Linfen
- Seat: Zhihe

Area
  - Total: 1,214 km^{2} (469 sq mi)

Population (2010)
  - Total: 63,649
  - Density: 52.43/km^{2} (135.8/sq mi)
- Time zone: UTC+8 (China Standard)

Yonghe County (Chinese: 永和县; pinyin: Yǒnghé Xiàn) is a county in the southwest of Shanxi province, China, bordering Shaanxi province to the west across the Yellow River. It is under the administration of the prefecture-level city of Linfen, and located in its northwest corner. The county spans an area of 1,214 square kilometres (469 mi^{2}), and, as of the 2010 Chinese Census, the county had a population of 63,649. The county government's seat is located in the town of Zhihe.

== History ==
In 619 CE, the area was organized as Donghezhou (Chinese: 东和州). In 628 CE, Donghezhou was abolished, and the area was placed under the jurisdiction of Xizhou.

=== People's Republic of China ===
Upon the establishment of the People's Republic of China in 1949, the county was placed under the jurisdiction of the prefecture of Linfen. In 1954, the county was placed under the administration of Jinnan Prefecture. In 1958, Yonghe County was briefly abolished. Upon the country's re-establishment in 1961, it was returned to Jinnan Prefecture. In 1970, the county was placed under the jurisdiction of the prefecture of Linfen, which became a prefecture-level city in 2000.

== Geography ==
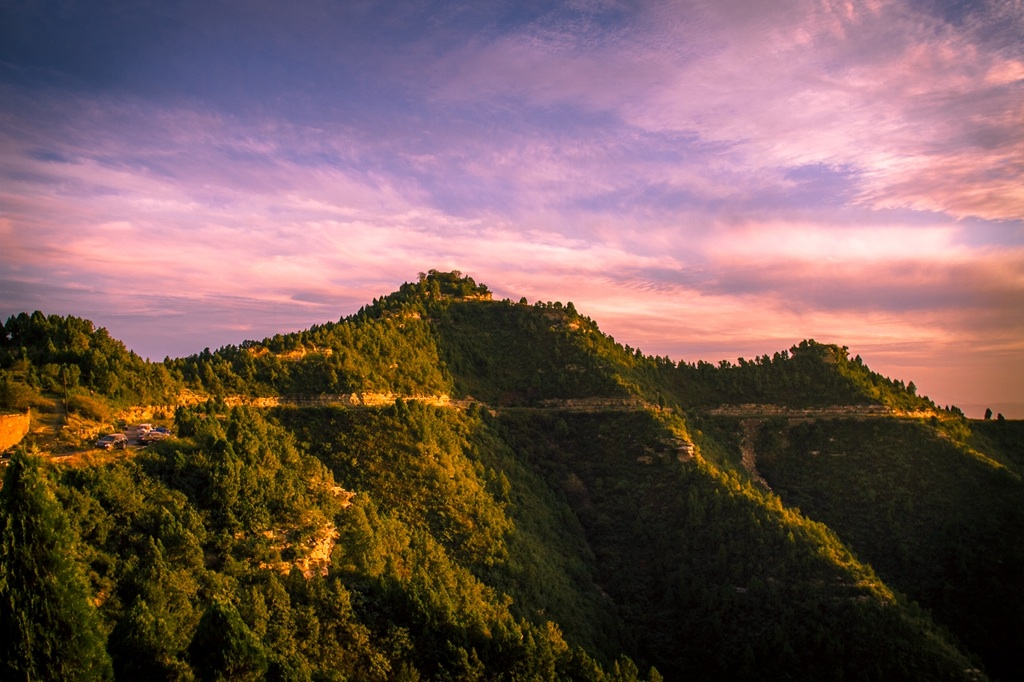
A sunset in Yonghe County

Yonghe County's highest point reaches 1,524 metres (5,000 ft) above sea level, and its lowest point, along the Yellow River, is 511.9 metres (1,679 ft) above sea level. The Yellow River flows through the county from north to south, as well as numerous tributaries, such as the Zhi River (Chinese: 芝河; pinyin: Zhī Hé) and the Sangbi River (Chinese: 桑壁河; pinyin: Sāngbì Hé) both flow through the county. The county is located in the southern end of the Lüliang Mountains.

== Climate ==
Climate data for Yonghe, elevation 917 m (3,009 ft), (1991–2020 normals, extremes 1981–2010)
Month	Jan	Feb	Mar	Apr	May	Jun	Jul	Aug	Sep	Oct	Nov	Dec	Year
Record high °C (°F)	17.3 (63.1)	22.5 (72.5)	29.4 (84.9)	36.3 (97.3)	35.9 (96.6)	39.6 (103.3)	38.7 (101.7)	36.1 (97.0)	36.6 (97.9)	29.5 (85.1)	24.4 (75.9)	16.4 (61.5)	39.6 (103.3)
Mean daily maximum °C (°F)	2.0 (35.6)	6.7 (44.1)	13.5 (56.3)	20.8 (69.4)	25.9 (78.6)	29.9 (85.8)	30.9 (87.6)	28.8 (83.8)	23.9 (75.0)	17.8 (64.0)	10.5 (50.9)	3.5 (38.3)	17.9 (64.1)
Daily mean °C (°F)	−6.4 (20.5)	−1.8 (28.8)	5.0 (41.0)	12.4 (54.3)	17.9 (64.2)	22.2 (72.0)	24.1 (75.4)	22.1 (71.8)	16.6 (61.9)	9.6 (49.3)	2.3 (36.1)	−4.5 (23.9)	10.0 (49.9)
Mean daily minimum °C (°F)	−11.9 (10.6)	−7.5 (18.5)	−1.4 (29.5)	5.0 (41.0)	10.2 (50.4)	15.0 (59.0)	18.3 (64.9)	17.1 (62.8)	11.6 (52.9)	4.2 (39.6)	−2.9 (26.8)	−9.7 (14.5)	4.0 (39.2)
Record low °C (°F)	−24.3 (−11.7)	−19.7 (−3.5)	−16.6 (2.1)	−7.9 (17.8)	−0.3 (31.5)	5.5 (41.9)	10.6 (51.1)	8.4 (47.1)	−1.1 (30.0)	−9.1 (15.6)	−18.9 (−2.0)	−24.9 (−12.8)	−24.9 (−12.8)
Average precipitation mm (inches)	3.6 (0.14)	5.9 (0.23)	10.8 (0.43)	27.2 (1.07)	39.8 (1.57)	54.2 (2.13)	119.1 (4.69)	110.9 (4.37)	72.4 (2.85)	38.4 (1.51)	16.8 (0.66)	3.1 (0.12)	502.2 (19.77)
Average precipitation days (≥ 0.1 mm)	3.0	3.2	4.0	6.0	7.9	9.1	12.3	11.4	9.1	7.3	4.6	2.1	80
Average snowy days	4.0	4.0	2.0	0.4	0	0	0	0	0	0.2	2.2	3.2	16
Average relative humidity (%)	56	53	48	46	49	56	67	73	74	71	64	57	60
Mean monthly sunshine hours	177.6	168.9	202.5	224.2	244.0	232.0	218.7	203.3	176.1	178.8	170.1	174.7	2,370.9
Percentage possible sunshine	57	55	54	57	56	53	49	49	48	52	56	59	54
Source: China Meteorological Administration

== Administrative divisions ==
Yonghe County administers two towns and five townships.

=== Towns ===
The county's two towns are Zhihe and Sangbi.

=== Townships ===
The county's five townships are Gedi Township, Nanzhuang Township, Dashiyao Township, Potou Township, and Jiaokou Township.

== Demographics ==
In the 2010 Chinese Census, the county's population totaled 63,649, up from the 61,001 recorded in the 2000 Chinese Census. A 1996 estimate put the county's population at approximately 60,000.
