= Tongkou =

Coordinates: 38°47′43″N 115°52′11″E

Tongkou (Chinese: 同口; pinyin: Tóngkǒu) is a town located in Anxin County, Hebei, China. It is close to Lake Baiyangdian, the largest freshwater lake in northern China. Now it belongs to Xiong'an New Area.
