= Liulizhuang =

Liulizhuang 刘李庄镇
- Town
- Liulizhuang Zhen
- Location in Hebei Location in China
- Coordinates: 38°48′13.8″N 115°57′05.0″E
- Country: People's Republic of China
- Province: Hebei
- Prefecture-level city: Baoding
- County: Anxin County

Area
  - Total: 68.25 km^{2} (26.35 sq mi)

Population (2010)
  - Total: 45,276
  - Density: 663.4/km^{2} (1,718/sq mi)
- Time zone: UTC+8 (China Standard)
- Area code: 312

Liulizhuang (Chinese: 刘李庄镇; pinyin: Liúlǐzhuāng Zhèn) is a town in Anxin County, under the jurisdiction of Baoding, Hebei Province, China. As of the 2010 census, it had a population of 45,276. The population was composed of 23,075 males and 22,201 females. There were 9,473 residents under the age of 14, 32,463 aged between 15 and 64, and 3,340 aged 65 and over.

== See also ==
- List of township-level divisions of Hebei
