= Laohetou =

Town in Anxin County, Hebei, China

Laohetou 老河头镇
- Town
- Laohetou Zhen
- Location in Hebei Location in China
- Coordinates: 38°50′45.6″N 115°45′02.0″E
- Country: People's Republic of China
- Province: Hebei
- Prefecture-level city: Baoding
- County: Anxin County

Area
  - Total: 58.65 km^{2} (22.64 sq mi)

Population (2010)
  - Total: 41,260
  - Density: 703.5/km^{2} (1,822/sq mi)
- Time zone: UTC+8 (China Standard)
- Area code: 312

Laohetou (Chinese: 老河头镇; pinyin: Lǎohétóu Zhèn) is a town in Anxin County, under the jurisdiction of Baoding, Hebei Province, China. As of the 2010 census, it had a population of 41,260. The population included 21,248 males and 20,012 females. Among them, 9,034 were aged under 14, 29,465 were between 15 and 64, and 2,761 were 65 years old or above.

== See also ==
- List of township-level divisions of Hebei
