= Dawang, Hebei =

Dawang 大王镇
- Town
- Dawang Zhen
- Location in Hebei Location in China
- Coordinates: 38°59′02.1″N 115°56′18.2″E
- Country: People's Republic of China
- Province: Hebei
- Prefecture-level city: Baoding
- County: Anxin County

Area
  - Total: 77.22 km^{2} (29.81 sq mi)

Population (2010)
  - Total: 26,538
  - Density: 343.6/km^{2} (890/sq mi)
- Time zone: UTC+8 (China Standard)
- Area code: 312

Dawang (Chinese: 大王镇; pinyin: Dàwáng Zhèn) is a town in Anxin County, under the jurisdiction of Baoding, Hebei Province, China. As of the 2010 census, it had a population of 26,538. Of the population, 13,707 were male and 12,831 were female. The age distribution included 5,055 individuals under 14 years old, 19,210 aged between 15 and 64, and 2,273 aged 65 and over.

== See also ==
- List of township-level divisions of Hebei
