= Cecun =

Cecun 册村镇
- Town
- Location in Shanxi
- Coordinates: 36°41′09″N 112°36′15″E
- Country: People's Republic of China
- Province: Shanxi
- Prefecture-level city: Changzhi
- County: Qin
- Time zone: UTC+8 (China Standard Time)

Cecun (Chinese: 册村镇; pinyin: Cècūn Zhèn; lit. 'Book Village Town') is a township-level division situated in Qin County, in south-central Shanxi province, China.

It includes: Cecun proper (册村, Cè Cūn), Wusucun (乌苏村, Wūsū Cūn), Xizhaicun (西寨村, Xi Zhàicūn), Beiyujiaocun (北余交村, Běi Yújiāocūn), Nanyujiacun (南余交村, Nán Yújiāo Cūn), Nanzhuangcun (南庄村, Nán Zhuāng Cūn), Xibeicun (西北村, Xīběi Cūn), Nanmafucun (南马服村), Beimafucun (北马服村), Xinzhucun (新柱村, Xīn Zhù Cūn), Dougoucun (陡沟村, Dǒugōu Cūn), Daoxingcun (道兴村, Dàoxìng Cūn), Shangguancun (上官村, Shàngguān Cūn), Huipozhuangcun (灰坡庄村, Huīpōzhuāng Cūn), Quanzegoucun (泉则沟村, Quánzégōu Cūn), Nanyaoshangcun (南尧上村, Nán Yáoshàng Cūn), Yanleigoucun (燕垒沟村, Yànlěigōu Cūn), Hezhicun (河止村, Hézhǐ Cūn), Manshuicun (漫水村, Mànshuǐ Cūn), Xiawancun (下湾村, Xiàwān Cūn), Houquancun (后泉村, Hòuquán Cūn), Sizhuangcun (寺庄村, Sì Zhuāng Cūn), Hougoucun (后沟村, Hòugōu Cūn), Yaoshancun (尧山村, Yáoshān Cūn), Dongshancun (东山村, Dōngshān Cūn), Wenzhuangcun (温庄村, Wēn Zhuāng Cūn), Gaozhuanggoucun (高庄沟村, Gāozhuānggōu Cūn), Yangjiapucun (杨家铺村, Yáng Jiā Pù Cūn).

== See also ==
- List of township-level divisions of Shanxi
