= Hubei Township =

Hubei Township 虎北乡
- Township
- Location in Shanxi
- Coordinates: 38°59′54″N 112°0′43″E
- Country: People's Republic of China
- Province: Shanxi
- Prefecture-level city: Xinzhou
- County: Shenchi County
- Time zone: UTC+8 (China Standard)

Hubei Township (simplified Chinese: 虎北乡; traditional Chinese: 虎北鄉; pinyin: Hǔběi Xiāng) is a township under the administration of Shenchi County in Shanxi, China. As of 2020, it has five villages under its administration:

- Hubei Village
- Shankoushang Village (山口上村)
- Shankou Village (山口村)
- Tangjian Village (塘涧村)
- Ximaojiazao Village (西毛家皂村)
