= Nanli Township =

Nanli Township 南里乡
- Township
- Location in Shanxi
- Coordinates: 36°40′3″N 112°40′28″E
- Country: People's Republic of China
- Province: Shanxi
- Prefecture-level city: Changzhi
- County: Qin County
- Time zone: UTC+8 (China Standard)

Nanli Township (simplified Chinese: 南里乡; traditional Chinese: 南里鄉; pinyin: Nánlǐ Xiāng) is a township in Qin County, Shanxi, China. As of 2020, it has 19 villages under its administration:

- Nanli Village
- Xilin Village (西林村)
- Dongzhuang Village (东庄村)
- Houjiazhuang Village (候家庄村)
- Shangzhangzhuang Village (上张庄村)
- Xiazhangzhuang Village (下张庄村)
- Meigou Village (梅沟村)
- Yangjiazhuang Village (杨家庄村)
- Tang Village (唐村)
- Zhongli Village (中里村)
- Zhaojiagou Village (赵家沟村)
- Yaojialing Village (姚家岭村)
- Longmen Village (龙门村)
- Beidishui Village (北底水村)
- Mengjiazhuang Village (孟家庄村)
- Shijiaotou Village (石角头村)
- Getuo Village (圪陀村)
- Shihuo Village (石火村)
- Donglin Village (东林村)
