= Zhihe, Shanxi =

Zhihe 芝河镇
- Town
- Location in Shanxi
- Coordinates: 36°45′45″N 110°37′23″E
- Country: People's Republic of China
- Province: Shanxi
- Prefecture-level city: Linfen
- County: Yonghe County

Area
  - Total: 266.87 km^{2} (103.04 sq mi)

Population (2018)
  - Total: 22,234
  - Density: 83.314/km^{2} (215.78/sq mi)
- Time zone: UTC+8 (China Standard)

Zhihe (Chinese: 芝河; pinyin: Zhīhé) is a town under the administration of Yonghe County, Shanxi, China. The town spans an area of 266.87 square kilometres (103.04 mi^{2}), and has a hukou population of 22,234 as of 2018.

== Administrative divisions ==
As of 2020, it administers four residential neighborhoods and 12 villages:

- Kangxie Community (康谐社区)
- Lianhua Community (莲花社区)
- Chaoyang Community (朝阳社区)
- Binhe Community (滨河社区)
- Chengguan Village (城关村)
- Yaojiawan Village (药家湾村)
- Dongyugou Village (东峪沟村)
- Guanzhuang Village (官庄村)
- Dujiazhuang Village (杜家庄村)
- Yulinze Village (榆林则村)
- Liujiazhuang Village (刘家庄村)
- Huojiagou Village (霍家沟村)
- Xiabagu Village (下罢骨村)
- Honghuagou Village (红花沟村)
- Qianganluhe Village (前甘路河村)
- Changle Village (长乐村)
