= Xinghuacun Fenjiu =

Chinese baijiu distillery

Xinghuacun Fenjiu 杏花村汾酒
- Company type: Public; State-owned enterprise
- Traded as: SSE: 600809
- Industry: Alcoholic drink
- Founded: 1949; 77 years ago
- Headquarters: Xinghuacun, Fenyang, Shanxi, China
- Area served: International
- Key people: Yuan Qingmao (Chairman) (Committee Secretary)
- Products: Baijiu
- Revenue: ▲(2022); CN¥26.2 billion US$3.9 billion
- Number of employees: 13,712
- Website: fenjiu.com.cn

Xinghuacun Fenjiu
- Chinese: 杏花村汾酒
- Literal meaning: Xinghua Village Fenjiu
Transcriptions
Standard Mandarin
- Hanyu Pinyin: xìng huā cūn fén jiǔ
- Wade–Giles: hsing^{4} hua^{1} ts'un^{1} fen^{2} chiew^{3}

Shanxi Xinghuacun Fenjiu Distillery Co. Ltd. (Chinese: 山西杏花村汾酒厂股份有限公司) more commonly known as simply Xinghuacun Fenjiu (Chinese: 杏花村汾酒) is a baijiu distillery headquartered in Xinghuacun, Fenyang, Shanxi, China. The primary output of the distillery, Fenjiu, is a qingxiang baijiu that was one of the "Four Famous Spirits" as determined in the 1952 National Alcohol Appraisal Conference, assigning it as the representative of the eponymously named fēnxiāng (汾香; fen aroma) category that preceded the modern qingxiang designation.

As of 2023 Xinghuacun Fenjiu is the third most valuable spirits brand in the world.

== Product Characteristics ==
Xinghuacun's primary output is "Fenjiu", a historic style of qingxiang (清香; light aroma) baijiu. The fermentation base is made of sorghum that is ground, soaked, cooked, and cooled before being mixed with a barley and pea based qū. This mixture is fermented for a month in an earthen jar and distilled, producing once used grain and some amount of spirit. The used grain goes through the process again being mixed with qū, fermented for a month, and distilled. At this point the grain is considered spent and discarded and the two spirits are blended together at which point it will be aged, usually for about a year, blended, proofed, bottled, and sold.

This process produces a spirit with significant levels of ethyl acetate and ethyl lactate resulting in a light aroma that is sometimes described as having floral, herbaceous, and or stone-fruit notes.

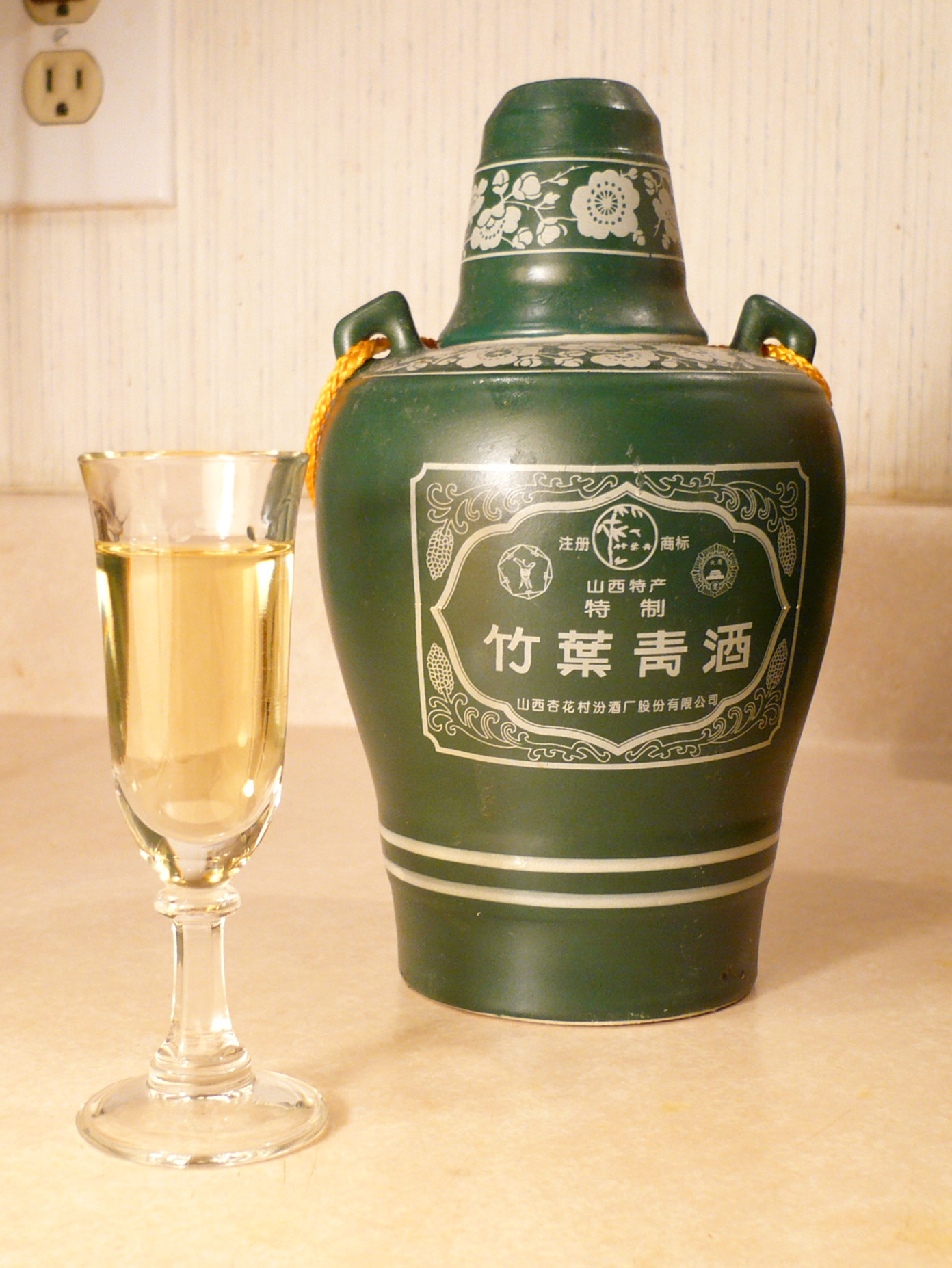
A higher end bottle of Zhuyeqingjiu

Xinghuacun also produces "Zhuyeqingjiu" (Chinese: 竹叶青酒; pinyin: zhú yè qīng jiǔ; lit. 'bamboo leaf green spirit'), a sweeted herbal liqueur infused with sharen, zitan, dong quai, chenpi, clove, linxiang cao, yunmuxiang, among other herbs with a base of fenjiu itself.

== History ==
According to recent archaeological findings, the production of alcohol in Xinghua village began about 6,000 years ago as early forms of grain wine were developed.

Over the centuries, as the processes of saccharification and fermentation were improved upon, a predecessor to the modern Fenjiu, Fenqingjiu, was developed during the Tang dynasty and received praise in the Book of Northern Qi. The process of fermentation and distillation developed in Xinghua Village became an increasingly cohesive and finalized technique that much resembled the modern Fengjiu during the Song and Yuan dynasties (960–1368). During the Ming dynasty (1368–1644) merchants from Shanxi began to travel across China and spread both Fenjiu and the techniques of distillation which gave rise to what would become the Qīngxiāng (清香; light aroma) style of baijiu.

In 1919, the Jinyu Fenjiu Corporation was established as one of the first modern distilleries in China and it was upon this foundation that the Xinghuacun Fenjiu Distillery was founded in 1949 during the Chinese Civil War shortly before the proclamation of the People's Republic of China.
