= Shenchi County =

Shenchi County 神池县 Shenchih
- County
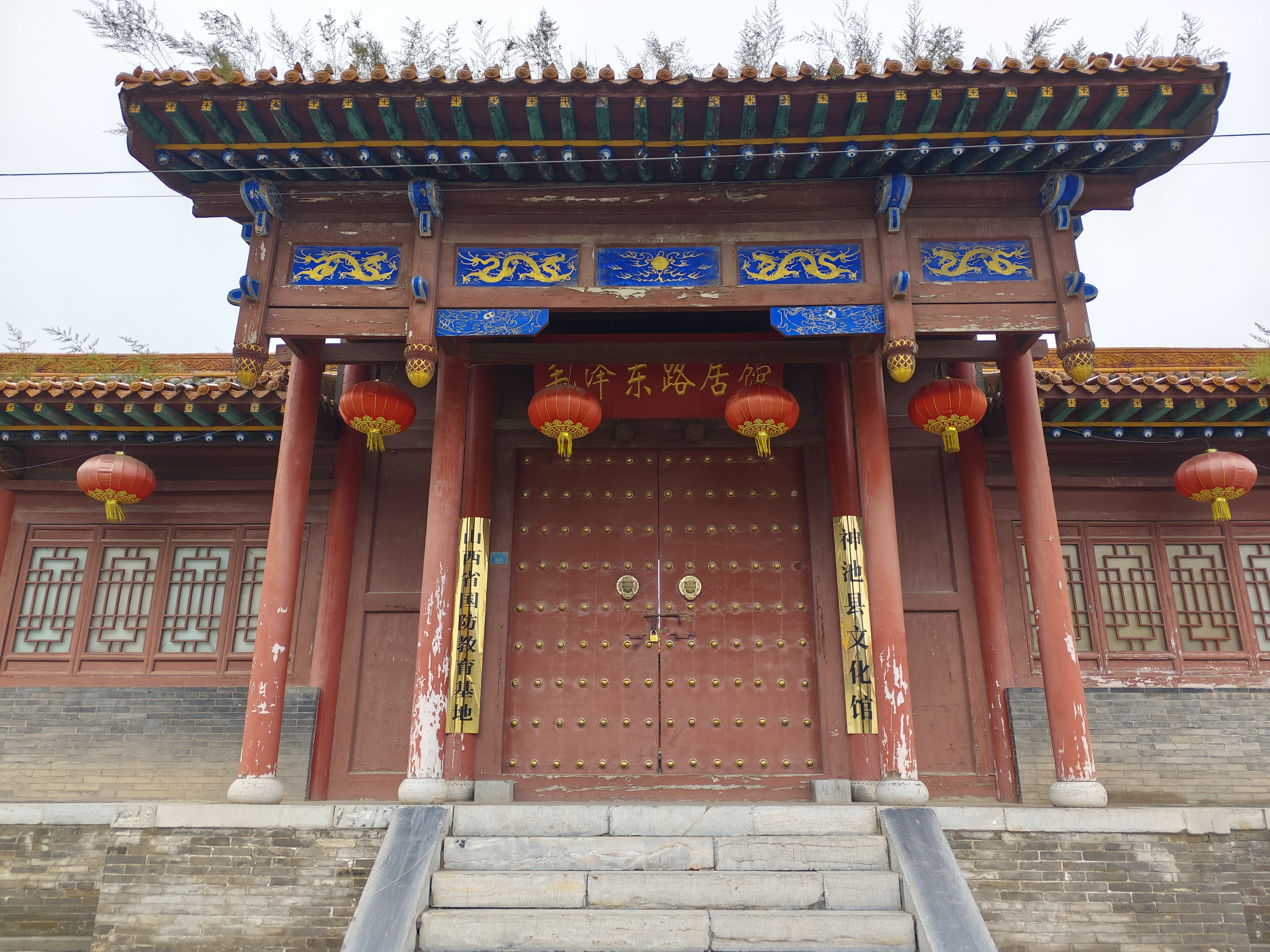

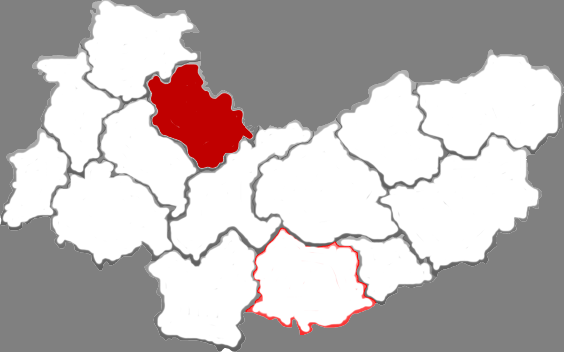
- Location in Xinzhou

- Location of the seat in Shanxi
- Coordinates: 39°05′30″N 112°12′37″E
- Country: People's Republic of China
- Province: Shanxi
- Prefecture-level city: Xinzhou
- Time zone: UTC+8 (China Standard)

Shenchi County (Chinese: 神池县; pinyin: Shénchí Xiàn) is a county in the northwest of Shanxi province, China. It is under the administration of Xinzhou city.

== Climate ==
Climate data for Shenchi, elevation 1,525 m (5,003 ft), (1991–2020 normals, extremes 1981–2010)
Month	Jan	Feb	Mar	Apr	May	Jun	Jul	Aug	Sep	Oct	Nov	Dec	Year
Record high °C (°F)	10.6 (51.1)	17.5 (63.5)	22.9 (73.2)	31.6 (88.9)	31.2 (88.2)	36.0 (96.8)	35.3 (95.5)	31.9 (89.4)	32.5 (90.5)	25.1 (77.2)	19.8 (67.6)	12.9 (55.2)	36.0 (96.8)
Mean daily maximum °C (°F)	−4.1 (24.6)	0.1 (32.2)	6.7 (44.1)	14.5 (58.1)	20.5 (68.9)	24.4 (75.9)	25.6 (78.1)	23.7 (74.7)	19.3 (66.7)	12.6 (54.7)	4.5 (40.1)	−2.5 (27.5)	12.1 (53.8)
Daily mean °C (°F)	−10.3 (13.5)	−6.5 (20.3)	0.1 (32.2)	7.6 (45.7)	13.9 (57.0)	18.1 (64.6)	19.9 (67.8)	18.0 (64.4)	12.9 (55.2)	6.1 (43.0)	−1.5 (29.3)	−8.3 (17.1)	5.8 (42.5)
Mean daily minimum °C (°F)	−15.2 (4.6)	−11.8 (10.8)	−5.8 (21.6)	0.9 (33.6)	6.8 (44.2)	11.7 (53.1)	14.5 (58.1)	12.8 (55.0)	7.3 (45.1)	0.7 (33.3)	−6.3 (20.7)	−12.9 (8.8)	0.2 (32.4)
Record low °C (°F)	−29.0 (−20.2)	−27.2 (−17.0)	−24.0 (−11.2)	−13.4 (7.9)	−4.9 (23.2)	0.5 (32.9)	5.2 (41.4)	3.0 (37.4)	−2.9 (26.8)	−12.9 (8.8)	−24.0 (−11.2)	−27.9 (−18.2)	−29.0 (−20.2)
Average precipitation mm (inches)	3.6 (0.14)	6.0 (0.24)	10.0 (0.39)	23.0 (0.91)	40.4 (1.59)	71.3 (2.81)	106.6 (4.20)	112.4 (4.43)	66.6 (2.62)	30.9 (1.22)	11.2 (0.44)	3.6 (0.14)	485.6 (19.13)
Average precipitation days (≥ 0.1 mm)	3.8	4.5	4.7	6.0	8.6	11.8	13.9	13.0	10.3	7.1	5.0	4.0	92.7
Average snowy days	5.9	6.1	6.3	3.0	0.4	0	0	0	0	1.7	5.2	5.9	34.5
Average relative humidity (%)	55	51	45	41	42	53	67	71	67	60	55	54	55
Mean monthly sunshine hours	197.1	193.0	232.1	249.0	272.6	245.2	238.7	231.6	214.7	216.2	191.4	182.2	2,663.8
Percentage possible sunshine	65	63	62	62	61	55	53	55	58	63	64	63	60
Source: China Meteorological Administration
