= Duancun =

Duancun 端村镇
- Town
- Duancun Zhen
- Location in Hebei Location in China
- Coordinates: 38°51′11.4″N 115°56′32.9″E
- Country: People's Republic of China
- Province: Hebei
- Prefecture-level city: Baoding
- County: Anxin County

Area
  - Total: 67.42 km^{2} (26.03 sq mi)

Population (2010)
  - Total: 39,136
  - Density: 580.5/km^{2} (1,503/sq mi)
- Time zone: UTC+8 (China Standard)
- Area code: 312

Duancun (Chinese: 端村镇; pinyin: Duāncūn Zhèn) is a town in Anxin County, under the jurisdiction of Baoding, Hebei Province, China. As of the 2010 census, it had a population of 39,136. Of the population, 19,561 were male and 19,575 were female. The age distribution included 7,494 individuals under 14 years old, 28,509 aged between 15 and 64, and 3,133 aged 65 and over.

== See also ==
- List of township-level divisions of Hebei
