= Xinghuacun, Shanxi =

Xinghuacun 杏花村镇
- Town
- Location in Shanxi
- Coordinates: 37°20′4″N 111°54′13″E
- Country: People's Republic of China
- Province: Shanxi
- Prefecture-level city: Lüliang
- County-level city: Fenyang
- Time zone: UTC+8 (China Standard)

Xinghuacun (Chinese: 杏花村; pinyin: Xìnghuācūn) is a town in Fenyang, Lüliang, Shanxi Province, China. As of 2020, it administers Fenjiu Residential Community (汾酒社区) and the following ten villages:

- Dongbao Village (东堡村)
- Xibao Village (西堡村)
- Fenghaogou Village (冯郝沟村)
- Anshang Village (安上村)
- Xiaoxiang Village (小相村)
- Shangbao Village (上堡村)
- Xiabao Village (下堡村)
- Xiaoxiangzhai Village (小相寨村)
- Xinghuacun New Village (杏花村新村)
- Wujiayuan Village (武家垣村)

== Culture ==
Xinghuacun has historically been a major center for the production of fenjiu, a popular type of Chinese sorghum liquor. Archaeological relics suggest that alcohol has been produced in the region of present-day Xinghuacun as early as approximately 4000 BCE. The company Xinghuacun Fenjiu was founded in the town, and continues to bear its name.
