= Sunji, Shanxi =

Sunji 孙吉镇
- Town
- Location in Shanxi
- Coordinates: 35°19′59″N 110°30′33″E
- Country: China
- Province: Shanxi
- Prefecture-level city: Yuncheng
- County: Linyi

Area
  - Total: 81.9 km^{2} (31.6 sq mi)
- Elevation: 550 m (1,800 ft)

Population (2008)
  - Total: 52,658
  - Density: 643/km^{2} (1,670/sq mi)
  - Hukou permits: 12,349
- Time zone: UTC+8 (China Standard)
- Postal code: 044103

Sunji (simplified Chinese: 孙吉镇; traditional Chinese: 孫吉鎮; pinyin: Sūnjí Zhèn) is a town of around 52,700 people in the southwest of Shanxi province, People's Republic of China, Hancheng under the administration of Linyi County, 26 kilometres (16 mi) to the east-southeast. It administers 45 villages.
