= Pingshu Township =

Pingshu Township 平舒乡
- Township
- Location in Shanxi
- Coordinates: 37°57′32″N 113°3′27″E
- Country: People's Republic of China
- Province: Shanxi
- Prefecture-level city: Jinzhong
- County: Shouyang County
- Time zone: UTC+8 (China Standard)

Pingshu Township (simplified Chinese: 平舒乡; traditional Chinese: 平舒鄉; pinyin: Píngshū Xiāng) is a township under the administration of Shouyang County in Shanxi, China. As of 2020, it has eleven villages under its administration.

- Pingshu Village
- Tai'an Village (太安村)
- Gucheng Village (古城村)
- Xike Village (西岢村)
- Dongke Village (东岢村)
- Huangling Village (黄岭村)
- Guoyi Village (郭义村)
- Angong Village (安公村)
- Duanwang Village (段王村)
- Shangyu Village (上峪村)
- Longmenhe Village (龙门河村)
