= List of universities and colleges in Shanxi =

The following is List of Universities and Colleges in Shanxi.

== Notation ==
The following notation is used:

- National (Direct): Directly administered by the Chinese Ministry of Education (MOE)
- National (Other): Administered by other ministries
- Ω (National Key Universities): Universities with high regards from the MOE and the Chinese government
- Provincial: Public university administered by the province (or the autonomous region)
- Municipal: Public university administered by the municipality
- Private: Privately owned and funded university, or independent institution
- Mainland-HMT: Mainland China-Hong Kong or Macao or Taiwan joint venture university
- Sino-foreign: Sino-foreign joint venture university

The default list should follow the neutral order provided by MOE, namely the numerical order of identification codes.

== Provincial ==
- Business College of Shanxi University
- Shanxi University (Taiyuan)
- Changzhi College
- Changzhi Medical College
- Taiyuan University
- Lvliang Higher College
- North University of China (Taiyuan)
- Shanxi Datong University
- Shanxi Medical University (Taiyuan)
- Shanxi Traditional Chinese Medicine University (Taiyuan)
- Shanxi Normal University (Linfen)
- Shanxi Normal University Linfen College
- Shanxi Agricultural University (Jinzhong)
- Shanxi University of Finance & Economics (Taiyuan)
- Taiyuan University of Science and Technology
- Taiyuan Normal University
- Taiyuan University of Technology
- Xinzhou Teachers University
- Yuncheng University
