= Yuci District =

Yuci 榆次区
- District
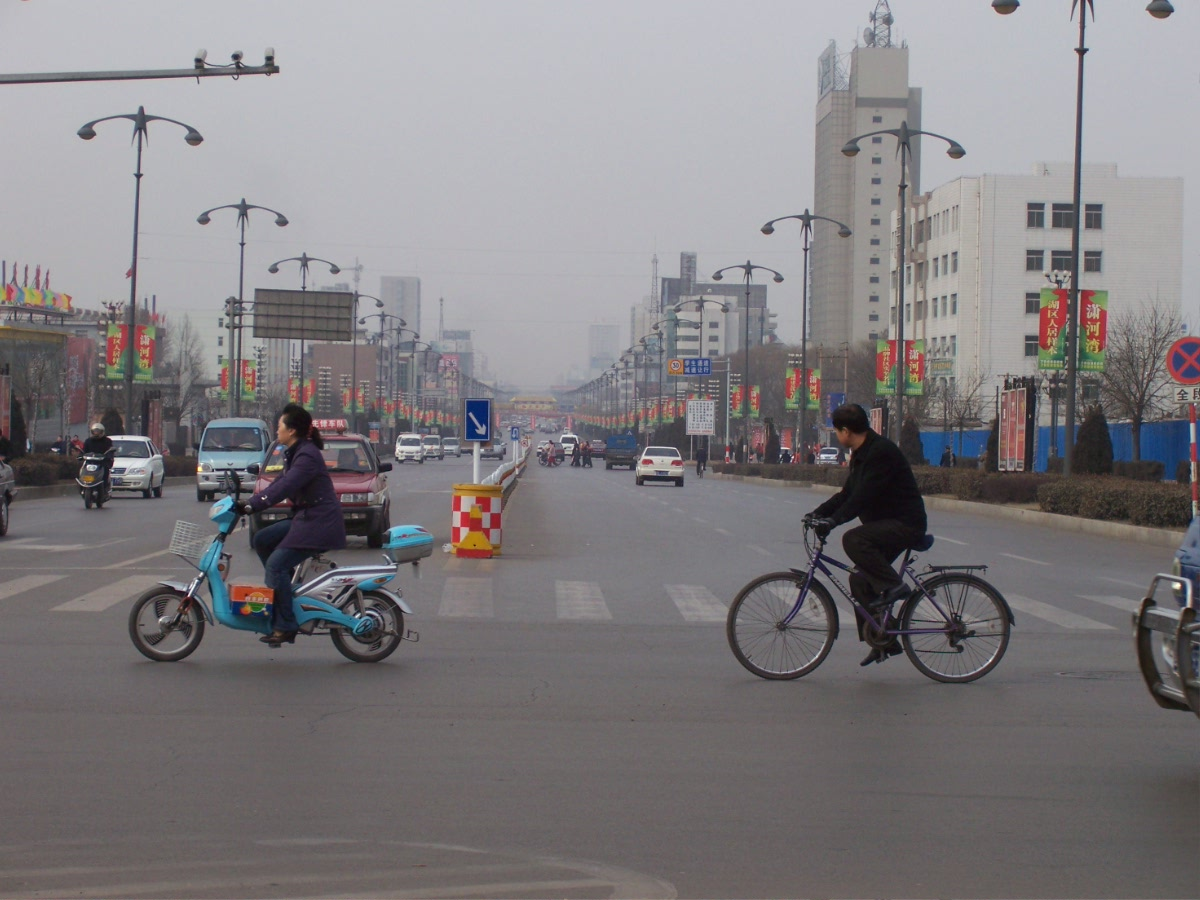
- Yingbin Street (迎宾街), Yuci

- Location in Shanxi
- Coordinates: 37°37′N 112°51′E
- Country: People's Republic of China
- Province: Shanxi
- Prefecture-level city: Jinzhong

Government
  - CCP district committee secretary: Zhang Yingjie (张英杰)
  - District head: Du Jianzhong (杜建中)

Area
  - Total: 1,318 km^{2} (509 sq mi)

Population (2024)
  - Total: 948,048
  - Density: 719.3/km^{2} (1,863/sq mi)
- Time zone: UTC+8 (China Standard)
- Postal code: 030600
- Area code: 0354
- GDP (2024): CN¥47.95 billion
- Website: www.yuci.gov.cn

Yuci District (simplified Chinese: 榆次区; traditional Chinese: 榆次區; pinyin: Yúcì Qū) is a district of Jinzhong, Shanxi, China, and contains the seat of the Jinzhong municipal government.

== Administrative Divisions ==
Yuci District administers nine subdistricts, five towns and four townships:

Subdistricts:

- Beiguan Subdistrict (北关街道), Jinlun Subdistrict (锦纶街道), Xinhua Subdistrict (新华街道), Xinan Subdistrict (西南街道), Luxi Subdistrict (路西街道), Anning Subdistrict (安宁街道), Jingwei Subdistrict (经纬街道), Xinjian Subdistrict (新建街道), Jinhua Subdistrict (晋华街道)

Towns:

- Wujinshan (乌金山镇), Dongyang (东阳镇), Changning (长凝镇), Beitian (北田镇), Xiuwen (修文镇)

Townships:

- Guojiabao Township (郭家堡乡), Zhangqing Township (张庆乡), Zhuangzi Township (庄子乡), Dongzhao Township (东赵乡)

== Climate ==
Climate data for Yuci, elevation 854 m (2,802 ft), (1991–2020 normals, extremes 1981–2010)
| Month | Jan | Feb | Mar | Apr | May | Jun | Jul | Aug | Sep | Oct | Nov | Dec | Year |
|---|---|---|---|---|---|---|---|---|---|---|---|---|---|
| Record high °C (°F) | 12.4 (54.3) | 19.3 (66.7) | 28.2 (82.8) | 37.1 (98.8) | 35.6 (96.1) | 39.6 (103.3) | 39.5 (103.1) | 36.3 (97.3) | 35.8 (96.4) | 28.5 (83.3) | 23.6 (74.5) | 16.0 (60.8) | 39.6 (103.3) |
| Mean daily maximum °C (°F) | 2.2 (36.0) | 6.5 (43.7) | 13.1 (55.6) | 20.5 (68.9) | 26.2 (79.2) | 29.8 (85.6) | 30.7 (87.3) | 28.9 (84.0) | 24.4 (75.9) | 18.2 (64.8) | 10.1 (50.2) | 3.4 (38.1) | 17.8 (64.1) |
| Daily mean °C (°F) | −5.1 (22.8) | −1.0 (30.2) | 5.6 (42.1) | 12.9 (55.2) | 18.9 (66.0) | 22.8 (73.0) | 24.4 (75.9) | 22.7 (72.9) | 17.4 (63.3) | 10.8 (51.4) | 3.1 (37.6) | −3.4 (25.9) | 10.8 (51.4) |
| Mean daily minimum °C (°F) | −10.7 (12.7) | −6.9 (19.6) | −0.9 (30.4) | 5.8 (42.4) | 11.6 (52.9) | 16.2 (61.2) | 19.1 (66.4) | 17.7 (63.9) | 12.1 (53.8) | 5.1 (41.2) | −2.2 (28.0) | −8.5 (16.7) | 4.9 (40.8) |
| Record low °C (°F) | −21.0 (−5.8) | −20.6 (−5.1) | −15.7 (3.7) | −7.0 (19.4) | 0.3 (32.5) | 7.1 (44.8) | 11.6 (52.9) | 9.2 (48.6) | −0.2 (31.6) | −6.9 (19.6) | −18.2 (−0.8) | −22.3 (−8.1) | −22.3 (−8.1) |
| Average precipitation mm (inches) | 2.0 (0.08) | 3.6 (0.14) | 8.6 (0.34) | 25.1 (0.99) | 29.1 (1.15) | 51.4 (2.02) | 99.9 (3.93) | 90.9 (3.58) | 57.9 (2.28) | 32.5 (1.28) | 11.4 (0.45) | 1.9 (0.07) | 414.3 (16.31) |
| Average precipitation days (≥ 0.1 mm) | 1.7 | 2.4 | 3.2 | 5.1 | 5.7 | 9.3 | 11.0 | 10.4 | 7.4 | 5.9 | 3.3 | 1.8 | 67.2 |
| Average snowy days | 3.0 | 3.7 | 2.0 | 0.6 | 0 | 0 | 0 | 0 | 0 | 0.1 | 2.5 | 2.5 | 14.4 |
| Average relative humidity (%) | 48 | 45 | 42 | 43 | 44 | 54 | 67 | 70 | 68 | 62 | 56 | 49 | 54 |
| Mean monthly sunshine hours | 174.4 | 179.1 | 216.7 | 240.3 | 264.0 | 239.8 | 230.0 | 221.3 | 198.7 | 195.6 | 174.8 | 174.9 | 2,509.6 |
| Percentage possible sunshine | 57 | 58 | 58 | 61 | 60 | 54 | 52 | 53 | 54 | 57 | 58 | 59 | 57 |
Source: China Meteorological Administration

== Universities ==
The Shanxi University Town, also known as the Shanxi Higher Education Town, is located in northern Yuci. As of 2024, ten higher-education institutions were based in the university town. Institutions there include Taiyuan University of Technology, Shanxi University of Chinese Medicine, Shanxi Medical University and Taiyuan Normal University.

== Sister cities ==
- Quezon City, Philippines (since 2006)
