= Geely Emgrand L =

Compact family car produced by Chinese auto brand Geely

Geely Emgrand L/GL
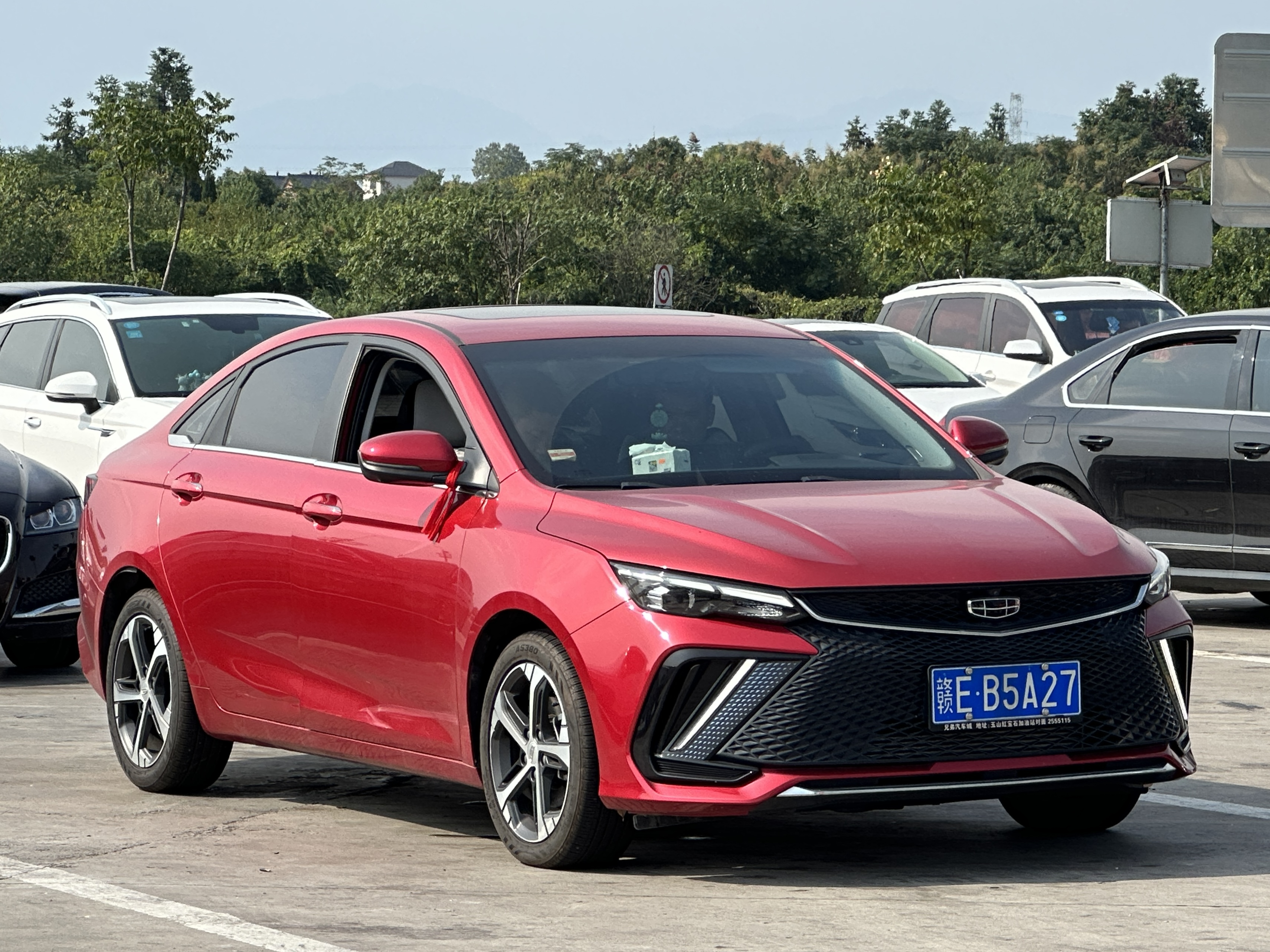
- 2022 Geely Emgrand L

Overview
- Manufacturer: Geely Auto
- Also called: Geely Emgrand GL (2016–2021); Geely Emgrand EV Pro (electric); Shanghai Maple 60S (electric); Livan S6 Pro (2023–present); KMC CR6 (Iran)
- Production: 2016–present

Body and chassis
- Class: Compact car (C)
- Layout: Front-engine, front-wheel-drive
- Platform: Geely FE
- Related: Geely Emgrand S Geometry A Geometry C

Chronology
- Successor: Geely Emgrand (fifth generation)

The Geely Emgrand L and the previous Geely Emgrand GL are small family cars produced by Chinese auto brand Geely Auto under the Emgrand product series. The Emgrand GL was produced from 2016 and the Emgrand L was produced from 2022 as an heavily updated version.

== First generation (Emgrand GL; 2016) ==
Geely Emgrand GL
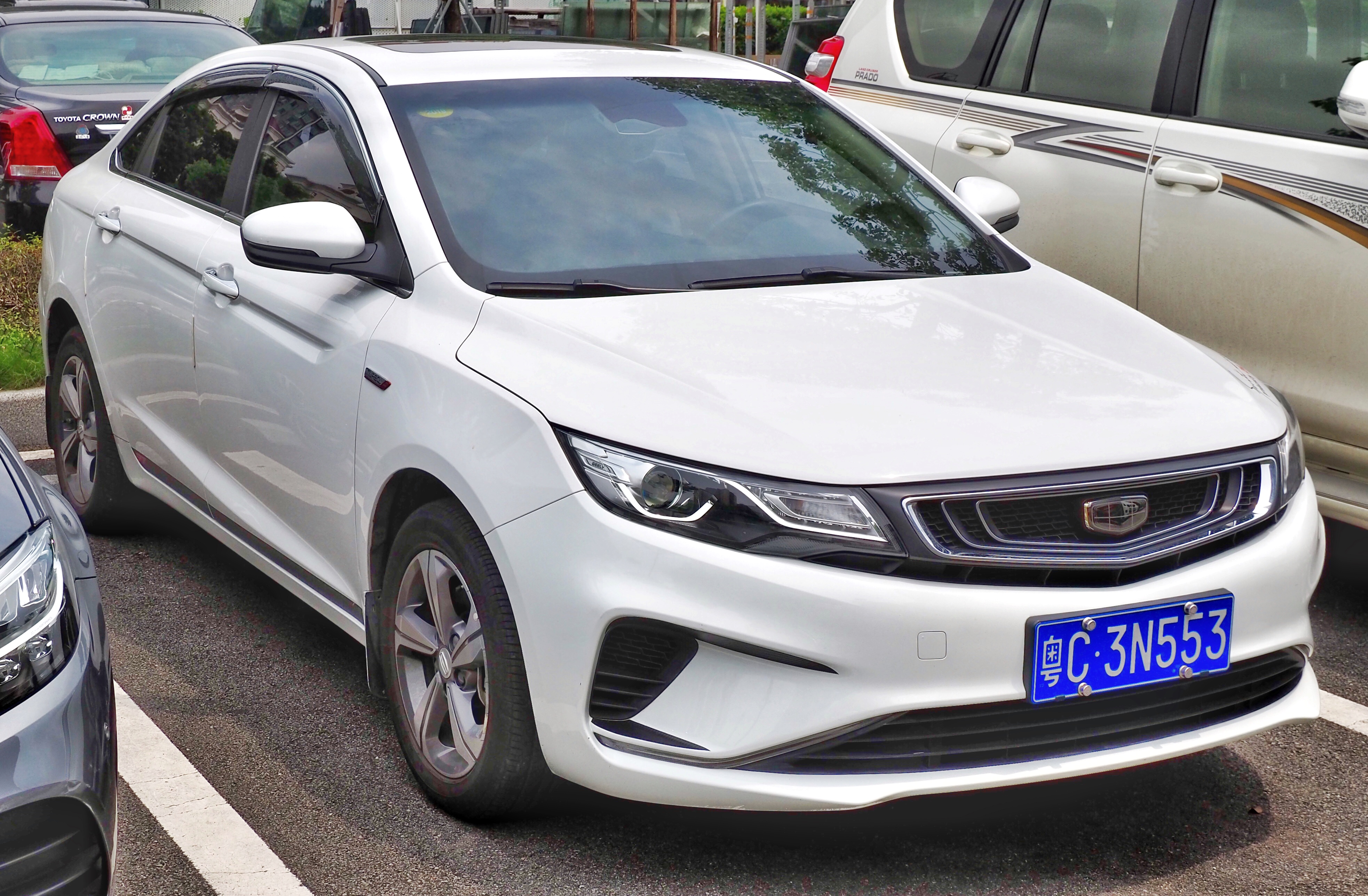
- Geely Emgrand GL facelift

Overview
- Model code: FE-5
- Also called: Geely Emgrand EV Pro (electric); Maple 60S (electric)
- Production: 2016–2021; 2020–2025 (electric)
- Assembly: China: Linhai; Jinzhong

Powertrain
- Engine: 1.3 L 4G13 turbo I4; 1.4 L JLB-4G14TB I4; 1.5 L JLH-3G15TD turbo I3; 1.8 L 4G18 I4
- Electric motor: 150 kW permanent magnet motor/generator (EV)
- Transmission: 6-speed manual 7-speed DCT
- Battery: 11.3 kWh lithium-ion; 52.7 kWh lithium-ion
- Electric range: 66 km (41 mi) (PHEV, NEDC); 421 km (262 mi) (EV, NEDC)

Dimensions
- Wheelbase: 2,700 mm (106.3 in)
- Length: 4,725 mm (186.0 in); 4,755 mm (187.2 in) (EV)
- Width: 1,802 mm (70.9 in)
- Height: 1,478 mm (58.2 in)

The Emgrand GL was launched in 2016. Despite the styling difference, mechanically, the Emgrand GL is the sedan version of the Emgrand GS hatchback. A few interior parts as well as the Engines were shared between the Emgrand GL and the Emgrand GS which are a 1.3-litre turbo engine producing 130 hp (97 kW; 132 PS) and 185 N⋅m (136 lb⋅ft; 19 kg⋅m) of torque, and a 1.8-litre engine producing 133 hp (99 kW; 135 PS) and 170 N⋅m (125 lb⋅ft; 17 kg⋅m) of torque.

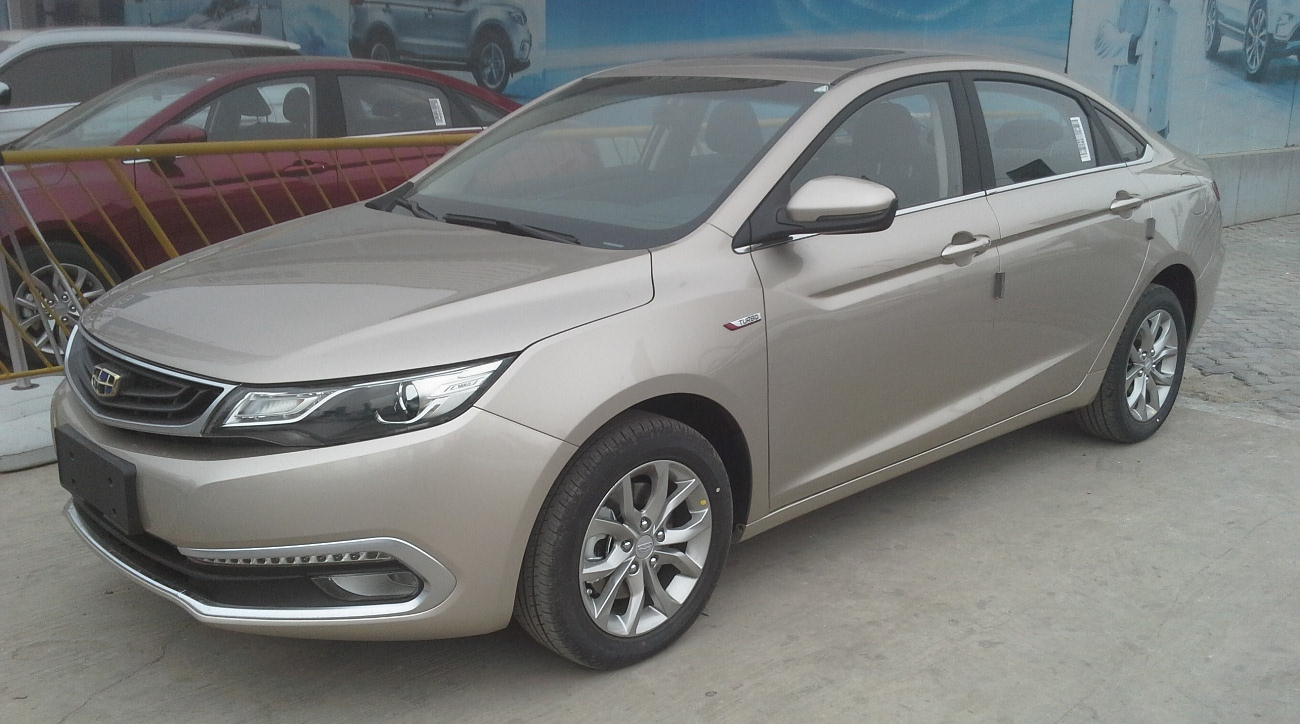
Geely Emgrand GL front.

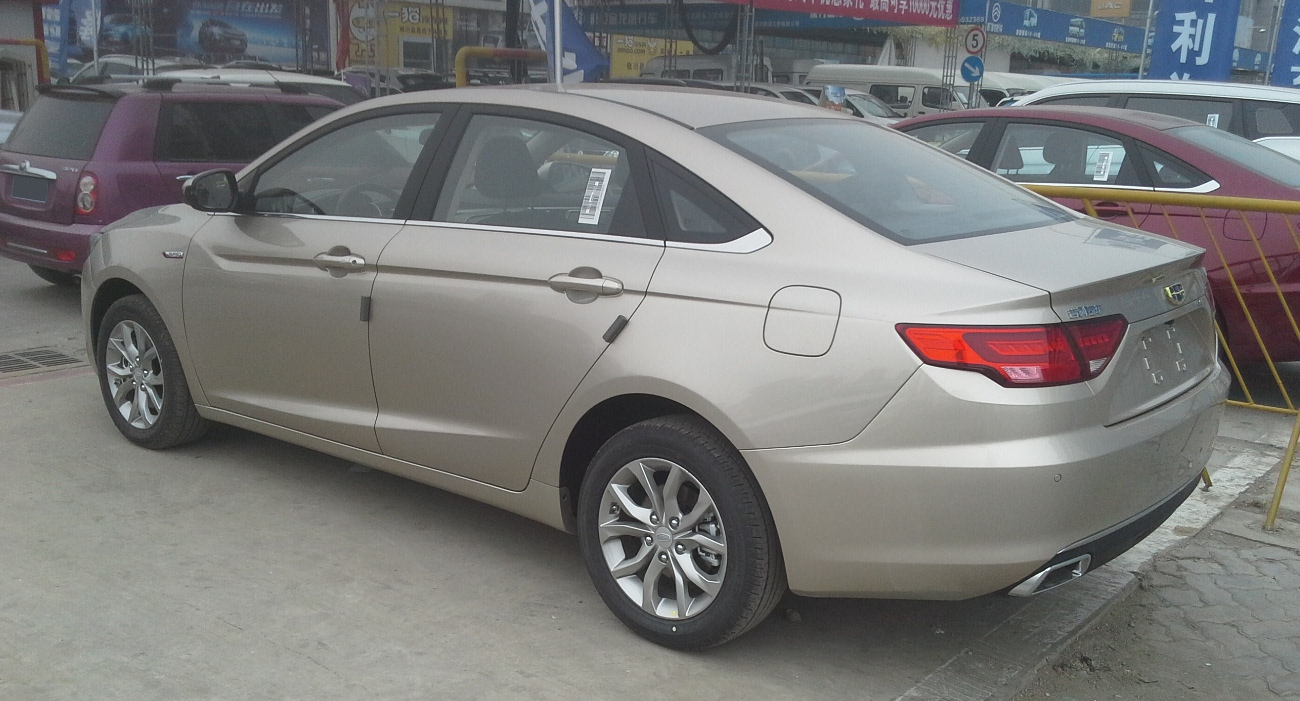
Geely Emgrand GL rear.

=== 2018 facelift ===
The Emgrand GL received a facelift for the 2018 model year. The updated model continues to use the 1.8-litre naturally aspirated engine, while replacing the 1.3-litre turbo engine with a 1.4-litre turbo engine. Both engines produces 133 hp (99 kW; 135 PS) with 170 N⋅m (125 lb⋅ft; 17 kg⋅m) of torque for the 1.8-litre engine and 215 N⋅m (159 lb⋅ft; 22 kg⋅m) of torque for the 1.4 litre turbo engine. Transmission options include a 6-speed manual transmission or a 6-speed DCT gearbox.

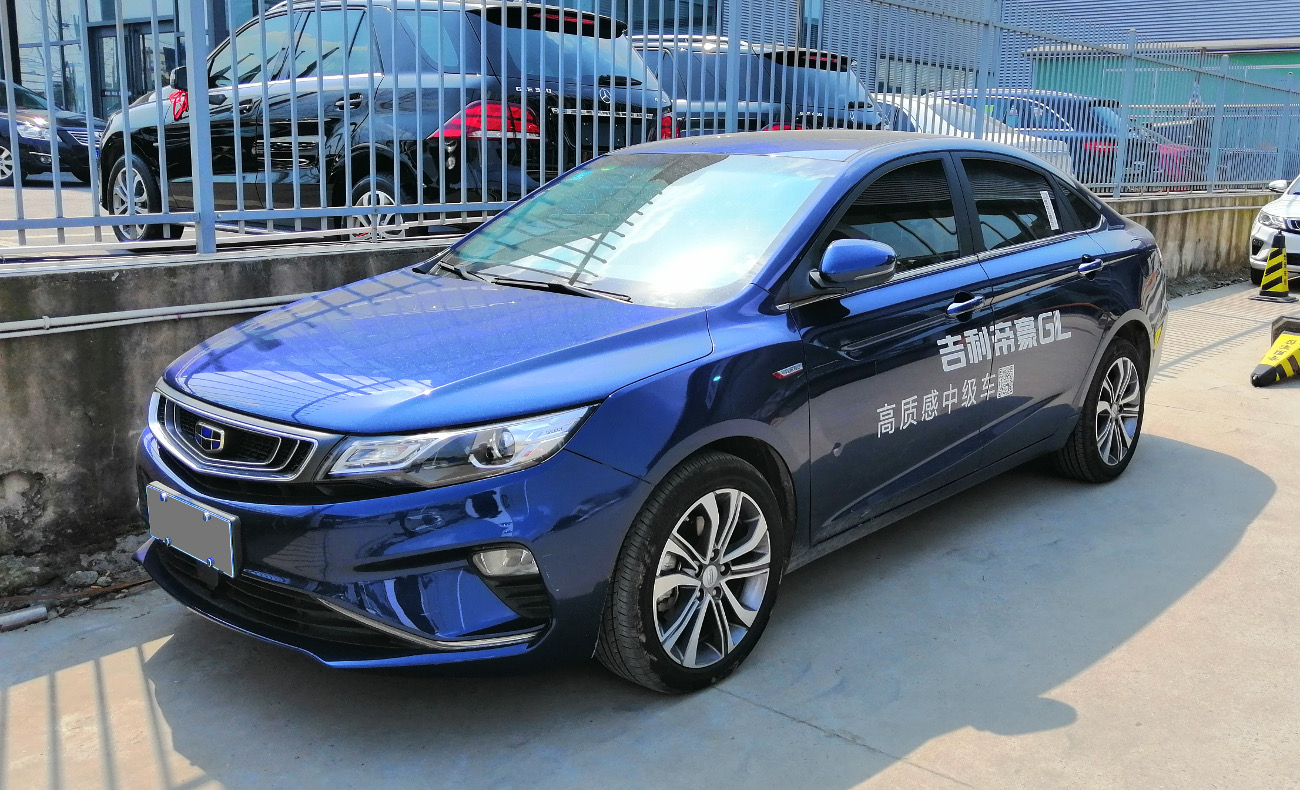
Geely Emgrand GL 2018 facelift front.

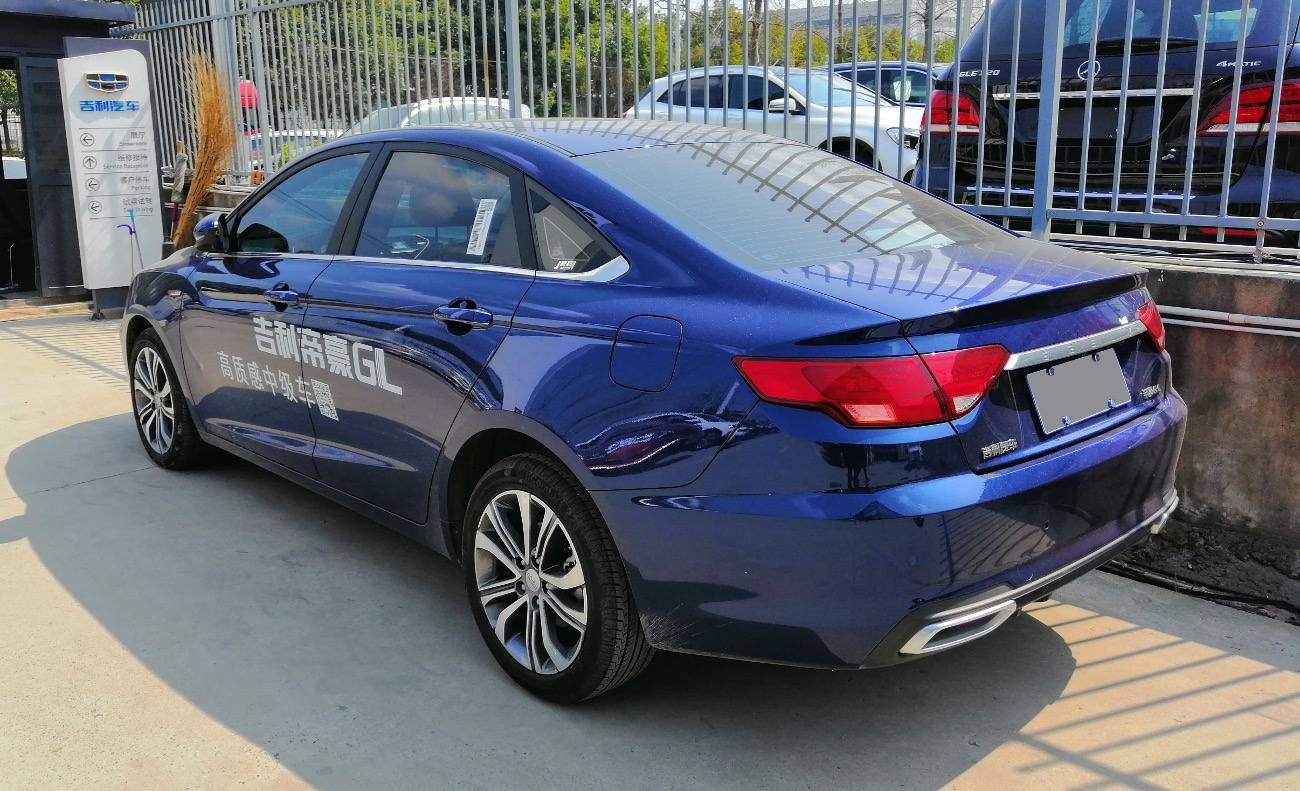
Geely Emgrand GL 2018 facelift rear.

=== 2020 facelift ===
The Emgrand GL received another facelift in 2020 slightly updating the front fascia and rear end designs. The engine is a 1.4-litre turbo engine and a 1.5-litre turbo engine producing 141 hp (105 kW; 143 PS) and 177 hp (132 kW; 179 PS) respectively. Transmission is a 6-speed manual transmission or a CVT, and an additional 7-speed DCT gearbox option for the 1.5-litre turbo engine.

Additional features are a 10.25 inch screen for the center console, the GKUI19 infotainment system with the integration of up to 5 personal devices connecting to hot spot at the same time, a 7-inch digital cluster, CN95 high efficiency air filter, intelligence cruise control, intelligent navigation, lane-keeping assist, AEB-P collision prevention system, speed limit recognition, and intelligent automatic high low beam control.

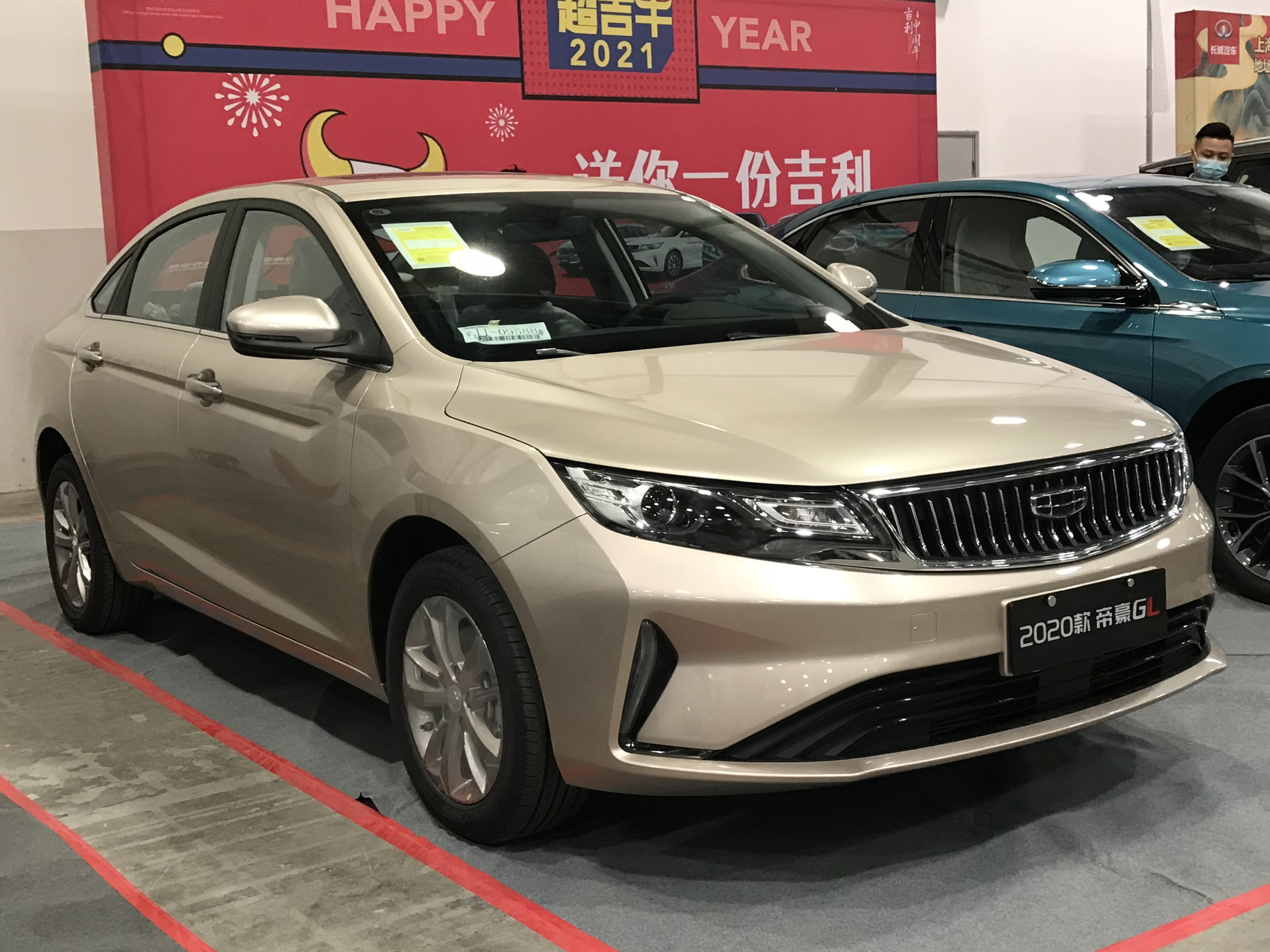
Geely Emgrand GL 2020 facelift front.

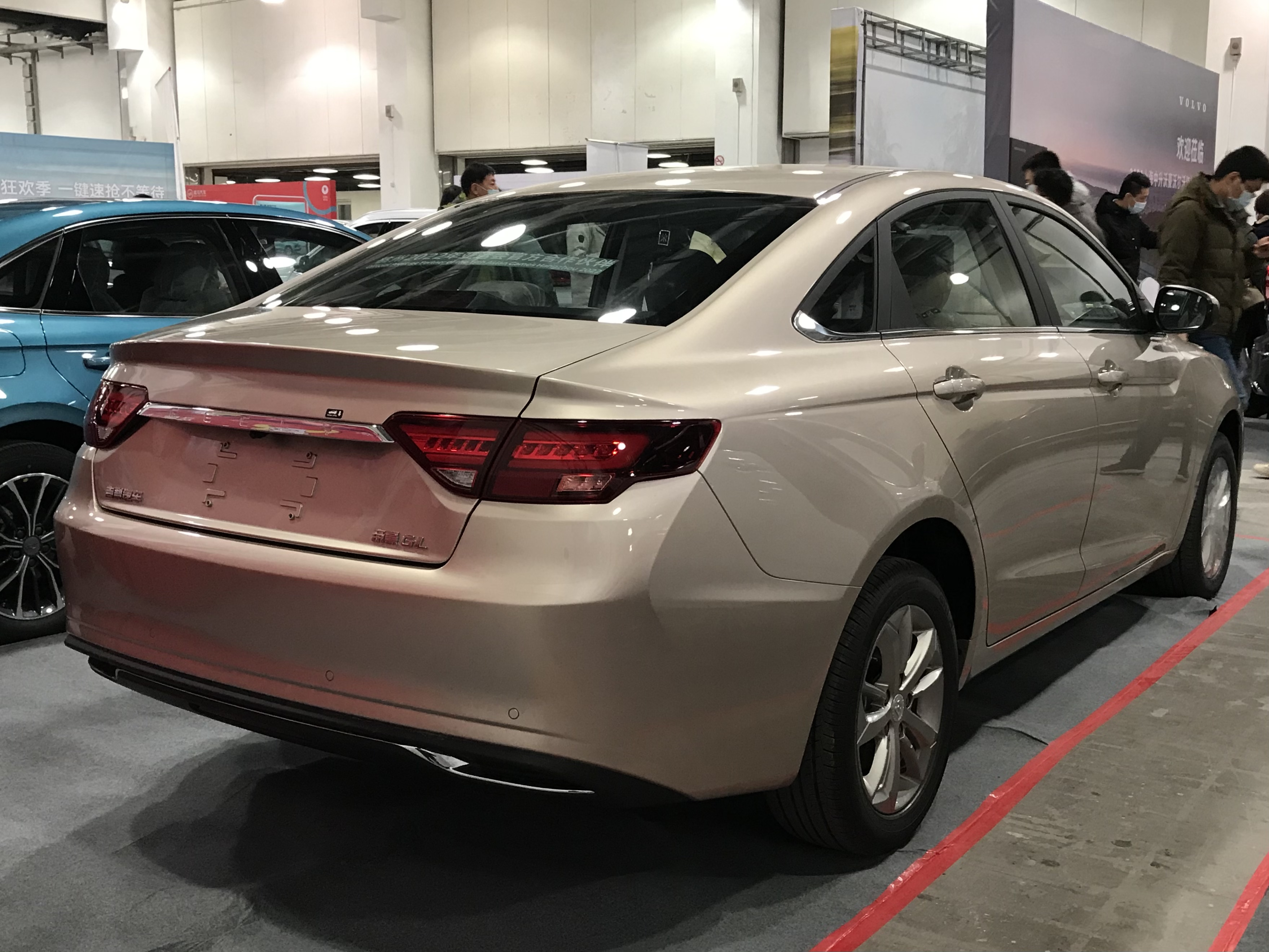
Geely Emgrand GL 2020 facelift rear.

=== Emgrand EV Pro ===
The fully electric version called Emgrand EV Pro debuts in China in December 2020; it has a 52.7 kWh lithium-ion battery positioned in the central section of the frame and is combined with an electric motor produced by Nidec in the front position that delivers 150 kW (201 hp; 204 PS) and 240 N⋅m (177 lb⋅ft; 24 kg⋅m) of maximum torque. The homologated autonomy (NEDC cycle) is 421 kilometres (262 mi). The car is front wheel drive and has a weighs of 1,535 kilograms (3,384 lb).

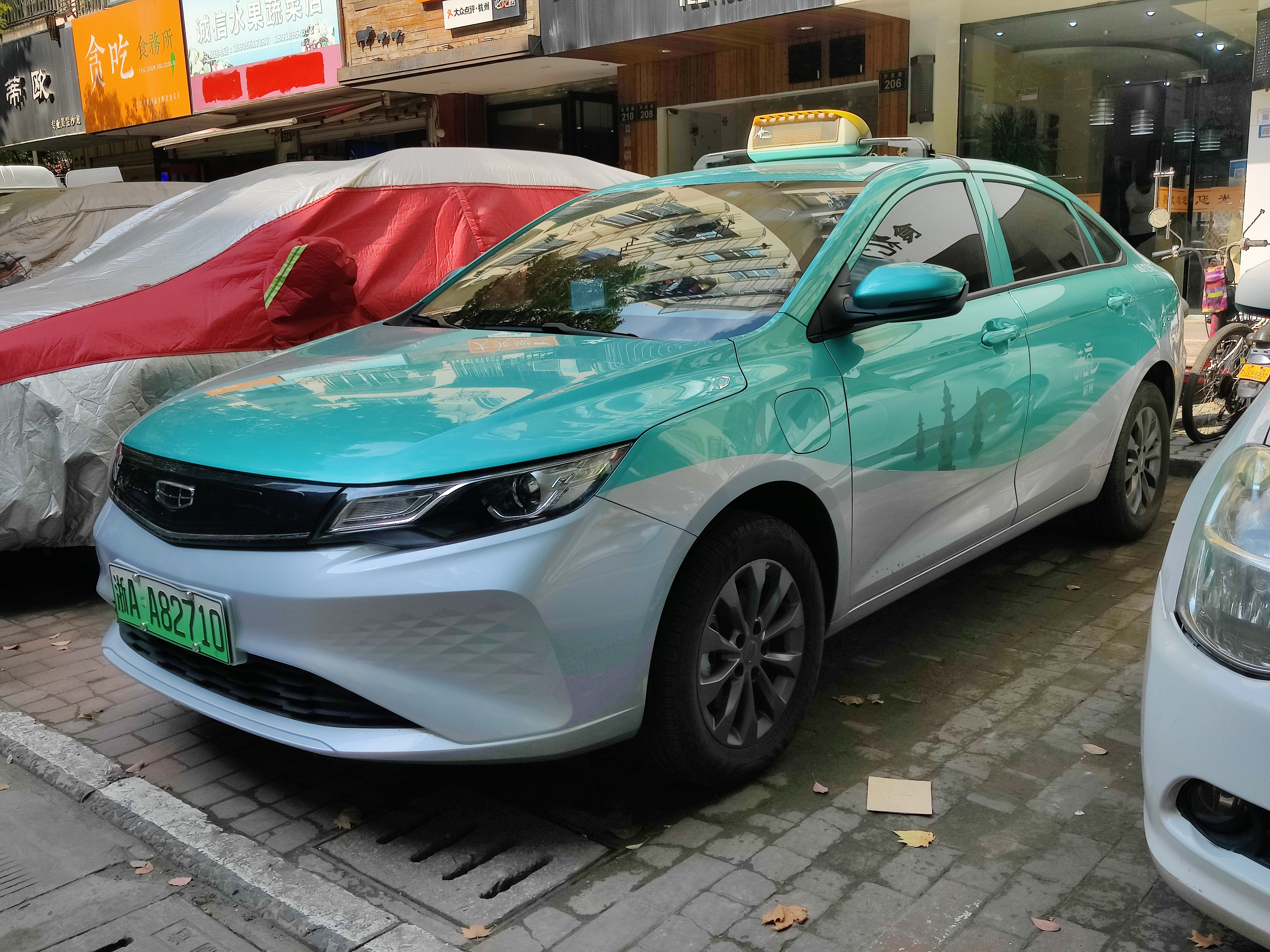
Geely Emgrand EV Pro taxi

=== Maple 60S ===
In 2022 Geely announced the launch of the Maple 60S, Geely's first battery swap enabled electric sedan, produced in association with Livan and based on the Geely Emgrand GL.

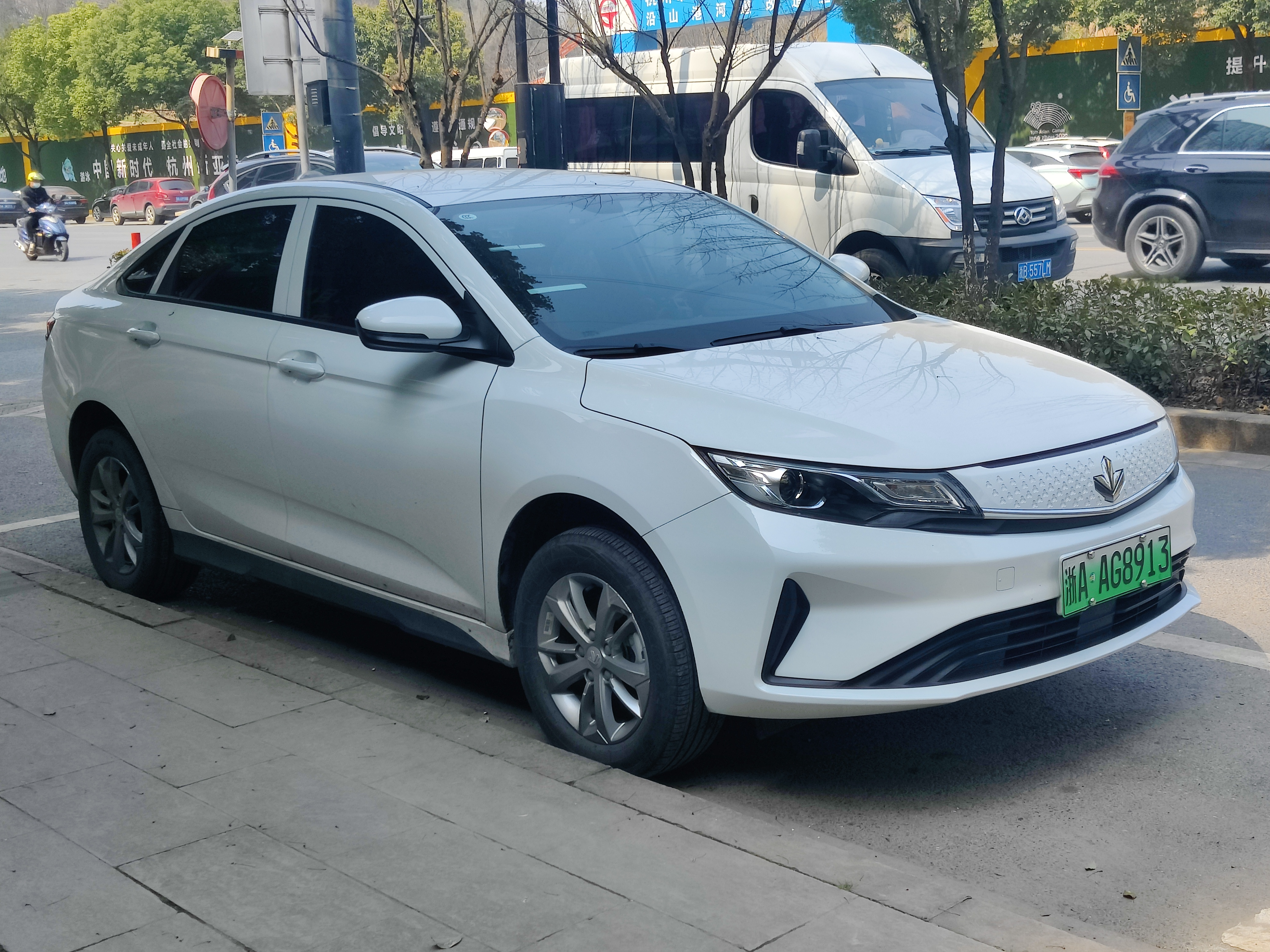
Maple 60S

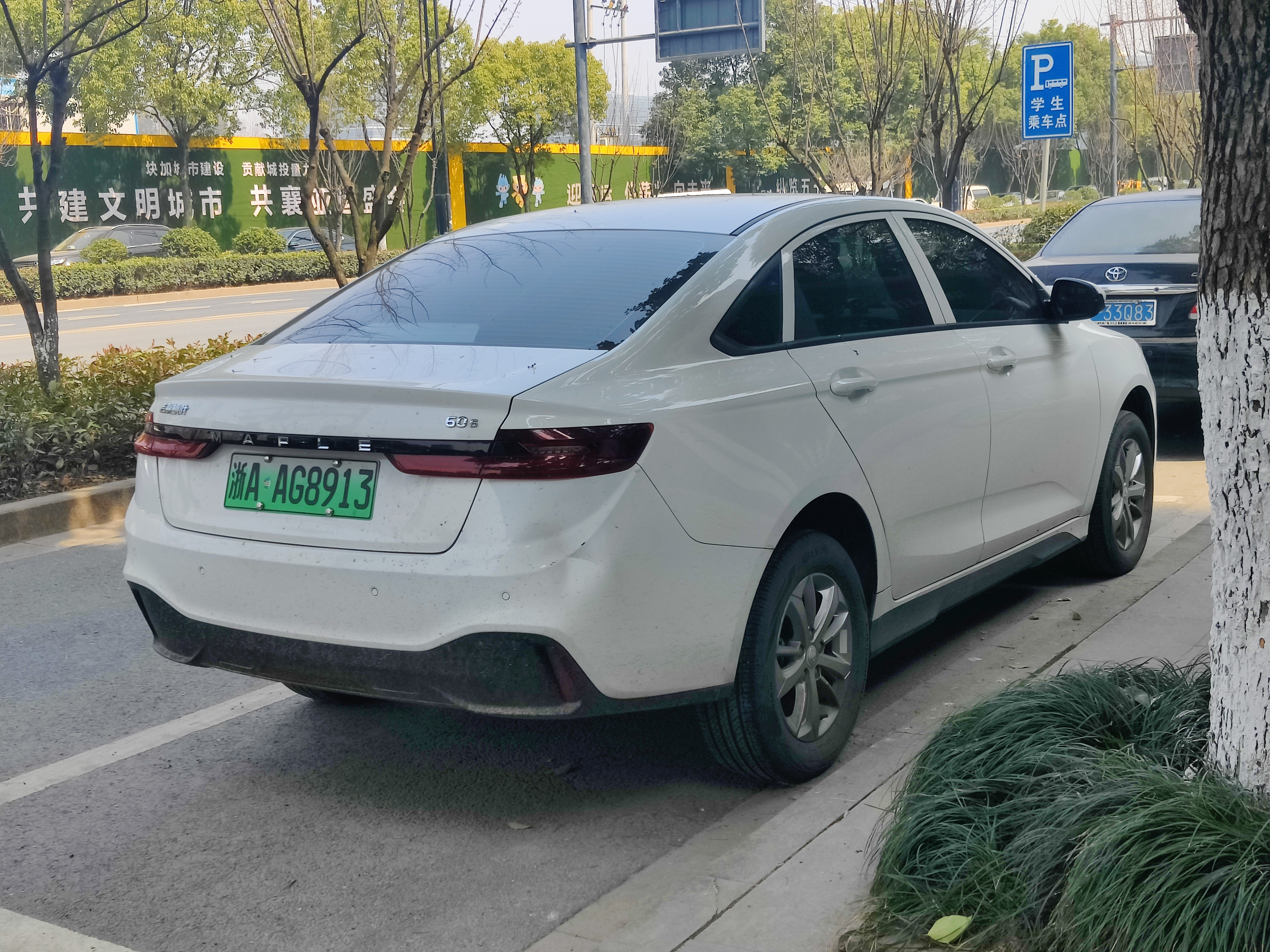
Maple 60S rear

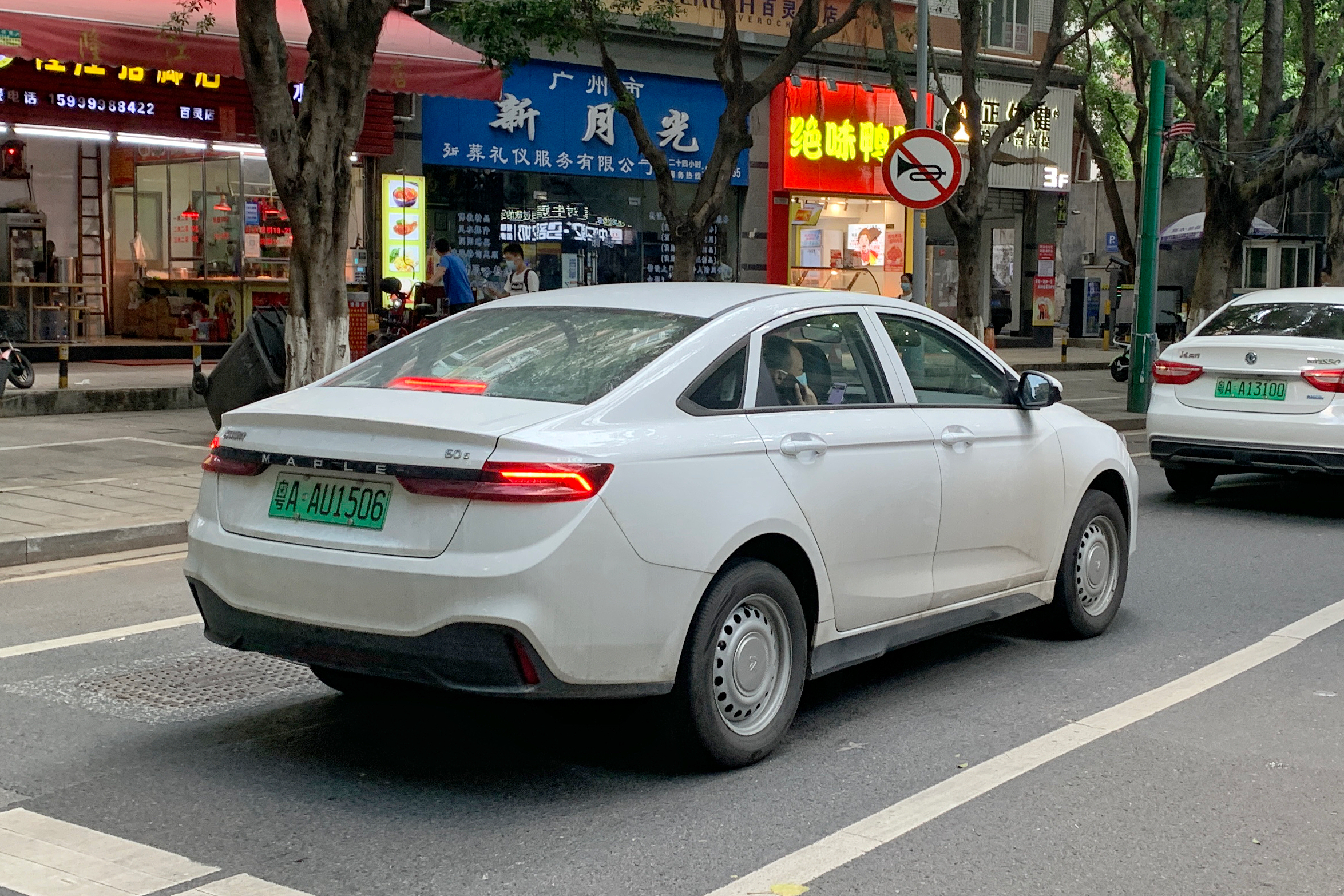
Maple 60S base model

== Second generation (Emgrand L; 2022) ==
Geely Emgrand L
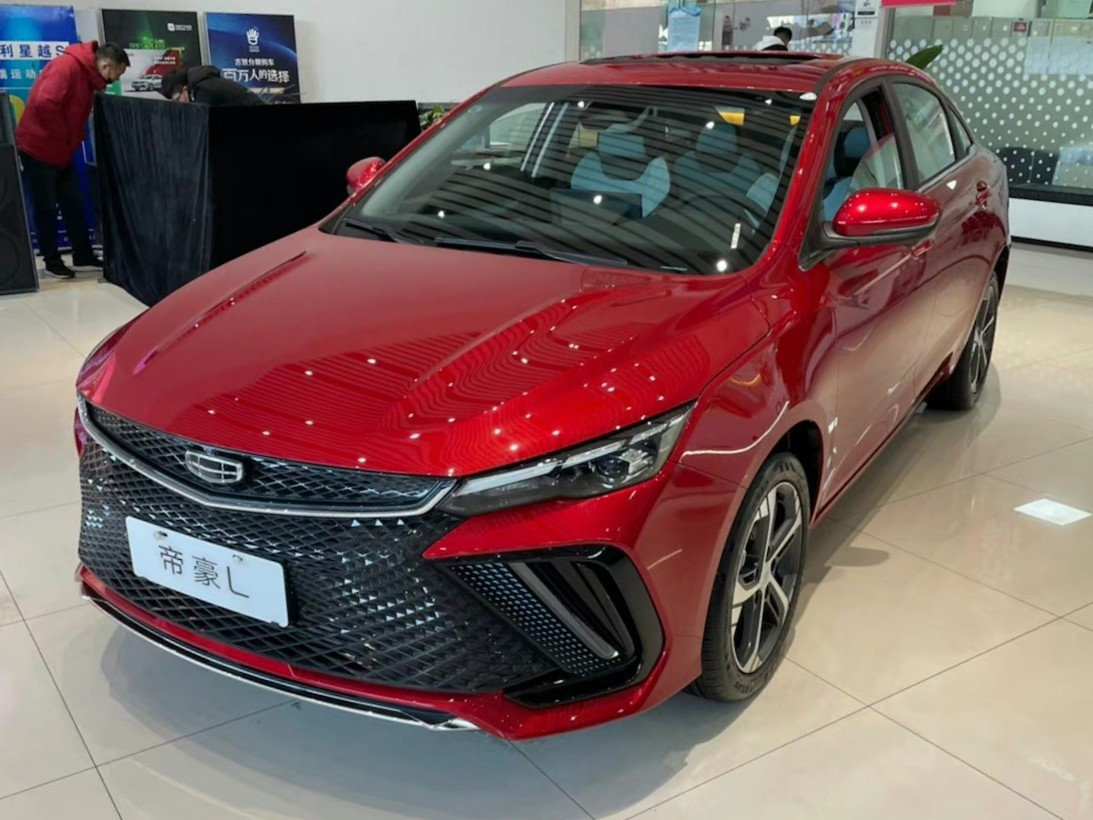
- Geely Emgrand L

Overview
- Model code: FE-5
- Also called: Livan S6 Pro (Russia, 2023–present); KMC CR6 (Iran)
- Production: 2022–present; 2022–2025 (China)
- Assembly: China: Linhai

Powertrain
- Engine: 1.4 L JLB-4G14TB I4
- Electric motor: 150 kW permanent magnet motor/generator (PHEV)
- Transmission: 8-speed CVT; 3-speed DHT (PHEV)
- Battery: 11.3 kWh lithium-ion (PHEV)
- Electric range: 66 km (41 mi) (PHEV, NEDC); 421 km (262 mi) (EV, NEDC)

Dimensions
- Wheelbase: 2,700 mm (106.3 in)
- Length: 4,735 mm (186.4 in)
- Width: 1,815 mm (71.5 in)
- Height: 1,478 mm (58.2 in)

Chronology
- Predecessor: Geely Emgrand GL

The Emgrand L launched in December 2021 as an extensive facelift of the Emgrand GL it replaces. The Emgrand L features a completely redesigned front and rear end featuring Geely's updated Energy Storm design language previewed by the Vision Starburst concept.

In terms of powertrain, the Geely Emgrand L is equipped with an upgraded version of the 1.4-litre turbocharged engine carried over from the Emgrand GL with 141 hp (105 kW; 143 PS) and a maximum torque of 235 N⋅m (173 lb⋅ft; 24 kg⋅m) and matched with an 8-speed CVT gearbox.

The Emgrand L features a 12.3-inch infotainment display that runs on the latest FOTA cloud intelligence upgrade enabled Geely Galaxy OS shared with the Xingyue L. The Geely Galaxy OS runs on eCarX's E02 eight-core system-on-a-chip (SoC) and features an AI-based voice control system with multiple occupant support, three-finger flying screen gesture control, over-the-air firmware updates, smartphone remote control support, and an eight-speaker sound system tuned by DTS.

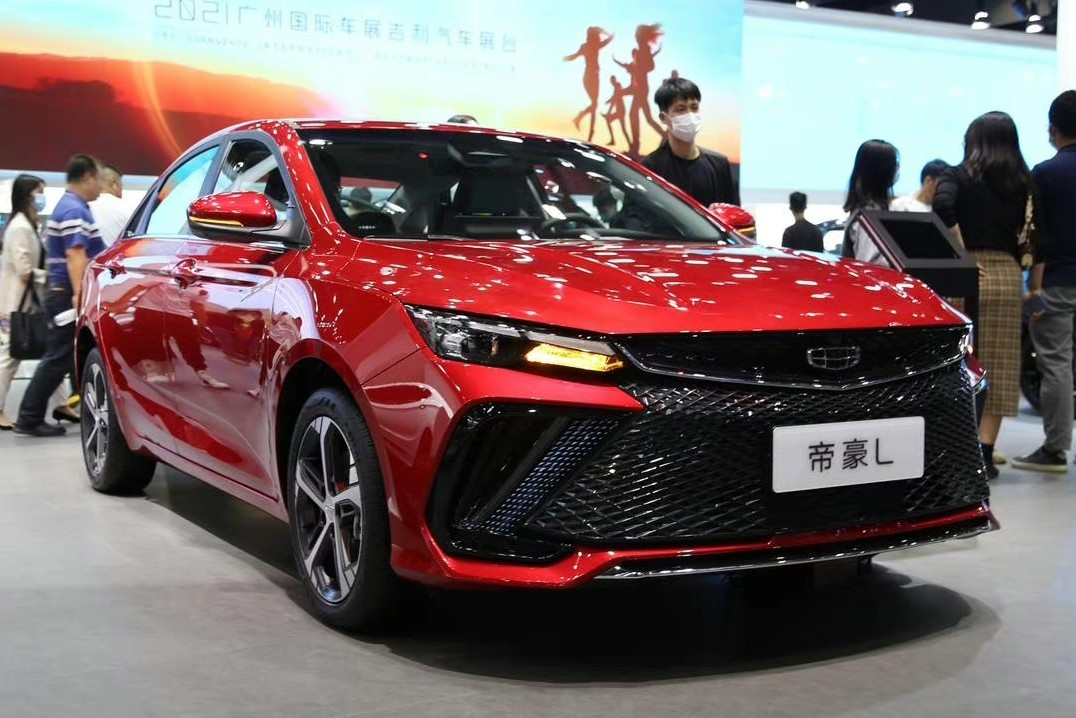
Geely Emgrand L front.

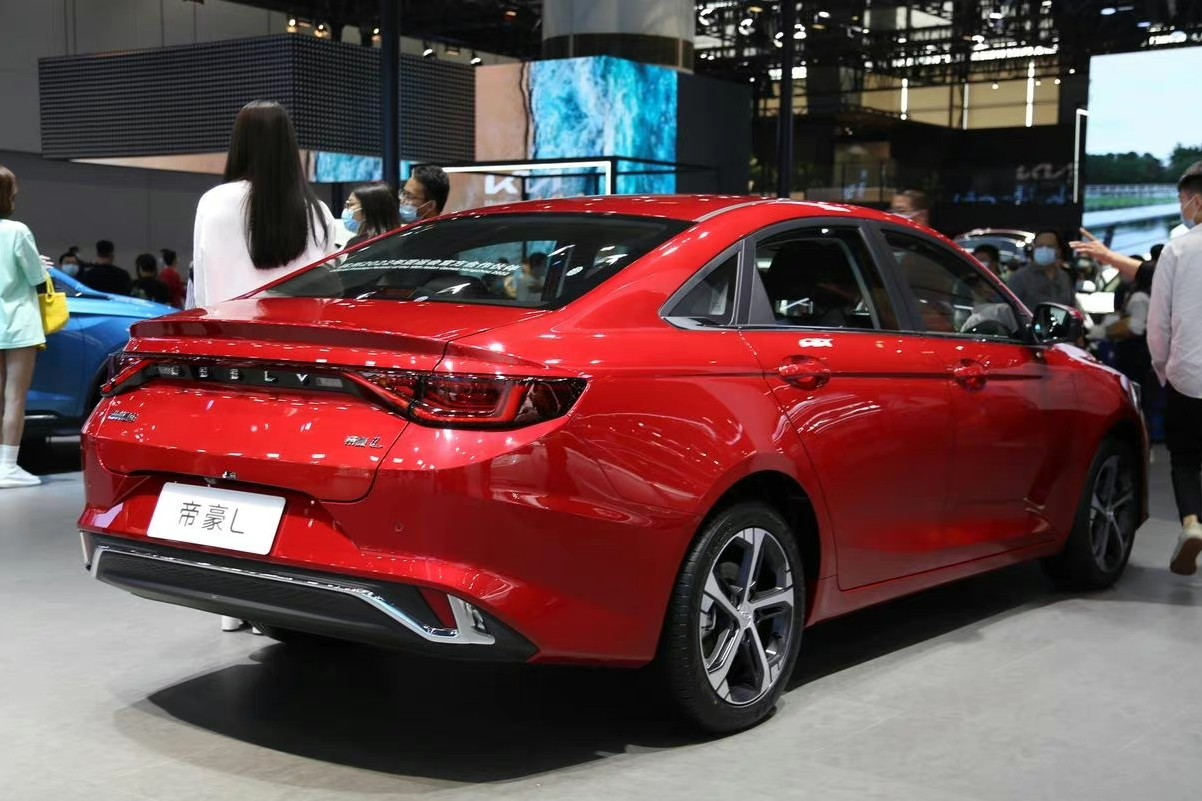
Geely Emgrand L rear.

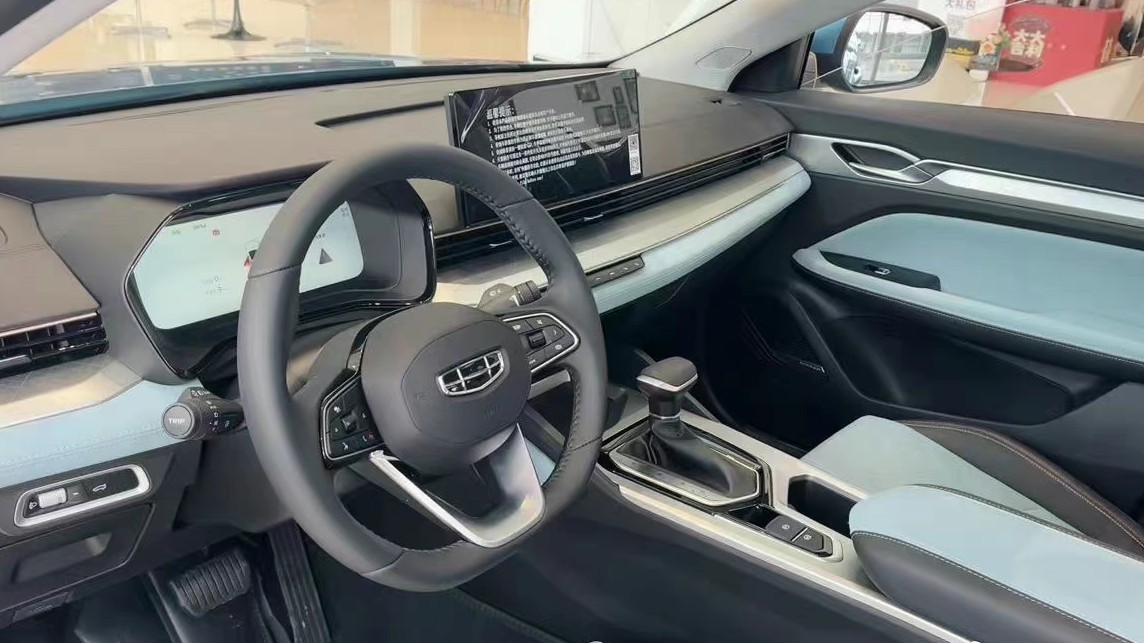
Geely Emgrand L interior.

=== Livan S6 Pro ===
The vehicle is marketed as the Livan S6 Pro in Russia since October 2023, adopting a redesigned front bumper design.

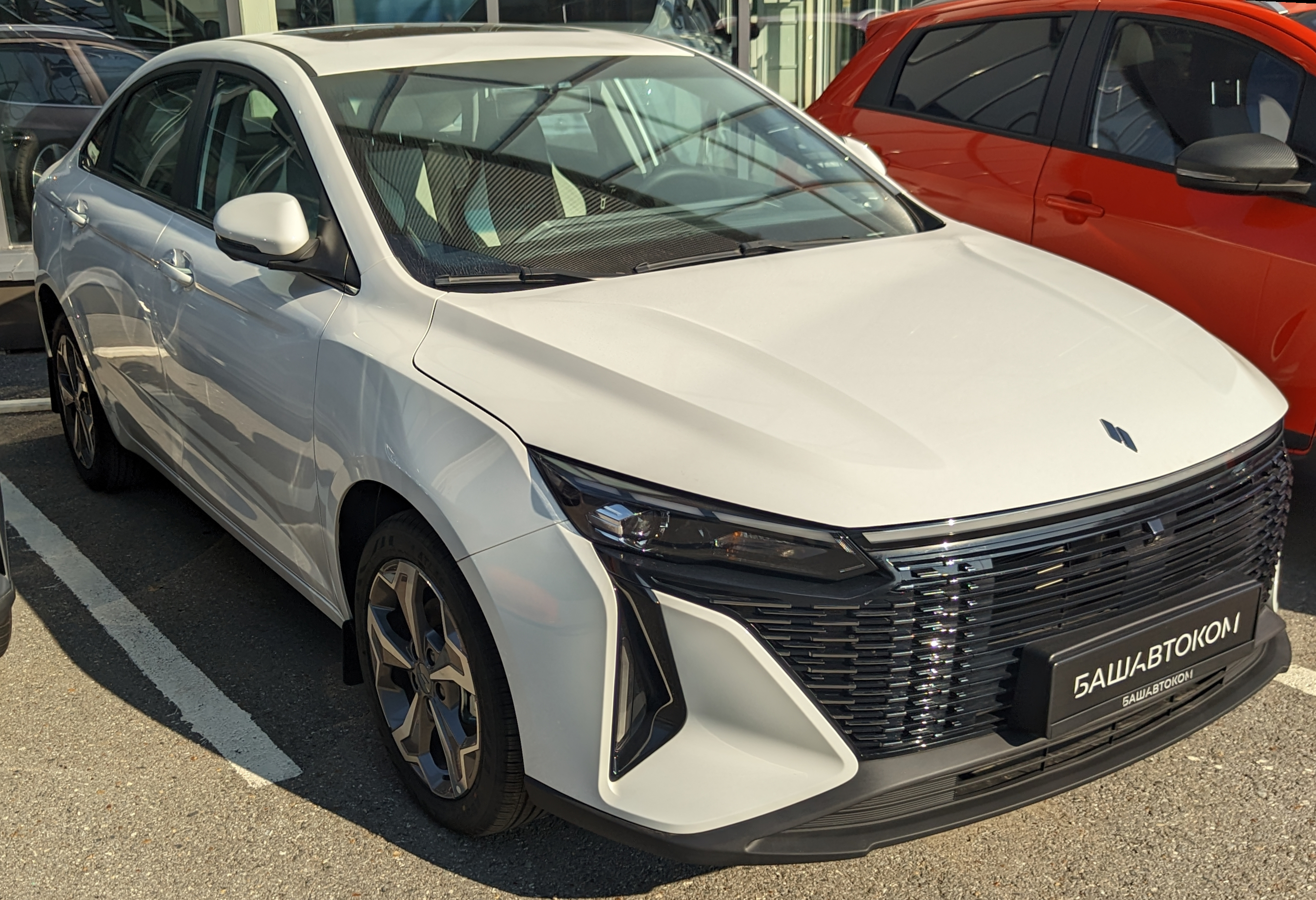
Livan S6 Pro (Russia)

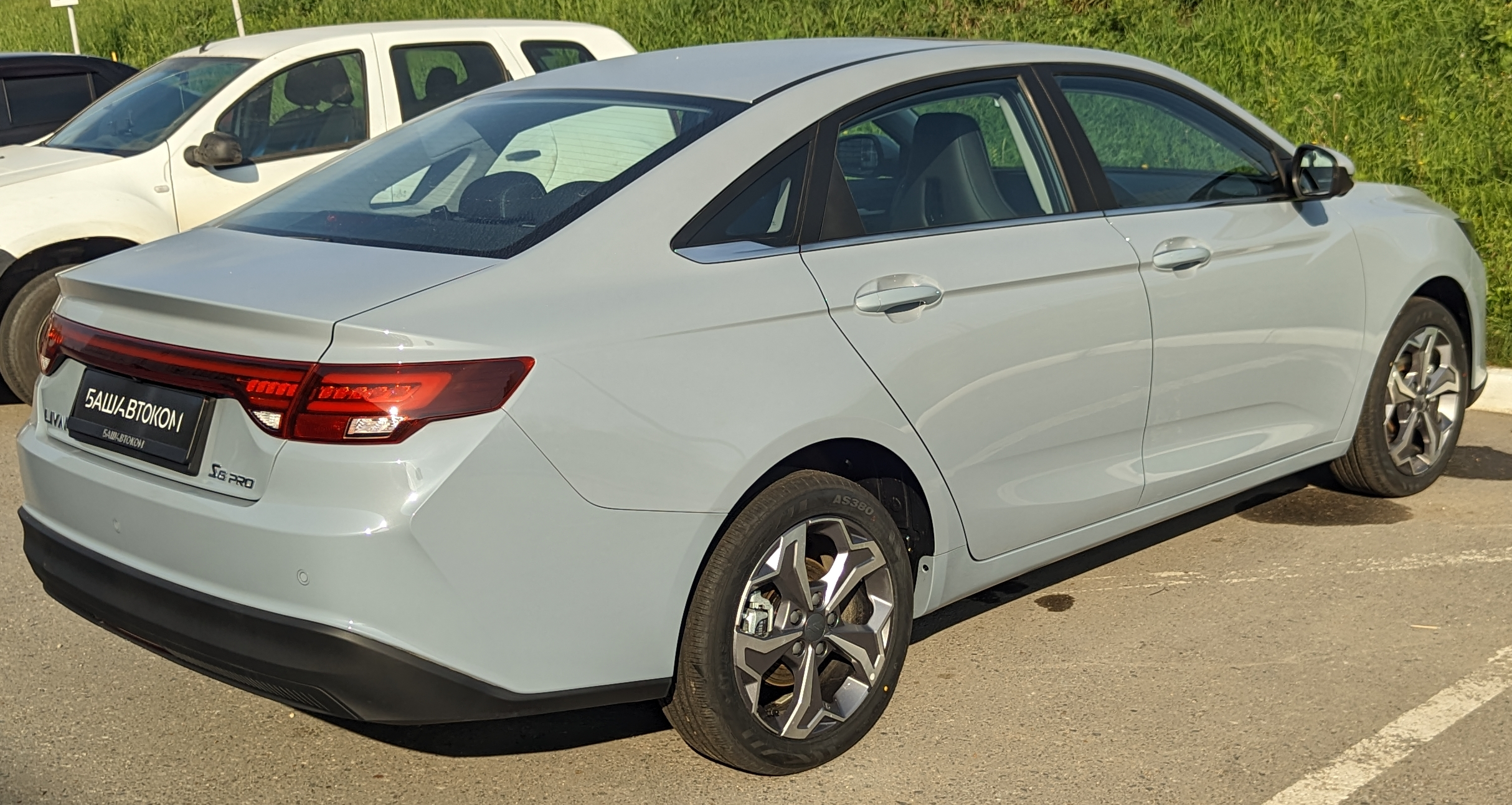
Livan S6 Pro (Russia)

=== Plug-in hybrid ===
==== Emgrand L Hi·X ====
A plug-in hybrid variant called the Emgrand L Hi·X (Emgrand L Leishen Hi·X) was launched in April 2022. The Emgrand L Hi·X is the first vehicle to be equipped with the Leishen intelligent engine system including a 1.5-litre TD engine mated with the 3-speed DHT Pro gearbox. The official maximum range is 1,300 kilometres (810 mi) and 0–100 km/h (0–62 mph) acceleration takes 6.9 seconds. Fuel consumption is 3.8 L/100 km (26.3 km/L; 74.3 mpg_{‑imp}; 61.9 mpg_{‑US}).

==== Emgrand L Hi·P ====
Emgrand L Hi-P hybrid is equipped with a 1.5-litre 4-cylinder BHE15-EFZ petrol engine with 181 hp (135 kW; 184 PS) and 290 N⋅m (214 lb⋅ft; 30 kg⋅m), shared with the Geely Binyue/Coolray. The electric motor produces 136 hp (101 kW; 138 PS) and 320 N⋅m (236 lb⋅ft; 33 kg⋅m), resulting in a combined power output of 317 hp (236 kW; 321 PS) and 610 N⋅m (450 lb⋅ft; 62 kg⋅m). The transmission is a 3-speed DHT gearbox. The combined range with a full tank and battery is 1,300 kilometres (810 mi) with the fuel consumption being 3.8 litres per 100 kilometres (26.3 km/L; 74.3 mpg_{‑imp}; 61.9 mpg_{‑US}).

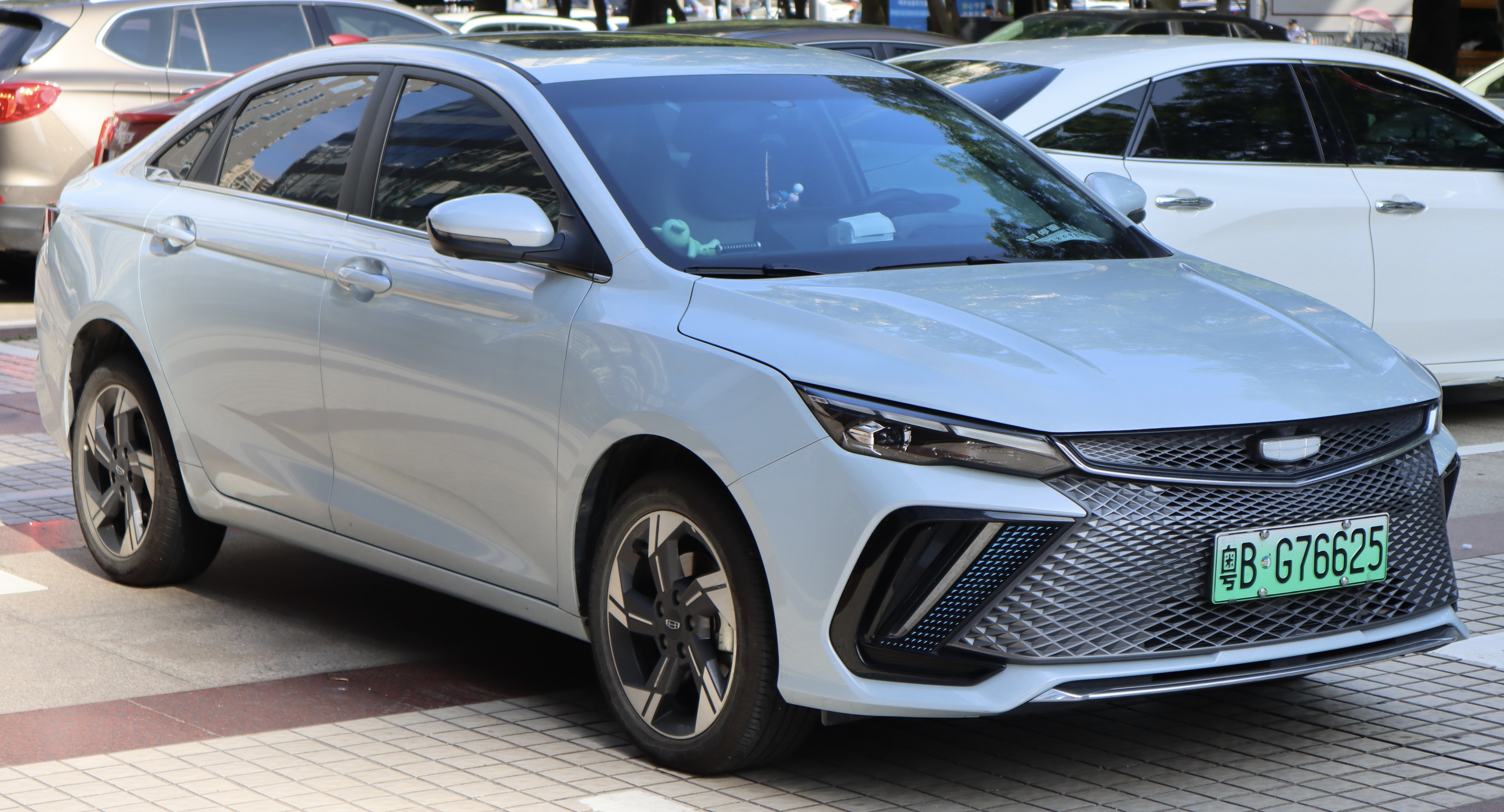
Emgrand L Hi-P

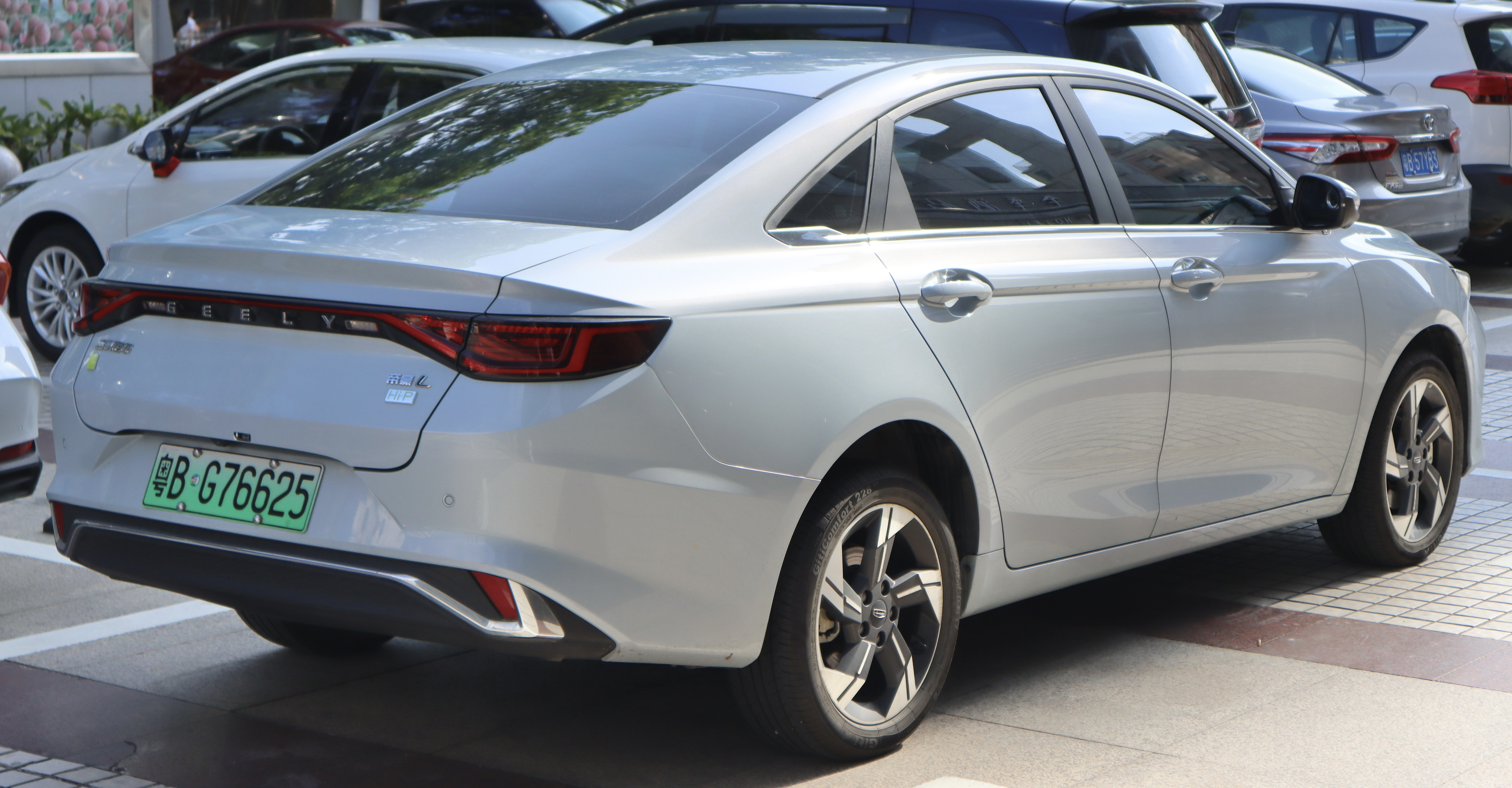
Rear view

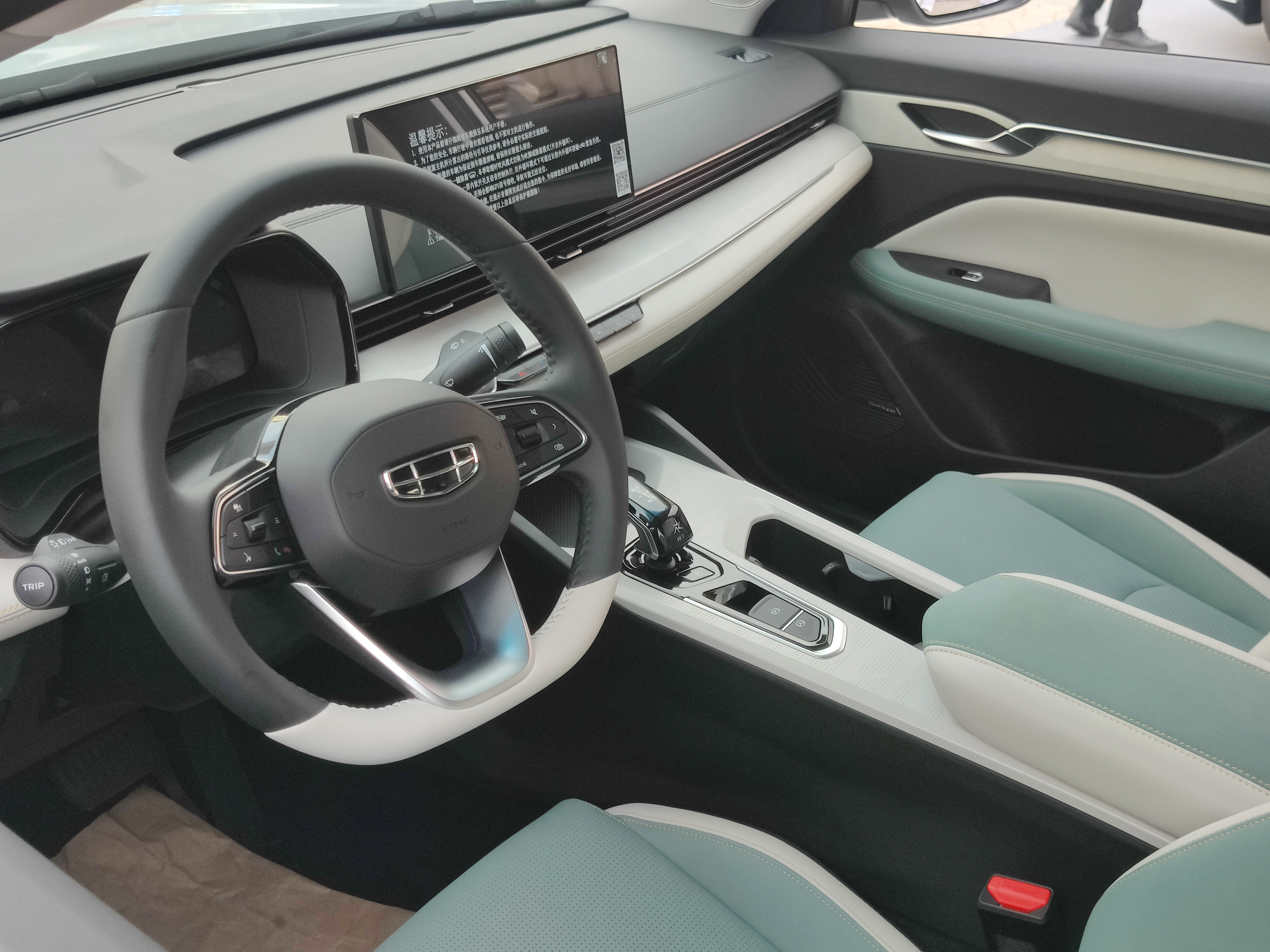
Interior

==== Emgrand L Hi·P 2024 facelift ====
In 2024, Geely launched the facelifted Emgrand L Hi·P marketed as Long Teng Edition.

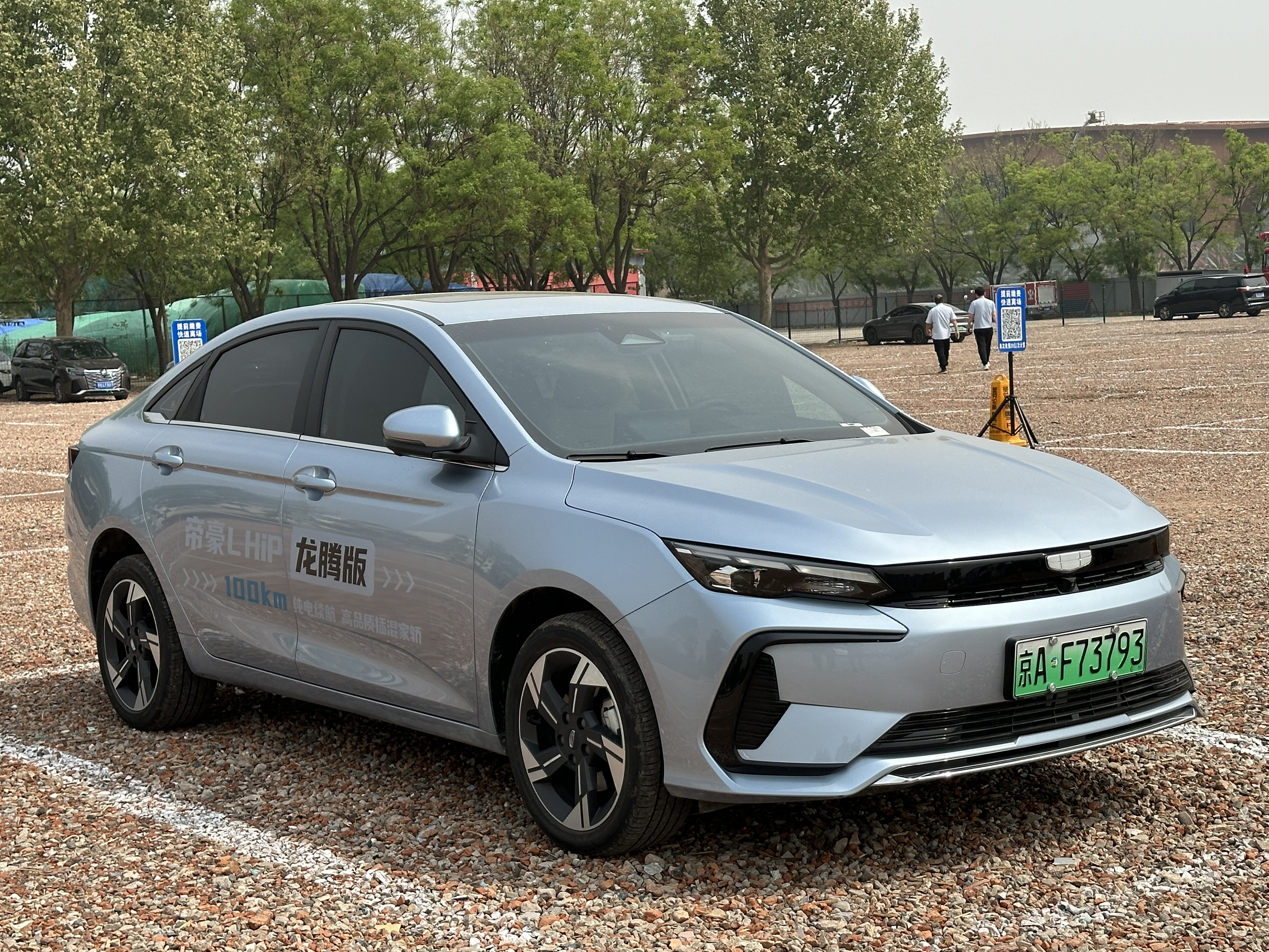
Emgrand L Hi-P (2024 facelift)

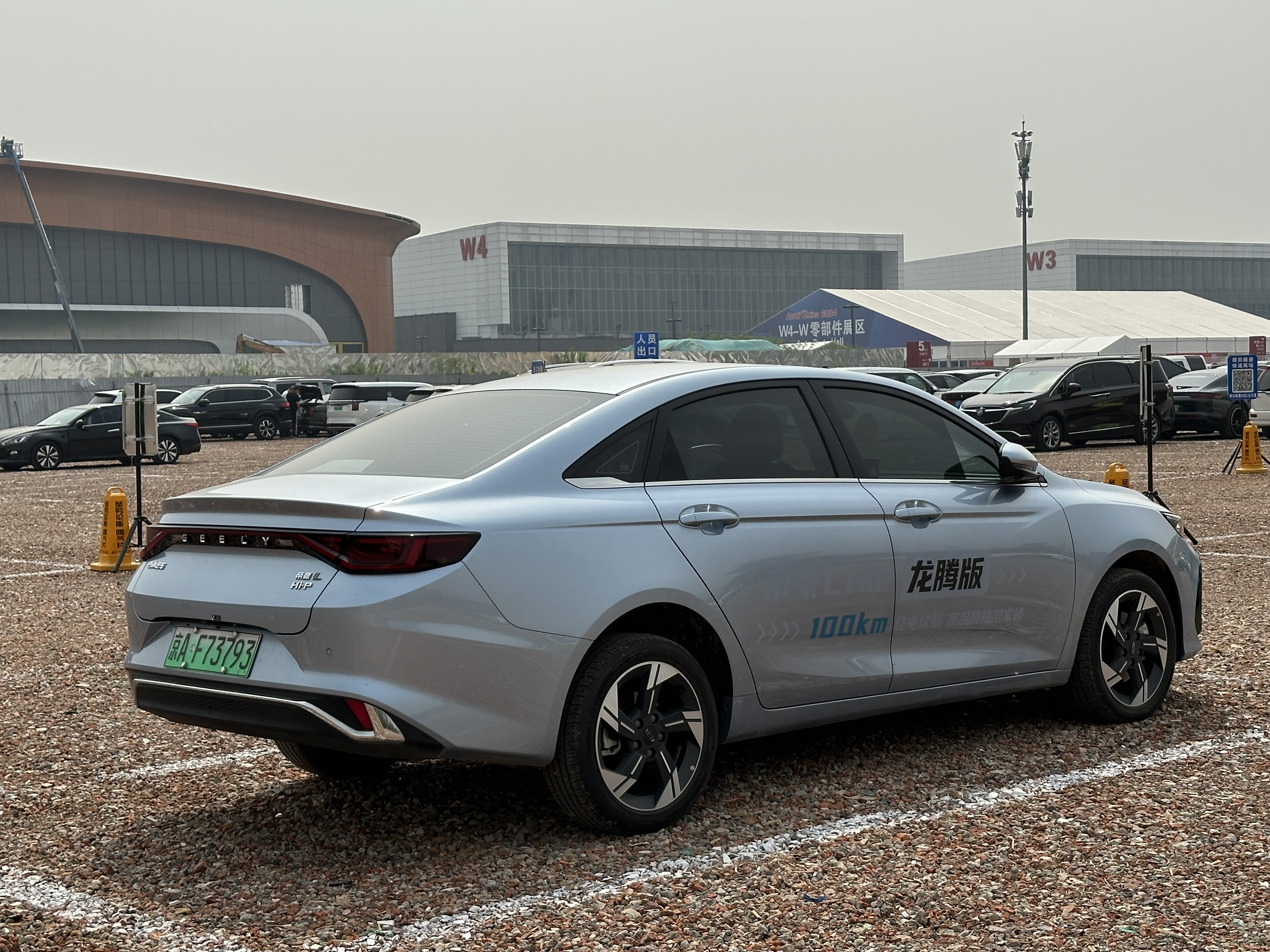
Rear view

== Sales ==
Year	China				
Year	Emgrand GL	Emgrand L	Emgrand EV	Emgrand L Hi-P	Maple 60S
2023	32	1,475	14,112	13,559	7,091
2024	9	14	3,330	5,011	6,459
2025	—	2	241	468	8,120
