= Xinjian Subdistrict, Jinzhong =

Xinjian Subdistrict 新建街道
- Subdistrict
- Location in Shanxi
- Coordinates: 37°41′23″N 112°44′9″E
- Country: People's Republic of China
- Province: Shanxi
- Prefecture-level city: Jinzhong
- District: Yuci District
- Time zone: UTC+8 (China Standard)

Xinjian Subdistrict (Chinese: 新建街道; pinyin: Xīnjiàn Jiēdào) is a subdistrict in Yuci District, Jinzhong, Shanxi province, China. As of 2018, it has 9 residential communities under its administration.

== See also ==
- List of township-level divisions of Shanxi
