= Jingwei Subdistrict, Jinzhong =

Jingwei Subdistrict 经纬街道
- Subdistrict
- Location in Shanxi
- Coordinates: 37°40′39″N 112°41′54″E
- Country: People's Republic of China
- Province: Shanxi
- Prefecture-level city: Jinzhong
- District: Yuci District
- Time zone: UTC+8 (China Standard)

Jingwei Subdistrict (simplified Chinese: 经纬街道; traditional Chinese: 經緯街道; pinyin: Jīngwěi Jiēdào) is a subdistrict in Yuci District, Jinzhong, Shanxi, China. As of 2023, it administers five residential communities.

== See also ==
- List of township-level divisions of Shanxi
