= Wins Finance Holdings =

- Trade name: OTC Pink: WINSF
- Company type: Public
- Industry: Financial services
- Headquarters: Beijing, China
- Area served: Jinzhong, Shanxi
- Products: Loan guarantees; equipment leases; loans
- Website: winsholdings.com

Wins Finance Holdings is a Chinese financial services company engaged in providing loan guarantees, equipment leases, and direct loans to small and medium sized businesses mainly in Jinzhong, Shanxi.

== History ==
The origins of Wins Finance as a publicly listed company start with Sino Mercury Acquisition Corporation (SMAC), which was formed as a special-purpose acquisition company. SMAC had been established and listed on the Nasdaq in 2014. The intention of forming the shell company was to raise money and serve as a backdoor for a Chinese company in the non-traditional financial sector to become listed in the US. The founders of SMAC were Richard Xu and Brad Reifler. The sole book runner on the IPO was Cantor Fitzgerald. SMAC's August 2014 IPO on the Nasdaq would raise $40 million.

Wins Finance was the target Chinese company acquired by SMAC in 2015 with the merged entity taking the name of Wins Finance. It would start trading on the Nasdaq in October 2015. The main subsidiary of Wins Finance is Shanxi Dongsheng Finance Guarantee, which was founded in 2006, but the leasing business started in 2009.

In early 2017, the company's stock generated widespread media interest because it had soared by as much as 4,555% since its Nasdaq listing. At its peak in February 2017, the company had a market capitalization of $9 billion and its largest then shareholder Wang Hong was worth $6 billion. A Bloomberg investigation into the price spike summed it up as "a little-known Chinese stock that went crazy for no apparent reason".

== Corporate affairs ==
Wang Hong was in 2016 the largest shareholder, holding 67% of shares. By the end of the year, Wang Hong entered into an agreement to sell his shares to Hong Kong Stock Exchange listed Freeman FinTech at a 79% discount to the trading price of Wins Financial on the day of the agreement. Wins Financial was in the midst of a meteoric ascent. The deal would be completed in August 2017 with Freeman FinTech paying $260 million for Wang Hong's shares.

Other major shareholders in mid-2016 were Zhao Peilin and Zhao Jing.

=== Connections to Deyu Agriculture ===
Key players in SMAC and Wins Finance also have connections to Deyu Agriculture, a Shanxi based company like Wins Finance, that had also been listed on the Nasdaq in 2010. Deyu Agriculture's US listing had ended with the collapse of the stock price. Jianming Hao served as the chairman and co-chief executive officer Wins Finance and had also been the CEO of Deyu Agriculture. The largest shareholder of Wins Finance, Wang Hong, was also a top shareholder of Deyu Agriculture. Wang Hong was CEO of Deyu Agriculture after Jiaming Hao stepped down as CEO in 2013. Peiling He was both the CFO of Deyu Agriculture and later Wins Finance.

== Business ==
The company provides financial services including loan guarantees, equipment leases, and direct loans to small and medium sized businesses in Shanxi. About 2/3 of its business is in Jinzhong, a 4th tier city economically reliant on coal mining in Shanxi. In the fiscal year ending in June 2017, the company's loan guarantee business fell by half to $2.8 million with a limited client base of only 2 customers accounting for 1/3 of the revenue.
