= Taiyuan Normal University =

University in Taiyuan, China

- 太原师范学院
- Motto: 崇德、博学、团结、创新
- Motto in English: Virtues, Knowledge, Unity, Innovation
- Type: Public
- Established: March 1999
- Affiliations: Department of Education of Shanxi Province
- Principal: LIANG Jiye
- Academic staff: 1,626
- Students: 12,527
- Undergraduates: 11,440
- Location: 189 Nannei Huanjie, Yingze District, Taiyuan, Shanxi, 030012, People's Republic of China; 37°45′00″N 112°42′45″E
- Campus: Urban, 1,233,695 square metres (13,279,380 sq ft)
- Website: www.tynu.edu.cn
- Location within Shanxi Location within China

Taiyuan Normal University (Chinese: 太原师范学院; pinyin: Tàiyuán Shīfàn Xuéyuàn) is a university in Shanxi, China under the authority of the provincial government. Taiyuan Normal University is a teaching University. It provides graduates to fill China's growing need for primary, secondary and tertiary teachers. University has country rank 663 and world rank 9335.

== University campus ==
Taiyuan Normal University has four campuses. Taiyuan Normal University covers a total area of 1,233,695 square meters. The three old campuses in the north, middle and south cover a total area of 361,252 square meters, and the new campus covers an area of 872,443 square meters. The North Campus is located in Houjia Lane (the former site of Shanxi University Hall) in Yingze District, Taiyuan City. The secondary campus is located at No. 189, South Inner Ring Street, Yingze District, Taiyuan City (Dayingpan). The South Campus is located in Huangling, Xiaodian District, Taiyuan City. The new campus is located in the northwest corner of the new university campus in Shanxi Province in the north of Yuci District, Jinzhong City, covering an area of 1569.21 mu, with an investment of 2 billion yuan. In September 2013, the new campus was put into use.

== History ==
Taiyuan Teachers College is located in Taiyuan, the capital of Shanxi Province. The school was founded in March 1999. It was reorganized from the former Teachers College of Shanxi University, Taiyuan Teachers College, and Shanxi Education College. Shanxi University Teachers College was established in 1988 as an undergraduate department of Shanxi University. It was established on the site of the former Chinese People's Liberation Army Naval Electronic Engineering College (Dayingpan, Yingze District, Taiyuan City). Taiyuan Normal College was established in 1958. Its history can be traced back to the Shanxi Provincial Government Normal School founded in 1905. The Government Normal School was renamed several times, and in 1953 it was renamed "Shanxi Provincial Taiyuan First Normal School". In August 1958, Taiyuan No. 1 Normal School merged with Taiyuan Advanced Training School and Taiyuan No. 2 Normal School to establish Taiyuan Teachers College, which was located in Houjia Lane (the former site of Shanxi University Hall) in Taiyuan City. [1] Shanxi Provincial Institute of Education was founded in 1929. The school site was initially located at the former National Normal University site, and later moved to West Lane, Huangling Road, Xiaodian District.

Taiyuan Normal University is an undergraduate normal college. In August 2013, Taiyuan Normal University was officially approved by the Ministry of Education of the People's Republic of China as a master's degree-granting unit, and three first-level disciplines, geography, mathematics, and Chinese language and literature, became master's degree-granting disciplines.

Taiyuan Normal University has a Chinese-foreign joint Sino-Canada Silk College, and the partner is Silk College, a community college in British Columbia, Canada. The predecessor of Sino-Canada Silk College was the "Foreign Language Department of Teachers College of Shanxi University" approved by the Shanxi Provincial People's Government on April 28, 1997. It was the first Sino-foreign joint college in Shanxi Province. On December 3, 2009, the People's Government of Shanxi Province approved the change of the partner to Canada Silk College, and changed the name of "Taiyuan Normal University Foreign Language Department" to "Taiyuan Teachers College Sino-Canadian Silk College". On 7 May 2010, the filing was completed at the Ministry of Education of China.
