= Nanshan Colliery disaster =

2006 explosion in Jinzhong, China

The Nanshan Colliery disaster is a fatal gas explosion that occurred on November 13, 2006 at the Nanshan Colliery in Lingshi County, Jinzhong, Shanxi Province, China. Twenty-four people were killed. The mine was operating without any safety licence as its original had expired. While no official cause has emerged, the news agency Xinhua claims the explosion was triggered by incorrect usage of explosives.

== See also ==
- Coal power in China
- Blind Shaft
