= Xinzhou Teachers University =

University in Shanxi, China

Xinzhou Normal University (Chinese: 忻州师范学院; pinyin: Xīnzhōu shīfàn xuéyuàn) is a university in Shanxi, China under the authority of the provincial government.
