= Yuncheng University =

University in Shanxi, China

Coordinates: 35.03934°N 111.04606°E

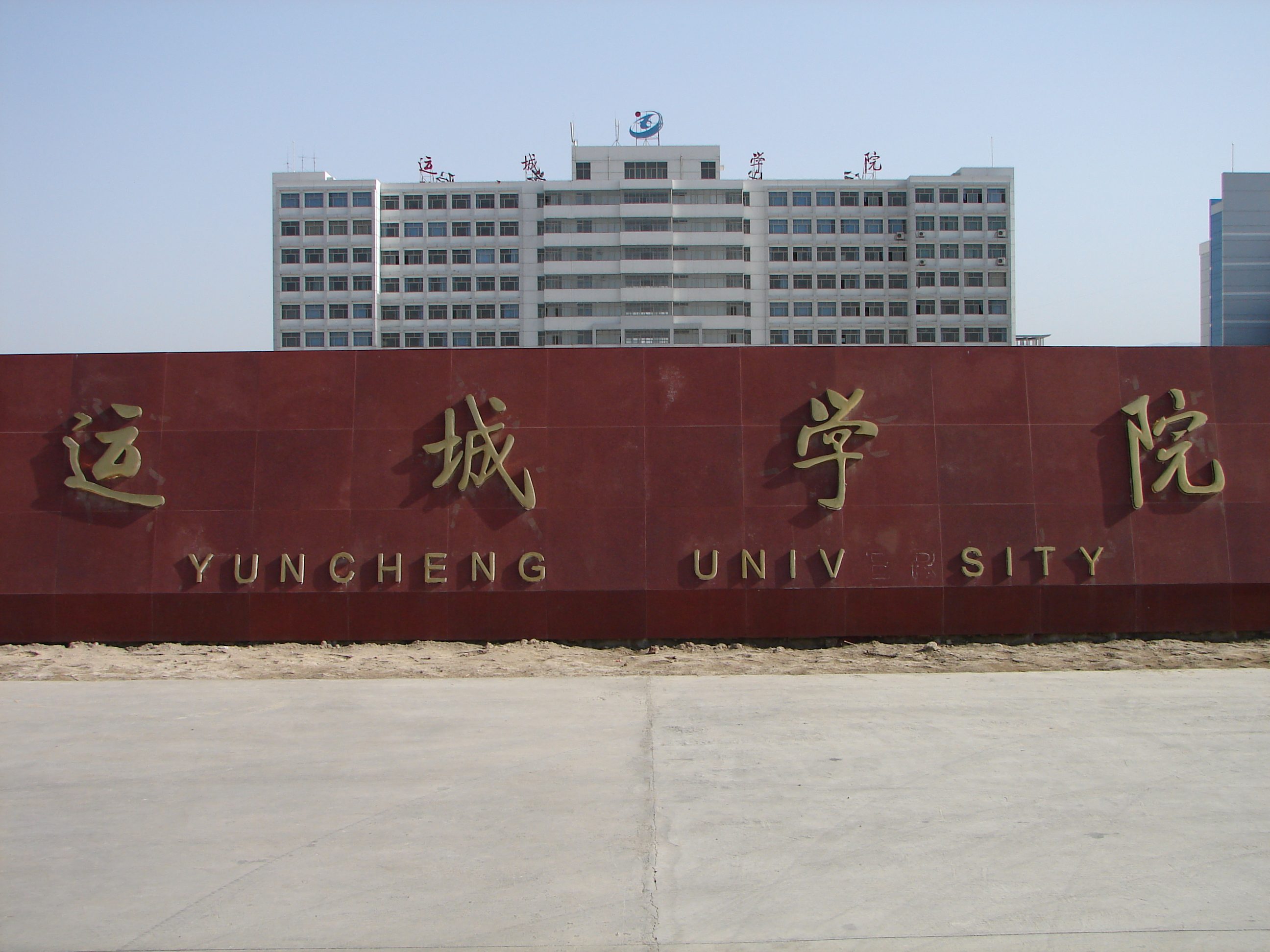
Yuncheng University

Yuncheng University (Chinese: 运城学院) is a university in Shanxi, China under the authority of the provincial government. It was formerly known as Yuncheng Advanced Training College.

Justin Hill spent three years here, 1993–1995, teaching with Voluntary Service Overseas, which was the source for his first book, A Bend in the Yellow River.

== Noted people ==
- Justin Hill — English writer who has written and translated widely about China.
- Anthony Manning, Dean for Global and Lifelong Learning and international education author at the University of Kent
