= Shanxi Medical University =

University in Taiyuan, China

- Type: Public university
- Established: 1919
- President: Duan Zhiguang
- Location: Taiyuan, Shanxi, China
- Website: https://www.sxmu.edu.cn/

Shanxi Medical University (Chinese: 山西医科大学) is a university in Shanxi, People's Republic of China under the authority of the provincial government.

== See also ==
- Shanxi University of Traditional Chinese Medicine
