= Shanxi University of Chinese Medicine =

University in Shanxi, China

- 山西中医药大学
- Former names: Shanxi Medical College of Traditional Chinese Medicine (山西中医学院)
- Type: Public
- Established: 1978; 48 years ago
- President: Zhang Junlong
- Location: Taiyuan, Shanxi, China
- Campus: 1091 acres
- Website: https://www.sxtcm.edu.cn/

Chinese name
- Simplified Chinese: 山西中医药大学
- Traditional Chinese: 山西中醫藥大學
Transcriptions
Standard Mandarin
- Hanyu Pinyin: shānxī zhōng yīyào dàxué

Shaanxi University of Chinese Medicine is a public medical university based in Taiyuan, Shanxi Province, China.

The university has two campuses in Taiyuan and Jinzhong and has four affiliated hospitals which serve as teaching and patient care sites using traditional Chinese medicine.

== History ==
Shanxi University of Traditional Chinese Medicine traces its origins to 1978, when a Traditional Chinese Medicine program was established under Shanxi Medical College (山西医学院中医大学).

In 1986, the program began operating independently, and in 1989, it was officially established as a public university named Shanxi College of Traditional Chinese Medicine (山西中医学院) with the approval of the former State Education Commission. The university was authorized to confer master's degrees in 2000 and began enrolling graduate students in 2001.

In 2017, it was renamed Shanxi University of Chinese Medicine (山西中医药大学) with the approval of the Ministry of Education. In 2024, it was granted the authority to confer doctoral degrees.

Today, it is a key university in Shanxi Province, jointly supported by the provincial government and the National Administration of Traditional Chinese Medicine. It is also one of the first pilot institutions in the Ministry of Education's Excellence in Doctor (TCM) Education and Training Program and serves as a model university for innovation and entrepreneurship education reform in the province.

In 2019, the university and seven other Chinese medical schools were removed from the World Directory of Medical Schools, limiting the scope of practice of its graduates to traditional Chinese medicine.

New university campus

== Teaching institutions ==
- Basic Medical School of Clinical Chinese Medicine
- Acupuncture and Massage College of Traditional Chinese Medicine
- College of Nursing College of Integrative Medicine
- Clinical College of Chinese Medicine School of Management
- Fu Shan Institute of Humanities Institute of Pharmacy and Food Engineering
- School of Continuing Education (Vocational and Technical College)
- Graduate School Center for Education of Ideological and Political Theory
- Teaching and Research Department of Sports
- Management Center Experiment
