= Jinzhong =

Jinzhong 晋中市 Kinchung
- Prefecture-level city
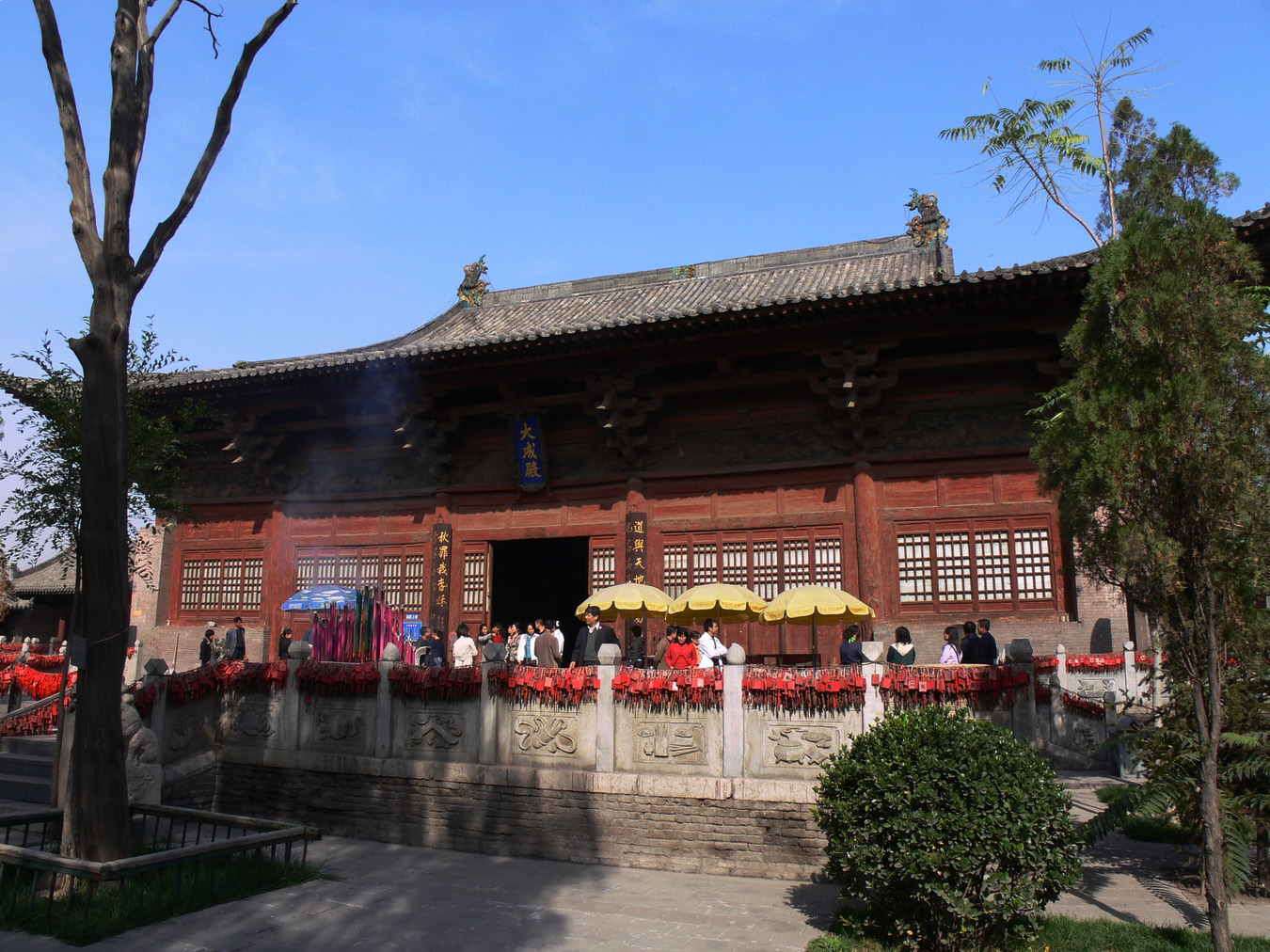
- Hall of Great Accomplishment in the Confucious Temple of Pingyao

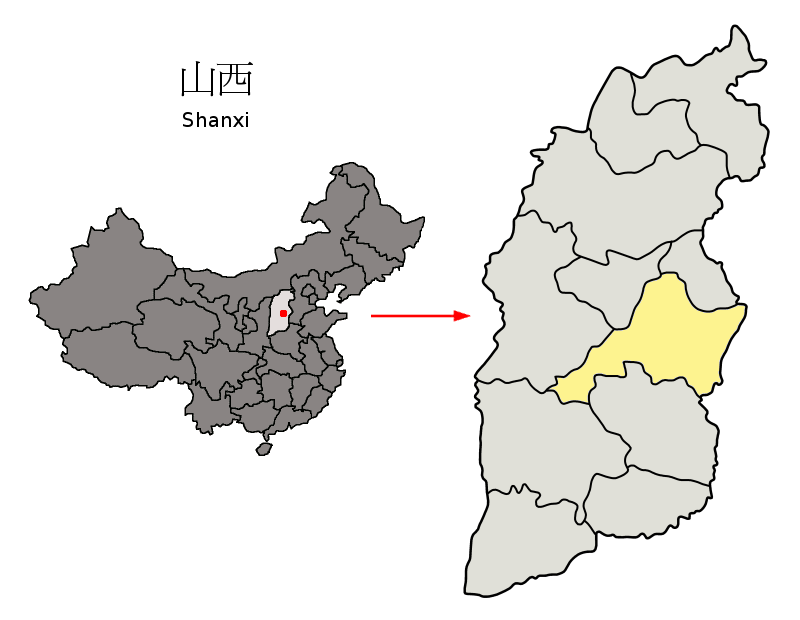
- Location of Jinzhong City jurisdiction in Shanxi

- Location of the city center in Shanxi
- Coordinates (Jinzhong municipal government): 37°41′17″N 112°45′09″E
- Country: People's Republic of China
- Province: Shanxi
- County-level divisions: 11
- Municipal seat: Yuci District

Government
  - Type: Prefecture-level city
  - CPC Jinzhong Secretary: Liu Xing (刘星)
  - Mayor: Feng Xiaolei (冯晓雷)

Area
  - Prefecture-level city: 16,408 km^{2} (6,335 sq mi)
  - Urban: 2,361 km^{2} (912 sq mi)
  - Metro: 2,787 km^{2} (1,076 sq mi)

Population (2020 census)
  - Prefecture-level city: 3,379,498
  - Density: 205.97/km^{2} (533.45/sq mi)
  - Urban: 1,226,617
  - Urban density: 519.5/km^{2} (1,346/sq mi)
  - Metro: 5,433,659
  - Metro density: 1,950/km^{2} (5,050/sq mi)

GDP (2025)
  - Prefecture-level city: CN¥ 246.26 billion
  - Per capita: CN¥ 74,252; US$ 10,395
- Time zone: UTC+8 (China Standard)
- Postal code: 030600
- Area code: 0354
- ISO 3166 code: CN-SX-07
- Licence plates: 晋K
- Administrative division code: 140700
- Website: sxjz.gov.cn

Jinzhong
- Traditional Chinese: 晉中
- Simplified Chinese: 晋中
- Literal meaning: Central Jin
Transcriptions
Standard Mandarin
- Hanyu Pinyin: Jìnzhōng
- Wade–Giles: Chin-chung

Yuci
- Chinese: 榆次
- Literal meaning: Elm Place
Transcriptions
Standard Mandarin
- Hanyu Pinyin: Yúcì
- Wade–Giles: Yu-tz‘u

Jinzhong, formerly Yuci, is a prefecture-level city in east central Shanxi province of the People's Republic of China, bordering Hebei province to the east. As of the 2020 census, its total population was 3,379,498 inhabitants of whom 1,226,617 lived in the Yuci and Taigu urban districts. However, 5,433,659 lived in the built-up (or metro) area of Taiyuan - Jinzhong made of Yuci district plus the 6 Taiyuan urban/built-up districts, largely conurbated.

== History ==
Lingshi County was the location of the Nanshan Colliery disaster.

In 1999, the area was considered sufficiently urbanized that Jinzhong Prefecture became a prefecture-level city, with its former seat at Yuci becoming its county-level Yuci District.

== Administrative divisions ==
Jinzhong is divided into the following county-level subdivisions:

Map
Name	Hanzi	Hanyu Pinyin	Population (2003 est.)	Area (km^{2})	Density (/km^{2})
Yuci District	榆次区	Yúcì Qū	530,000	1,327	399
Taigu District	太谷区	Tàigǔ Qū	280,000	1,034	271
Jiexiu City	介休市	Jièxiū Shì	380,000	743	511
Yushe County	榆社县	Yúshè Xiàn	140,000	1,651	85
Zuoquan County	左权县	Zuǒquán Xiàn	160,000	2,028	79
Heshun County	和顺县	Héshùn Xiàn	140,000	2,251	62
Xiyang County	昔阳县	Xīyáng Xiàn	230,000	1,943	118
Shouyang County	寿阳县	Shòuyáng Xiàn	210,000	2,111	99
Qi County	祁县	Qí Xiàn	260,000	854	304
Pingyao County	平遥县	Píngyáo Xiàn	490,000	1,260	389
Lingshi County	灵石县	Língshí Xiàn	240,000	1,206	199

== Climate ==
Jinzhong has a continental, monsoon-influenced semi-arid climate (Köppen BSk), with cold and very dry winters, and hot, humid summers. The monthly 24-hour average temperature ranges from −5.5 °C (22.1 °F) in January to 24.2 °C (75.6 °F) in July, and the annual mean is 10.39 °C (50.7 °F). Typifying the influence of the East Asian Monsoon, over two-thirds of the annual 388 millimetres (15.3 in) of precipitation occurs from June to September.

Climate data for Jinzhong (Yuci District), 1981–2010
Month	Jan	Feb	Mar	Apr	May	Jun	Jul	Aug	Sep	Oct	Nov	Dec	Year
Record high °C (°F)	12.4 (54.3)	19.3 (66.7)	28.2 (82.8)	37.1 (98.8)	35.6 (96.1)	39.6 (103.3)	39.5 (103.1)	36.3 (97.3)	35.8 (96.4)	28.5 (83.3)	23.6 (74.5)	16.0 (60.8)	39.6 (103.3)
Mean daily maximum °C (°F)	1.9 (35.4)	5.8 (42.4)	11.9 (53.4)	20.0 (68.0)	25.6 (78.1)	29.3 (84.7)	30.4 (86.7)	28.5 (83.3)	24.1 (75.4)	17.9 (64.2)	9.7 (49.5)	3.2 (37.8)	17.4 (63.2)
Daily mean °C (°F)	−5.5 (22.1)	−1.5 (29.3)	4.6 (40.3)	12.6 (54.7)	18.5 (65.3)	22.4 (72.3)	24.2 (75.6)	22.4 (72.3)	17.3 (63.1)	10.7 (51.3)	2.7 (36.9)	−3.7 (25.3)	10.4 (50.7)
Mean daily minimum °C (°F)	−11.2 (11.8)	−7.4 (18.7)	−1.6 (29.1)	5.4 (41.7)	11.4 (52.5)	15.9 (60.6)	18.9 (66.0)	17.4 (63.3)	11.8 (53.2)	4.9 (40.8)	−2.7 (27.1)	−8.9 (16.0)	4.5 (40.1)
Record low °C (°F)	−21.0 (−5.8)	−20.6 (−5.1)	−15.7 (3.7)	−7.0 (19.4)	0.3 (32.5)	7.1 (44.8)	11.6 (52.9)	9.2 (48.6)	−0.2 (31.6)	−6.9 (19.6)	−18.2 (−0.8)	−22.3 (−8.1)	−22.3 (−8.1)
Average precipitation mm (inches)	2.0 (0.08)	3.3 (0.13)	9.9 (0.39)	21.0 (0.83)	37.2 (1.46)	52.2 (2.06)	81.9 (3.22)	87.8 (3.46)	54.0 (2.13)	27.0 (1.06)	9.9 (0.39)	1.7 (0.07)	387.9 (15.28)
Average relative humidity (%)	47	45	44	42	48	56	67	71	69	62	55	50	55
Source: China Meteorological Administration

== Transportation ==
- Taiyuan–Jiaozuo Railway

== Culture ==
The prefecture-level city houses several Shanxi Courtyard Houses, businessmen's residences lauded as outstanding ancient civilian residences.

Yuci District is increasingly connected to nearby Taiyuan, capital of the Shanxi province, whose built-up area was home to 3,848,151 people in 2010.

== Demographics ==
According to the Seventh National Census in 2020, the city’s Permanent Population (hukou) was 3,379,498, with males accounting for 50.89% and females for 49.11%. In the age structure, 16.42% are aged 0–14, 64.62% are aged 15–59, 18.96% are over 60, and 12.99% are over 65.

== Sister Cities ==
- Jinhua, Zhejiang
- Szolnok, Hungary
- Quảng Nam Province, Vietnam
- Vals, Austria
- Provins, Île-de-France, France
- Luang Prabang, Laos
