= Officials implicated by the anti-corruption campaign in China (2012–2017) =

Over one hundred officials of provincial-ministerial level and above have been implicated by the anti-corruption campaign in China, which began after the 18th National Congress of the Chinese Communist Party in 2012. The number of officials implicated below the provincial level are much higher. The tables on this list includes only officials for which a case has been initiated by the Central Commission for Discipline Inspection of the Chinese Communist Party (CCP).

== National leaders ==
Linked to Zhou Yongkang case Military official

Name	Investigation announced	Position(s) held (Note: These are positions held at the time the investigation was initiated by the Central Commission for Discipline Inspection; relevant former posts are indicated as such.)	Rank	Summary of offenses cited	Outcome
Bo Xilai 薄熙来	June 13, 2013	Former Party Secretary of Chongqing; Former Minister of Commerce; Former member of the Politburo	Sub-national	Corruption, bribery and murder	Removed from all posts, expelled from the party, sentenced to life in prison
Zhou Yongkang 周永康	July 29, 2014	Former Secretary of the Central Political and Legal Affairs Commission; Former Minister of Public Security of China; Former member of the Politburo Standing Committee	National	Convicted of abuse of power, bribery, leaking state secrets; further accused of loss of state assets, unduly aiding interests of family, friends, and mistresses; adultery with illicit sexual transactions	Expelled from the party, sentenced to life in prison
Guo Boxiong 郭伯雄	April 9, 2015	Former Vice Chairman of the Central Military Commission; Former member of the Politburo	General; Sub-national	Accepting massive bribes in exchange for promotions of officers	Expelled from the party, stripped of General rank, sentenced to life in prison
Xu Caihou 徐才厚	March 15, 2014	Former Vice Chairman of the Central Military Commission; Former member of the Politburo	General; Sub-national	Accepting massive bribes personally and through family, showing undue favoritism in officer promotion process	Expelled from the party and the military, stripped of General rank, was due for court-martial but died before trial
Ling Jihua 令计划	December 22, 2014	Head of the United Front Work Department; Vice Chairman of the Chinese People's Political Consultative Conference; Member of the Politburo; Former Director of the General Office of the Chinese Communist Party	Sub-national	Violating "political rules", aiding business interests of wife, adultery, convicted on charges of bribery, abuse of power, and illegally obtaining state and party secrets	Removed from all posts, expelled from the party, sentenced to life in prison
Su Rong 苏荣	June 14, 2014	Vice Chairman of the Chinese People's Political Consultative Conference; Former Party Secretary of Jiangxi; Former Party Secretary of Gansu; Former Party Secretary of Qinghai	Sub-national	Abuse of power, upstaging decisions made by consensus, selling offices for cash, leading responsibility for corrupt behavior of subordinates; Convicted on charges of abuse of power, amassing wealth of unclear origin, and taking bribes worth 116 million yuan (~$17 million)	Removed from all posts, expelled from the party, sentenced to life in prison
Sun Zhengcai 孙政才	July 24, 2017	Party Secretary of Chongqing; Member of the Politburo	Sub-national	Wavered on belief system, betrayed party principles, became ostentatious and privileged, sought benefits for his relatives' businesses and accepted valuable gifts, engaged in power-for-sex transactions, became lazy and bureaucratic, abuse of power, leaked organizational secrets	Removed from all posts, expelled from the party, sentenced to life in prison
"National leaders" refer to "leaders of the party and state" (Chinese: 党和国家领导人).

== Former and sitting Central Committee members ==
Linked to Zhou Yongkang case Military official

Name	Investigation announced	Position(s) held	Rank	Summary of offenses cited	Outcome
Liu Zhijun 刘志军	July 19, 2013	Former Minister of Railways of the People's Republic of China; Former Member of the Central Committee	Minister	Convicted on charges of abuse of power and accepting bribes	Removed from all posts, expelled from the party, sentenced to death sentence with two-year reprieve without commutation or parole
Li Dongsheng 李东生	December 20, 2013	Vice Minister of Public Security; Member of the Central Committee; Former chief of the 610 Office	Minister	Abuse of power, soliciting bribes, unduly assisting others in obtaining advertising rights, processing policing cases, and obtaining hukou documentation; convicted of taking bribes equivalent of 21.98 million yuan (~$3.11 million)	Removed from all posts, expelled from the party, sentenced to 15 years in prison
Jiang Jiemin 蒋洁敏	September 1, 2013	Director of the State-owned Assets Supervision and Administration Commission; Member of the Central Committee; Former Chairman of the China National Petroleum Corporation	Minister	Convicted of abuse of power, taking bribes of 14.03 million yuan (~$2.21 million), and amassing wealth of unclear origin	Removed from all posts, expelled from the party, sentenced to 16 years in prison
Yang Jinshan 杨金山	October 24, 2014	Deputy Commanding Officer of the Chengdu Military Region; Member of the Central Committee; Former Commander of the Tibet Military District	General	Convicted of abuse of power	Removed from all posts, expelled from the party
Bai Enpei 白恩培	August 29, 2014	Former Party Secretary of Yunnan; Former Member of the Central Committee	Provincial	Convicted on charges of abuse of power and accepting bribes worth some of 246.7 million yuan (~$41.12 million)	Removed from all posts, expelled from the party, sentenced to death sentence with two-year reprieve without commutation or parole
Zhu Mingguo 朱明国	November 28, 2014	Chairman of the Guangdong Provincial People's Political Consultative Conference; Former Deputy Party Secretary of Guangdong; Alternate Member of the Central Committee	Provincial	Abuse of power, accepting bribes, violating one-child policy, did not retreat from his actions even after the 18th Party Congress	Removed from all posts, expelled from the party, sentenced to death sentence with two-year reprieve
Zhou Benshun 周本顺	July 24, 2015	Party Secretary of Hebei; Member of the Central Committee	Provincial	Violating political rules and political discipline, voicing opinions contrary to the party center on "major matters", obstructing investigation, engaging in "non-organizational activities", using public funds to host receptions and meals, frequenting private clubs, failure to control family members from using his position for personal gain, privately holding and leaking state secrets, did not retreat from his actions even after the 18th Party Congress; convicted on charges of accepting bribes of 40.01 million yuan (~$5.72 million)	Removed from all posts, expelled from the party, sentenced to 15 years in prison
Yang Dongliang 杨栋梁	August 18, 2015	Director of the State Administration of Work Safety	Provincial	Taking part in non-organizational activities, attempting to influence the work placement and promotion of his son, illegally occupying public property, changing his itinerary while on foreign trips, wasting public funds, taking part in very expensive entertainment activities, taken gifts and cash, did not retreat from his actions even after the 18th Party Congress	Removed from all posts, expelled from the party, sentenced to 15 years in prison
Sun Huaishan 孙怀山	March 2, 2017	Director of Hong Kong, Macao and Taiwan Affairs Committee of the National Committee of the Chinese People's Political Consultative Conference	Provincial	Violating the Eight-point Regulation, bribery, factionalism, made groundless criticisms of the Party's key policies	Removed from all posts, expelled from the party, sentenced to 14 years in prison
Su Shulin 苏树林	October 7, 2015	Governor of Fujian; Member of the Central Committee	Provincial	Violating the Eight-point Regulation, bribery, abuse of power	Removed from all posts, expelled from the party, sentenced to 16 years in prison
Wang Bao'an 王保安	January 26, 2016	Director of the National Bureau of Statistics	Minister	Bribery Wang was sentenced to life in prison for taking bribes worth 153 million yuan on May 31, 2017.	Removed from all posts, expelled from the party, sentenced to life imprisonment
Wang Min 王珉	March 4, 2016	Deputy Chair of the National People's Congress Education, Science, Culture and Public Health Committee; Former Party Secretary of Liaoning and Jilin Provinces; Member of the Central Committee	Provincial	Violating political rules and political discipline, leading responsibility for negligence during provincial vote-buying scandal, undermining and violating the Eight-point Regulation, using public funds to wine and dine, did not retreat from his actions even after the 18th Party Congress; convicted on charges of dereliction of duty, abuse of power and taking bribes worth 146 million yuan (~$20.85 million)	Removed from all posts, expelled from the party, sentenced to life in prison
Huang Xingguo 黄兴国	September 10, 2016	Acting Party Secretary of Tianjin; Mayor of Tianjin	Provincial	Bribery, undermining the party unity, engaging in superstitious activities, made groundless criticisms of the Party's key policies, obstructed the investigation into his own wrongdoing, improperly assisted associates in the promotion process, let his son take advantage of his position to seek economic benefit.	Removed from all posts, expelled from the party, sentenced to 12 years in prison
Li Liguo 李立国	January 9, 2017	Minister of Civil Affairs	Minister	Failing to impose strict party discipline at the ministry and allowing "systematic corruption" to happen under his watch	Demoted to Deputy-Bureau-Director level (futingjuji)
Xiang Junbo 项俊波	April 9, 2017	Chairman of China Insurance Regulatory Commission	Provincial	Bribery, abuse of power, engaging in superstitious activities, engaged in power-for-sex transactions, violating the Eight-point Regulation	Removed from all posts, expelled from the party
Wang Sanyun 王三运	July 11, 2017	Party Secretary of Gansu; Vice chair of the National People's Congress Education, Science, Culture and Public Health Committee	Provincial	Accepted bribes, long took part in "superstitious activities", frequented private clubs, accused of allowing certain officials to pick official posts and regardless of their problems, responded passively and perfunctorily to major decisions by the CCP Central Committee, committed dereliction of duty, lost his political stance, made groundless criticisms of the Party's key policies, did not retreat from his actions even after the 18th Party Congress	Removed from all posts, expelled from the party, sentenced to 12 years in prison
Yang Huanning 杨焕宁	July 31, 2017	Director of State Administration of Work Safety	Minister	Violating political discipline, departing from party consciousness on "major matters of principle"	Placed on two-year probation within the Party, demoted to Sub-Bureau-Director level (fujuji)
Li Chuncheng 李春城	December 6, 2012	Deputy Party Secretary of Sichuan; Alternate Member of the Central Committee	Sub-provincial	Accepting bribes personally and through his family, furthering business interests of brother, engaging in "superstitious activities", wasting government resources; convicted of abuse of power and taking bribes of over 39.79 million yuan (~$6.27 million)	Removed from all posts, expelled from the party, sentenced to 13 years in prison.
Chen Chuanping 陈川平	August 23, 2014	Party Secretary of Taiyuan; Alternate Member of the Central Committee; Shanxi Provincial Standing Committee	Sub-provincial	Taking bribes personally and through family, abuse of power to obtain benefits for friends and family; abuse of power in promotion for subordinates; caused loss of state assets.	Removed from all posts, expelled from the party, sentenced to 6 years and 6 months in prison
Mo Jiancheng 莫建成	August 27, 2017	Head of the Chinese Communist Party (CCP) committee of the Ministry of Finance	Sub-provincial	Bribery, violating the Eight-point Regulation, did not retreat from his actions even after the 18th Party Congress	Removed from all posts, expelled from the party, sentenced to 14 years in prison
Pan Yiyang 潘逸阳	September 17, 2014	Executive Vice Chairman of Inner Mongolia; Alternate Member of the Central Committee; Former Party Secretary of Ganzhou	Sub-provincial	Sending bribes, accepting bribes, did not retreat from his actions even after the 18th Party Congress	Removed from all posts, expelled from the party, sentenced to 20 years in prison
Wang Min 王敏	December 18, 2014	Party Secretary of Jinan	Sub-provincial	Accepting bribes, did not retreat from his actions even after the 18th Party Congress	Removed from all posts, expelled from the party, sentenced to 12 years in prison
Qiu He 仇和	March 15, 2015	Deputy Party Secretary of Yunnan; Former Party Secretary of Kunming; Alternate Member of the Central Committee	Sub-provincial	Taking bribes in exchange for promotions, abuse of power to aid in business interests of relatives and associates, did not retreat from his actions even after the 18th Party Congress	Removed from all posts, expelled from the party, sentenced to 14 years and 6 months in prison
Wang Yongchun 王永春	August 26, 2013	Former Vice-president of the PetroChina	Sub-provincial	Abuse of power, solicited and received massive bribes	Removed from all posts, expelled from the party, sentenced to 20 years in prison
Wan Qingliang 万庆良	June 27, 2014	Party Secretary of Guangzhou; Alternate Member of the Central Committee; Guangdong Provincial Standing Committee	Sub-provincial	Abuse of power, soliciting and accepting bribes, membership in private clubs	Removed from all posts, expelled from the party, sentenced to life in prison
Yang Weize 杨卫泽	January 4, 2015	Party Secretary of Nanjing; Alternate Member of the Central Committee; Jiangsu Provincial Standing Committee	Sub-provincial	Bribery, abuse of power, frequenting high-end hotels and clubs, did not retreat from his actions even after the 18th Party Congress	Removed from all posts, expelled from the party, sentenced to 12 years and 6 months
Yu Yuanhui 余远辉	May 22, 2015	Party Secretary of Nanning; Alternate Member of the Central Committee; Guangxi A.R. Standing Committee	Sub-provincial	Violating "political rules", Publishing opinions contrary to party line, nepotism, accepting bribes, using official vehicle for private reasons, did not retreat from his actions even after the 18th Party Congress	Removed from all posts, expelled from the party, sentenced to 11 years in prison
Lü Xiwen 吕锡文	November 11, 2015	Deputy Party Secretary of Beijing; Alternate member of the Central Committee	Sub-provincial	Interfering with the market economy, made groundless criticisms of the Party's key policies, interfering with law enforcement, taking cash gifts, factionalism, membership in private clubs, lived a life of luxury and pleasure seeking, did not retreat from her actions even after the 18th Party Congress	Removed from all posts, expelled from the party, sentenced to 13 years in prison
Li Yunfeng 李云峰	May 30, 2016	Vice-governor of Jiangsu	Sub-provincial	Bribery, membership in private clubs	Removed from all posts, expelled from the party, sentenced to 12 years in prison
Tian Xiusi 田修思	July 9, 2016	Former Political Commissar of the People's Liberation Army Air Force	General	Bribing higher-ranking military officials	Expelled from the party, facing court-martial
Yang Chongyong 杨崇勇	April 11, 2017	Vice-chairman of the Hebei People's Congress	Sub-provincial	Violated political discipline, concealed personal marriage changes, used fake ID and bribery	Removed from all posts, expelled from the party, sentenced to life in prison
Zhang Yang 张阳	August 28, 2017	Director of the Political Work Department of the Central Military Commission	General	Bribery, amassing wealth of unclear origin	Committed suicide, expelled from the party
Wu Aiying 吴爱英	October 11, 2017	Minister of Justice	Minister	Fraud	Demoted to Sub-Department-Director level (futingji), expelled from the party
Note: Provincial-level party chiefs, governors, and Congress and Consultative Conference Chairs are of equal administrative rank as a minister of the state; similarly, vice-ministers have the same rank as sub-provincial level officials; Central Committee membership, does not, in and of itself, carry an administrative rank.

== Provincial-ministerial level ==
Linked to Zhou Yongkang case Military official

Name	Investigation announced	Position(s) held	Rank	Summary of offenses cited	Outcome
Ai Baojun 艾宝俊	November 10, 2015	Vice Mayor of Shanghai; Shanghai Municipal Party Standing Committee	Sub-provincial	Abuse of power, illegally possessing public assets, facilitating illicit sexual transactions, taking gifts and cash, frequenting private clubs, playing golf, did not retreat from his actions even after the 18th Party Congress; Convicted for taking bribes worth 43.21 million yuan (~$6.17 million)	Removed from all posts, expelled from the party, sentenced to 17 years in prison
Bai Xueshan 白雪山	November 6, 2015	Vice Chairman of Ningxia; Former Party Secretary of Wuzhong; Mayor of Yinchuan	Sub-provincial	Shallow sense of the duties of a party member, long took part in "superstitious activities", accepted bribes, and promoted the business interests of his relatives and associates, did not retreat from his actions even after the 18th Party Congress	Removed from all posts, expelled from the party, sentenced to 15 years in prison
Bai Yun 白云	August 29, 2014	Head of the United Front Work Department of Shanxi Province; Shanxi Provincial Party Standing Committee; Former Party Secretary of Yuncheng	Sub-provincial	Convicted on charges of abuse of power and accepting bribes worth 17.81 million yuan (~$2.54 million)	Removed from all posts, expelled from the party, sentenced to 12 years in prison
Cai Xiyou 蔡希有	February 6, 2016	President of Sinochem Group	Sub-provincial	Bribery, played golf, "morally depraved", engaged in money-for-sex transactions, did not retreat from his actions even after the 18th Party Congress	Removed from all posts, expelled from the party, sentenced to 12 years in prison
Cao Jianfang 曹建方	January 29, 2016	Secretary-General of the Party Committee of Yunnan; Yunnan Provincial Party Standing Committee	Sub-provincial		Expelled from the party, demoted to sub-division level (fuchuji)
Chang Xiaobing 常小兵	December 27, 2015	Chairman of China Telecom; Former Chairman of China Unicom	Sub-provincial	Convicted on taking bribes worth 3.76 million yuan (~$540,000); interfered in inspection work, and violated state-owned enterprise corporate governance rules	Removed from all posts, expelled from the party, sentenced to 6 years in prison
Chen Anzhong 陈安众	December 6, 2013	Vice-chairman of Jiangxi Provincial People's Congress; Former Vice-president of Jiangxi Provincial People's Political Consultative Conference	Sub-provincial	Convicted on charges of abuse of power and bribery, "morally depraved"	Removed from all posts, expelled from the party, sentenced to 12 years in prison.
Chen Baihuai 陈柏槐	November 19, 2013	Vice-chairman of Hubei Provincial People's Political Consultative Conference; Former Hubei province of Director of Agriculture	Sub-provincial	Convicted on charges of abuse of power, taking bribes worth 2.83 million yuan (~$470,000), and causing 610 million loss in state assets (~$84.5 million), "morally depraved"	Removed from all posts, expelled from the party, sentenced to 17 years in prison
Chen Chuanshu 陈传书	April 24, 2017	Member of the CCP Committee of the Ministry of Civil Affairs; Former President of China Aging Association	Sub-provincial	Serious failure of position	Placed on one-year probation within the Party, demoted to Bureau-Director level (zhengjuji)
Chen Shulong 陈树隆	November 8, 2016	Vice-Governor of Anhui	Sub-provincial	Violating political discipline, violating Eight-point Regulation, violating life discipline, "outlook on the world, life and values" were severely twisted, long took part in "superstitious activities", "morally bankrupt", immoderately engaging in money-for-sex and power-for-sex transactions, having intervened in market economic activities and judicial affairs, using public funds for his own recreational activities, bribery and abuse of power, did not retreat from his actions even after the 18th Party Congress	Removed from all posts, expelled from the party, sentenced to life in prison
Chen Tiexin 陈铁新	July 24, 2014	Vice Chairman of the Liaoning provincial People's Political Consultative Conference; Former Party Secretary of Chaoyang; Former Party Secretary of Dandong	Sub-provincial	Taking large bribes, receiving cash and gifts, adultery	Removed from all posts, expelled from the party, sentenced to 13 years and 9 months in prison
Chen Xu 陈旭	March 1, 2017	Former Prosecutor General of Shanghai People's Procuratorate	Sub-provincial	Violated Eight-point Regulation, played golf, long took part in "superstitious activities", breaching probity and organizational discipline, bribery, a typical instance of "did not retreat from his actions even after the 18th Party Congress"	Expelled from the party, sentenced to life in prison
Chen Xuefeng 陈雪枫	January 16, 2016	Party Secretary of Luoyang; Henan Provincial Party Standing Committee	Sub-provincial	Violated Eight-point Regulation, membership in private clubs, falsifying age, factionalism, engaging in money-for-sex and power-for-sex transactions; Convicted for taking bribes worth 125 million yuan (~$18.66 million) and contributing to loss of state assets, did not retreat from his actions even after the 18th Party Congress	Removed from all posts, Expelled from the party, sentenced to life in prison
Deng Qilin 邓崎琳	August 29, 2015	General manager of Wuhan Steel	Sub-provincial	Interfering in inspection work, long took part in "superstitious activities", occupying hotel room for personal use, engaging in power-for-sex transactions; Convicted for taking bribes worth 55.39 million yuan (~$7.91 million)	Expelled from the party, sentenced to 15 years in prison
Dou Yupei 窦玉沛	January 9, 2017	Vice Minister of Civil Affairs	Sub-provincial	Failing to impose strict party discipline at the ministry and allowing "systematic corruption" to occur under his leadership	Serious warning and ordered to retire early
Du Shanxue 杜善学	June 19, 2014	Vice-Governor of Shanxi; Shanxi Provincial Party Standing Committee; Former Secretary General of Shanxi Provincial Party Committee	Sub-provincial	Abuse of power, accepting and giving bribes, accepting cash gifts, adultery	Removed from all posts, expelled from the party, sentenced to life in prison
Fan Jian 范坚	January 29, 2016	Chief Economist of State Administration of Taxation	Sub-provincial		Expelled from the party, demoted to Deputy-Division-Head level (fuchuji)
Fu Xiaoguang 付晓光	December 17, 2013	Former Vice-Governor of Heilongjiang; Chair of the Heilongjiang Table Tennis Association	Sub-provincial	Alcohol abuse	Demoted to department-level (tingjuji), One-year party membership probation
Gai Ruyin 盖如垠	December 8, 2015	Vice Chairman of the Heilongjiang Provincial People's Congress; Former Party Secretary of Harbin	Sub-provincial	Dined out and travelled using public funds, frequented private clubs; violated regulations when promoting subordinates, abuse of power, bribery through wife and children; condoning activities of son; illicit sexual transactions, did not retreat from his actions even after the 18th Party Congress	Removed from all posts, expelled from the party, sentenced to 14 years in prison
Gong Qinggai 龚清概	January 19, 2016	Deputy Director of the Taiwan Affairs Office	Sub-provincial	Violates political discipline, membership in private clubs, plays golf, long took part in "superstitious activities", engaged in money-for-sex transactions, bribery, did not retreat from his actions even after the 18th Party Congress	Removed from all posts, expelled from the party, sentenced to 15 years in prison
Gu Junshan 谷俊山	November 14, 2012	Deputy Director of the General Logistics Department of the People's Liberation Army	Lieutenant-General	Convicted on charges of bribery, embezzlement, moving public funds, and abuse of power. Building out-sized properties.	Removed from all posts, expelled from the party, stripped of military rank, sentenced to death with two-year reprieve
Gu Chunli 谷春立	August 1, 2015	Vice Governor of Jilin	Sub-provincial	Membership in private clubs, accepting bribes, did not retreat from his actions even after the 18th Party Congress	Removed from all posts, expelled from the party, sentenced to 12 years in prison
Guo Yongxiang 郭永祥	June 22, 2013	President of Sichuan Federation of Literary and Art Circles; Former Vice-Governor of Sichuan	Sub-provincial	Abuse of power, taking large bribes, furthering son's business interests, "morally depraved"	Removed from all posts, expelled from the party, sentenced to 20 years in prison
Guo Youming 郭有明	November 27, 2013	Vice-Governor of Hubei; Former Party Secretary of Yichang	Sub-provincial	Abuse of power, taking large bribes through his family and friends, "morally depraved"	Removed from all posts, expelled from the party, sentenced to 15 years in prison
Han Xiancong 韩先聪	July 12, 2014	Vice-chairman of the Anhui Provincial Committee of the Chinese People's Political Consultative Conference; Former Secretary-general of the Anhui provincial government; Former Party Secretary of Chuzhou	Sub-provincial	Abuse of power, bribery, violating Eight-point Regulation	Removed from all posts, expelled from the party, sentenced to 16 years in prison
Han Xuejian 韩学键	December 22, 2014	Party Secretary of Daqing; Former Mayor of Daqing	Sub-provincial	Took bribes, abused power, did not retreat from his actions even after the 18th Party Congress	Removed from all posts, expelled from the party, sentenced to 12 years and 6 months in prison
Han Zhiran 韩志然	January 29, 2016	Vice-chairman of Inner Mongolia People's Political Consultative Conference; Former Party Secretary of Hohhot	Sub-provincial		Placed on two-year probation within the Party, demoted to department-level (futingji)
He Jiacheng 何家成	October 11, 2014	Executive vice-president of China National School of Administration; Vice-president of China National School of Administration	Provincial	Membership of clubs, accepted bribes, did not retreat from his actions even after the 18th Party Congress	Removed from all posts, expelled from the party, sentenced to 9 years in prison
He Jiatie 贺家铁	February 4, 2016	Hubei Provincial Standing Committee; Head of Organization Department of Hubei; Deputy leader of 4th, 5th Inspection Teams	Sub-provincial		Removed from all posts, demoted to department-level (tingji)
Jiang Jiemin 蒋洁敏	September 1, 2013	Director of the State-owned Assets Supervision and Administration Commission; Former chairman of the China National Petroleum Corporation	Provincial	Abuse of power, solicited and received massive bribes	Removed from all posts, expelled from the party, sentenced to 16 years in prison
Ji Jianye 季建业	October 16, 2013	Mayor of Nanjing; Deputy Party Secretary of Nanjing	Sub-provincial	Abuse of power, "morally depraved", taking bribes through his family; convicted of taking bribes worth 11.32 million yuan (~$1.82 million)	Removed from all posts, expelled from the party, sentenced to 15 years in prison
Ji Wenlin 冀文林	February 18, 2014	Vice-Governor of Hainan province; Former Mayor of Haikou	Sub-provincial	Abuse of power, taking and soliciting large bribes, adultery	Removed from all posts, expelled from the party, sentenced to 12 years in prison
Jin Daoming 金道铭	February 27, 2014	Vice-chairman of the Shanxi People's Congress; Deputy Party Secretary of Shanxi; Former Secretary of the Shanxi Commission for Discipline Inspection	Sub-provincial	Abuse of power, taking and soliciting large bribes, adultery	Removed from all posts, expelled from the party, sentenced to life in prison
Jing Chunhua 景春华	March 3, 2015	Hebei Provincial Party Standing Committee; Secretary-General of the Hebei Provincial Party Committee	Sub-provincial	Abuse of power, bribery, adultery, did not retreat from his actions even after the 18th Party Congress	Removed from all posts, expelled from the party, sentenced to 18 years in prison
Kong Lingzhong 孔令中	April 19, 2016	Vice-chairman of Guizhou Provincial Committee of the Chinese People's Political Consultative Conference	Sub-provincial	Violates political discipline, membership in private clubs	Placed on one-year probation within the Party, demoted to department-level (zhengtingji)
Lai Derong 赖德荣	July 22, 2016	Vice-chairman of Guangxi Provincial Committee of the Chinese People's Political Consultative Conference	Sub-provincial	Violates political discipline, membership in private clubs, gambling	Expelled from the party, demoted to section member (keyuan)
Le Dake 乐大克	June 26, 2015	Vice-chairman of the Tibet People's Congress	Sub-provincial	Bribery, conducting illicit sexual transactions, obstructing investigation, did not retreat from his actions even after the 18th Party Congress	Removed from all posts, expelled from the party, sentenced to 13 years in prison
Li Chengyun 李成云	April 9, 2016	Former Vice-Governor of Sichuan	Sub-provincial	Violates political discipline, bribery, abuse of power and corruption	Removed from all posts, expelled from the party, sentenced to 10 years in prison
Li Chongxi 李崇禧	December 29, 2013	Chairman of the Sichuan Provincial People's Political Consultative Conference	Provincial	Abuse of power, convicted of taking bribes worth 11.09 million yuan (~$1.75 million)	Removed from all posts, expelled from the party, sentenced to 12 years in prison
Li Daqiu 李达球	July 6, 2013	Vice-chairman of the Guangxi A.R. Political Consultative Conference; Former Party Secretary of Hezhou	Sub-provincial	Abuse of power; convicted of accepting bribes of 10.95 million yuan (~$1.8 million).	Removed from all posts, expelled from the party, sentenced to 15 years in prison
Li Hualin 李华林	August 27, 2013	Deputy General Manager of China National Petroleum Corporation	Sub-provincial		Under investigation
Li Jia 李嘉	March 23, 2016	Party Secretary of Zhuhai	Sub-provincial	Bribery, engaged in money-for-sex and power-for-sex transactions, formed cliques for private gain, providing falsified information to Party organs	Removed from all posts, expelled from the party, sentenced to 13 years in prison.
Li Jianbo 李建波	January 8, 2017	Member of Party Group of the Ministry of Transport	Sub-provincial		Removed from all posts
Li Wenke 李文科	February 28, 2017	Vice-chairman of the Liaoning People's Congress	Sub-provincial	Participated in a provincial canvassing vote-buying, bribery, liberally sold offices for cash, obtained pecuniary during making arrangements of a funeral	Removed from all posts, expelled from the party, sentenced to 16 years in prison
Liao Yongyuan 廖永远	March 16, 2015	President of China National Petroleum Corporation	Sub-provincial	Abuse of power, giving bribes, adultery; Convicted on taking bribes worth 13.39 million yuan ($~1.91 million), and amassing wealth of unclear origin, did not retreat from his actions even after the 18th Party Congress	Removed from all posts, expelled from the party, sentenced to 15 years in prison
Li Zhi 栗智	March 11, 2015	Vice-chairman of the Xinjiang Regional People's Congress; Former Party Secretary of Urumqi	Sub-provincial	Falsifying age, abuse of power, bribery, adultery, interfering with investigation, did not retreat from his actions even after the 18th Party Congress	Expelled from the party, sentenced to 12 years in prison
Liang Bin 梁滨	November 20, 2014	Head of Organization Department of the Communist Party Committee of Hebei; Hebei Provincial Party Standing Committee; Former Vice-Governor of Shanxi	Sub-provincial	Abuse of power, bribery, adultery	Removed from all posts, expelled from the party, sentenced to 8 years in prison
Liao Shaohua 廖少华	October 28, 2013	Party Secretary of Zunyi; Guizhou Provincial Party Standing Committee; Former Party Secretary of Qiandongnan Miao and Dong Autonomous Prefecture	Sub-provincial	Misuse of public funds; convicted of abuse of power and taking bribes worth 13.24 million yuan (~$2.13 million)	Removed from all posts, expelled from the party, sentenced to 16 years in prison
Ling Zhengce 令政策	June 19, 2014	Vice-chairman of Shanxi People's Political Consultative Conference; Former Director of Shanxi Development and Reform Commission	Sub-provincial	Violating "political rules", bribery, abuse of power, did not retreat from his actions even after the 18th Party Congress	Removed from all posts, expelled from the party, sentenced to 12 years and 6 months in prison
Liu Lizu 刘礼祖	January 29, 2016	Vice-chairman of Jiangxi Provincial Committee of the Chinese People's Political Consultative Conference	Sub-provincial		Expelled from the party, demoted to section staff-level (keyuan)
Liu Shanqiao 刘善桥	June 26, 2017	Vice-chairman of Hubei Provincial Committee of the Chinese People's Political Consultative Conference; Former Party Secretary of Huanggang	Sub-provincial	Bribery, engaged in money-for-sex and power-for-sex transactions, did not retreat from his actions even after the 18th Party Congress	Removed from all posts, expelled from the party, sentenced to 12 years in prison
Liu Tienan 刘铁男	May 12, 2013	Director of the National Energy Administration; Vice-chairman of National Development and Reform Commission	Sub-provincial	Bribery, "morally depraved"	Removed from all posts, expelled from the party, sentenced to life in prison
Liu Xinqi 刘新齐	May 24, 2017	Commander of Xinjiang Production and Construction Corps	General	Breaching political, organizational, probity and work discipline	Expelled from the party, demoted to division level (zhengchuji)
Liu Zhigeng 刘志庚	February 4, 2016	Vice Governor of Guangdong; Former Party Secretary of Dongguan	Sub-provincial	Superstitious activities, membership in private clubs, engaged in power-for-sex transactions, bribery	Removed from all posts, expelled from the party, sentenced to life in prison
Liu Zhiyong 刘志勇	January 29, 2016	Vice-chairman of Guangxi People's Political Consultative Conference; Former Party Secretary of Wuzhou	Sub-provincial		Placed on two-year probation within the Party, removed from party post, and demoted to department-level (tingjuji)
Lu Enguang 卢恩光	December 16, 2016	Director of Political Department of Ministry of Justice	Sub-provincial	Falsified archival documents, giving bribes	Removed from all posts, expelled from the party, sentenced to 12 years in prison
Lu Wucheng 陆武成	January 23, 2015	Vice Chairman of the Standing Committee of the Gansu Provincial People's Congress	Sub-provincial	Bribery, did not retreat from his actions even after the 18th Party Congress	Removed from all posts, expelled from the party, sentenced to 12 years and 6 months in prison
Lu Ziyue 卢子跃	March 16, 2016	Mayor of Ningbo	Sub-provincial	Bribery, engaged in money-for-sex and power-for-sex transactions, long took part in "superstitious activities", membership in private clubs, lived a life of luxury and pleasure seeking, did not retreat from his actions even after the 18th Party Congress	Removed from all posts, expelled from the party, sentenced to life in prison
Ma Jian 马建	January 16, 2015	Vice Minister of State Security	Sub-provincial	Bribery, did not retreat from his actions even after the 18th Party Congress	Removed from all posts, expelled from the party, sentenced to life in prison
Mao Xiaobing 毛小兵	April 24, 2014	Party Secretary of Xining; Former Mayor of Xining	Sub-provincial	Abuse of power, adultery; convicted on charges of accepting bribes worth 104.8 million yuan (~$14.97 million) and redirecting public funds worth 400 million yuan (~$57 million)	Removed from all posts, expelled from the party, sentenced to life in prison
Ni Fake 倪发科	June 4, 2013	Vice-Governor of Anhui; Former Party Secretary of Wuhu; Former Mayor and Party Secretary of Lu'an	Sub-provincial	Abuse of power, "morally depraved", amassing jade collection. Convicted of accepting bribes worth 13.48 million yuan (~$2.15 million).	Removed from all posts, expelled from the party, sentenced to 17 years in prison
Nie Chunyu 聂春玉	August 23, 2014	Secretary-General of the Shanxi Party Committee; Shanxi Provincial Party Standing Committee; Former Party Secretary of Lüliang	Sub-provincial	Abuse of power, took monetary gifts, adultery; Convicted on charges of accepting bribes worth 44.58 million yuan (~$6.36 million)	Removed from all posts, expelled from the party, sentenced to 15 years in prison
Qin Yuhai 秦玉海	September 21, 2014	Vice Chairman of the Henan Provincial People's Congress; Former Vice Governor of Henan	Sub-provincial	Bribery, took monetary gifts, wasted public resources, abuse of power, adultery, did not retreat from his actions even after the 18th Party Congress	Removed from all posts, expelled from the party, sentenced to 13 years and 6 months in prison
Ren Runhou 任润厚	August 29, 2014	Vice-Governor of Shanxi; Former President of Lu'an Group	Sub-provincial	Embezzlement of public funds, taking and giving bribes, receiving cash gifts	Removed from all posts, died during investigation, posthumously expelled from the party
Shen Peiping 沈培平	March 9, 2014	Vice-Governor of Yunnan; Former Party Secretary and Mayor of Pu'er	Sub-provincial	Abuse of power, taking large bribes, adultery	Removed from all posts; expelled from the party; sentenced to 12 years in prison
Shen Weichen 申维辰	April 12, 2014	Party Group Secretary of China Association for Science and Technology; Former Deputy Head of the Central Propaganda Department of the Chinese Communist Party	Provincial	Abuse of power, took massive bribes, received gifts of cash, and committed adultery	Removed from all posts, expelled from the party, sentenced to life in prison
Si Xianmin 司献民	November 4, 2015	Chairman of China Southern Airlines; General manager of China Southern Airlines	Sub-provincial	violated Eight-point Regulation, played golf with public funds, accepted bribes, did not retreat from his actions even after the 18th Party Congress	Removed from all posts; expelled from the party, sentenced to 10 years and 6 months in prison
Si Xinliang 斯鑫良	February 16, 2015	Vice Chairman of the Zhejiang Provincial People's Political Consultative Conference; Former Head of the Organization Department of the Zhejiang Party Committee	Sub-provincial	Bribery, accepting golf rounds paid for by others, abuse of power, adultery, obstruction of investigation, did not retreat from his actions even after the 18th Party Congress	Expelled from the party, sentenced to 13 years in prison
Song Lin 宋林	April 17, 2014	Chairman of China Resources	Sub-provincial	Violating Political rules and organizational discipline, abuse of power, bribery, expense claim violations, took on other part-time positions, using public funds to play golf, embezzlement, adultery	Removed from all posts; expelled from the party, sentenced to 14 years in prison
Su Hongzhang 苏宏章	April 6, 2016	Secretary of the Political and Legal Affairs Commission of Liaoning	Sub-provincial	Bribery, participated in a provincial canvassing vote-buying, engaged in money-for-sex transactions	Removed from all posts; expelled from the party, sentenced to 14 years in prison
Sui Fengfu 隋凤富	November 27, 2014	Vice Chairman of the Heilongjiang Provincial People's Congress; Party Committee Secretary of Heilongjiang Provincial State-owned Farms Administrative Bureau	Sub-provincial	Abuse of power, bribery, did not retreat from his actions even after the 18th Party Congress	Removed from all posts, expelled from the party, sentenced to 11 years in prison
Sun Hongzhi 孙鸿志	December 26, 2014	Vice-Minister of the State Administration for Industry and Commerce; Former Mayor of Songyuan	Sub-provincial	Using official vehicle for personal reasons, used public funds for food, lodging, and travelling, bribery, adultery, did not retreat from his actions even after the 18th Party Congress	Removed from all posts, expelled from the party, sentenced to 18 years in prison
Sun Qingyun 孙清云	November 2015	Vice-chairman of Shaanxi Provincial Committee of the Chinese People's Political Consultative Conference	Sub-provincial		Placed on two-year probation within the Party, demoted to Division-Head level (chuji)
Sun Zhaoxue 孙兆学	September 15, 2014	Chief executive of Chinalco; Former CEO of China Gold	Sub-provincial	Bribery, adultery	Removed from all posts, expelled from the party, sentenced to 16 years in prison
Tan Li 谭力	July 8, 2014	Vice-Governor of Hainan; Former Party Secretary of Mianyang	Sub-provincial	Abuse of power, bribery, adultery, engaging in expensive hobbies	Removed from all posts, expelled from the party, sentenced to life in prison
Tan Qiwei 谭栖伟	May 3, 2014	Vice-chairman of Chongqing People's Congress; Former Vice-Mayor of Chongqing	Sub-provincial	Abuse of power, taking large bribes personally and through wife	Removed from all posts, expelled from the party, sentenced to twelve years in prison
Tong Mingqian 童名谦	December 18, 2013	Vice-chairman of Hunan provincial Political Consultative Conference; Former Party Secretary of Hengyang	Sub-provincial	Dereliction of duty and negligence during a provincial vote-buying scandal	Removed from all posts, expelled from the party, sentenced to 5 years in prison
Wang Shuaiting 王帅廷	May 16, 2014	Director of China Resources	Sub-provincial	Accepted bribes, plundering the public funds	Removed from all posts, expelled from the party, sentenced to 16 years in prison
Wang Bao'an 王保安	January 26, 2016	Director of the National Bureau of Statistics; Former Vice Minister of Finance	Sub-provincial	Membership in private clubs, made speeches that went against the CCP Central Committee on key issues, accepting bribes, long took part in "superstitious activities", "morally bankrupt", immoderately engaging in money-for-sex and power-for-sex transactions, did not retreat from his actions even after the 18th Party Congress	Removed from all posts, expelled from the party, sentenced to life in prison
Wang Suyi 王素毅	June 30, 2013	Head of Inner Mongolia United Front Work Department; Inner Mongolia Autonomous Region Party Standing Committee; Former Party Secretary of Bayannur	Sub-provincial	Abuse of power for the illicit gain of others. Convicted of accepting bribes in cash and gifts worth some 10.73 million yuan (~$1.74 million)	Removed from all posts, expelled from the party, sentenced to life in prison
Wang Tianpu 王天普	April 27, 2015	General manager of China Petrochemical Corporation	Sub-provincial	Bribery, plundering the public funds, did not retreat from his actions even after the 18th Party Congress	Removed from all posts, expelled from the party, sentenced to 15 years and 6 months in prison
Wang Yang 王阳	March 16, 2016	Vice-chairman of the Liaoning People's Congress	Sub-provincial	Bribery, participated in a provincial canvassing vote-buying, violated Eight-point Regulation	Removed from all posts, expelled from the party, sentenced to 16 years and 6 months in prison
Wang Yincheng 王银成	February 23, 2017	President of the People's Insurance Company of China	Sub-provincial	Bribery, engaging in superstitious activities, playing golf, changing his itinerary to play golf while on foreign trips, stacking insurance system with relatives and friends, occupying the company's activities room for personal use, pursuit of luxury, selling office space for below market value	Removed from all posts, expelled from the party, sentenced to 11 years in prison
Wang Zhongtian 王仲田	January 8, 2017	Deputy Director of the Office of the South–North Water Transfer Project	Sub-provincial		Removed the party post
Wei Hong 魏宏	January 15, 2016	Governor of Sichuan	Provincial	Disloyalty to the party, breaching political and organizational discipline, interfering with law enforcement, being dishonest and obstruction of investigation	Removed from all posts, demoted to sub-department-level (futingji)
Wei Minzhou 魏民洲	May 22, 2017	Vice-chairman of the Shaanxi People's Congress; Former Party Secretary of Xi'an	Sub-provincial	Violated political discipline, violated Eight-point Regulation, violated organizational discipline, long took part in "superstitious activities", engaged in political opportunism and careerism, bribery, did not retreat from his actions even after the 18th Party Congress	Removed from all posts, expelled from the party, sentenced to life in prison
Wu Changshun 武长顺	July 20, 2014	Vice Chairman of the Tianjin Municipal Committee of the Chinese People's Political Consultative Conference; Former Police Commissioner, Tianjin Public Security Bureau	Sub-provincial	Abuse of power, inappropriate expense claims, giving and accepting bribes, embezzlement, redirecting public funds for illicit use, adultery, did not retreat from his actions even after the 18th Party Congress	Removed from all posts, expelled from the party, sentenced to death sentence with two-year reprieve without commutation or parole
Wu Tianjun 吴天君	November 11, 2016	Party Secretary of Zhengzhou	Sub-provincial	Bribery, dishonest when handling people's petitions, did not retreat from his actions even after the 18th Party Congress	Removed from all posts, expelled from the party, sentenced to 11 years in prison
Wu Yongwen 吴永文	January 20, 2013	Vice Chairman of the Hubei Provincial People's Congress; Former Secretary Political and Legal Affairs of the Hubei Party Committee	Sub-provincial		Removed from all posts
Xi Xiaoming 奚晓明	July 12, 2015	Vice-president of the Supreme People's Court	Sub-provincial	Accepting bribes, leaking classified trial information to unauthorized parties, did not retreat from his actions even after the 18th Party Congress	Removed from all posts, expelled from the party, sentenced to life in prison
Xiao Tian 肖天	June 25, 2015	Deputy Director of State General Administration of Sports	Sub-provincial	Accepting bribes, playing golf, changing schedules for overseas business trips to stay extra days abroad, membership in private clubs, did not retreat from his actions even after the 18th Party Congress	Removed from all posts, expelled from the party, sentenced to 10 years and 6 months in prison
Xu Aimin 许爱民	February 2015	Deputy Chairman of Jiangxi Provincial Committee of the Chinese People's Political Consultative Conference	Sub-provincial		Expelled from the party, demoted to deputy division-level (fuchuji)
Xu Gang 徐钢	March 20, 2015	Vice Governor of Fujian; Former Party Secretary of Quanzhou	Sub-provincial	Violating the Eight-point Regulation, bribery, advancing business interests of wife, playing golf rounds paid for by others, did not retreat from his actions even after the 18th Party Congress	Removed from all posts, expelled from the party, sentenced to 13 years in prison
Xu Jianyi 徐建一	March 15, 2015	Chairman of FAW Group	Sub-provincial	Not carrying out decisions made by the [party] organization, seeking promotion for his son, purchasing real estate which "contravened the interests of the state", illegally procured bonuses, bribery, obstructing investigation, did not retreat from his actions even after the 18th Party Congress	Removed from all posts, expelled from the party, sentenced on 11 years and 6 months in prison
Yan Shiyuan 颜世元	June 2015	Head of the United Front Work Department of Shandong; Shandong Provincial Party Standing Committee	Sub-provincial		Placed on two-year probation within the Party, demoted to sub-department level (futingji)
Yang Gang 杨刚	December 27, 2013	Deputy Director of the General Administration of Quality Supervision, Inspection and Quarantine; Former Deputy Party Secretary of Xinjiang	Sub-provincial	Abuse of power, taking "massive bribes", and adultery	Removed from all posts, expelled from the party, sentenced to twelve years in prison
Yang Baohua 阳宝华	May 26, 2014	Vice-chairman of Hunan Provincial Committee of the Chinese People's Political Consultative Conference	Sub-provincial	Taking bribes and adultery	Expelled from the party, sentenced to 11 years in prison
Yang Jiacai 杨家才	May 23, 2017	Director of the China Banking Regulatory Commission	Sub-provincial	Accepting bribes, entering private clubs	Removed from all posts, expelled from the party, sentenced to 16 years in prison
Yang Luyu 杨鲁豫	April 6, 2016	Mayor of Jinan	Sub-provincial	Violated Eight-point Regulation, engaged in money-for-sex and power-for-sex transactions, bribery, did not retreat from his actions even after the 18th Party Congress	Removed from all posts, expelled from the party, sentenced to 14 years in prison
Yang Zhenchao 杨振超	May 24, 2016	Vice Governor of Anhui	Sub-provincial	Bribery and abuse of power, did not retreat from his actions even after the 18th Party Congress	Removed from all posts, expelled from the party, sentenced to life in prison
Yao Gang 姚刚	November 13, 2015	Vice-chairman at the China Securities Regulatory Commission	Sub-provincial	Bribery, illegally making gains from insider trading	Removed from all posts, expelled from the party, sentenced to 18 years in prison
Yao Mugen 姚木根	March 22, 2014	Vice-Governor of Jiangxi; Former Chairman of Jiangxi Development and Reform Commission	Sub-provincial	Abuse of power, bribery	Removed from all posts, expelled from the party, sentenced to thirteen years in prison
Yao Zhongmin 姚中民	June 6, 2016	Chairman of the China Development Bank	Sub-provincial	Accepted bribes worth 36.19 million yuan, engaged in money-for-sex and power-for-sex transactions, violated the "Eight-point Regulation" and unrepentant	Expelled from the party, sentenced to 14 years in prison
Yi Junqing 衣俊卿	January 17, 2013	Director of the Compilation and Translation Bureau of the Central Committee	Sub-provincial	"Lifestyle issues", extramarital sex	Removed from post
Yin Hailin 尹海林	August 22, 2016	Mayor of Tianjin	Sub-provincial	Violated Eight-point Regulation, violated work discipline	Expelled from the party, demoted to sub-division level (fuchuji)
Yu Haiyan 虞海燕	January 11, 2017	Vice-Governor of Gansu; Former Communist Party Secretary of Lanzhou	Sub-provincial	Bribery, engaged in power-for-sex transactions, factionalism, used public funds for his own recreational activities	Removed from all posts, expelled from the party, sentenced to 15 years in prison
Zhang Lifu 张力夫	March 30, 2016	Vice-chairman of the Hainan People's Congress	Sub-provincial	Violating the Eight-point Regulation, accepting meal invitations that used public funds, violating organizational discipline and work discipline	Expelled from the party, demoted to deputy section-head level (fukeji)
Zhang Lijun 张力军	July 30, 2015	Vice-Minister of Environmental Protection	Sub-provincial	Bribery, did not retreat from his actions even after the 18th Party Congress	Removed from all posts, expelled from the party, sentenced to 4 years in prison
Zhang Tianxin 张田欣	July 16, 2014	Party Secretary of Kunming; Former Yunnan Provincial Party Standing Committee	Sub-provincial	Wasting public resources, abuse of power for personal gain	Removed from all posts, expelled from the party, demoted to deputy division-level (fuchuji)
Zhang Wenxiong 张文雄	November 8, 2016	Party Secretary of Hengyang; Former Hunan Provincial Party Standing Committee; Head of the Hunan Provincial Party Propaganda Department	Sub-provincial	Bribery, did not retreat from his actions even after the 18th Party Congress	Removed from all posts, expelled from the party, sentenced to 15 years in prison
Zhang Yue 张越	April 16, 2016	Secretary of Legal Affairs Commission of Hebei	Sub-provincial	Violated Eight-point Regulation, long took part in "superstitious activities", played golf, lived a life of luxury and pleasure seeking, engaged in money-for-sex and power-for-sex transactions, bribery, did not retreat from his actions even after the 18th Party Congress	Removed from all posts, expelled from the party, sentenced to 15 years in prison
Zhang Yun 张云	January 29, 2016	President of Agricultural Bank of China	Sub-provincial		Placed on two-year probation within the Party, removed post, and demoted
Zhao Shaolin 赵少麟	October 11, 2014	Former Secretary General of Jiangsu Provincial Party Committee; Former Jiangsu Provincial Party Standing Committee	Sub-provincial	Forming a clique within the party, aiding business interests of son, giving bribes, foreign exchange fraud	Expelled from the party, sentenced to 4 years in prison
Zhao Liping 赵黎平	March 21, 2015	Former Vice-chairman of the Inner Mongolia People's Political Consultative Conference; Former Vice-chairman of the Inner Mongolia; Former Director of Public Security Department of Inner Mongolia	Sub-provincial	Murder, aid in the promotion and business activities of associates, and "illegally possessed bullets and guns", "severely violated socialist morality by engaging in adultery", and took bribes	Expelled from the party, sentenced to death and executed
Zhao Zhiyong 赵智勇	June 3, 2014	Secretary-General of Jiangxi Provincial Party Committee; Former Jiangxi Provincial Party Standing Committee; Former Party Secretary of Jiujiang	Sub-provincial	Abuse of power for personal gain	Removed from all posts, expelled from the party, demoted to administrative rank of keyuan
Zhang Huawei 张化为	April 17, 2017	Inspector-General of Central Leading Group for Inspection Work	Sub-provincial	Bribery, violated Eight-point Regulation, did not retreat from his actions even after the 18th Party Congress	Expelled from the party, sentenced to 12 years in prison
Zheng Yuzhuo 郑玉焯	August 26, 2016	Vice-chairman of Liaoning Provincial People's Congress	Sub-provincial	Participated in a provincial canvassing vote-buying, solicited 30 iPhone 4S (worth 0.156 million yuan) for unjust canvassing	Removed from all posts, expelled from the party, sentenced to 3 years and 6 months in prison
Zhou Chunyu 周春雨	April 26, 2017	Vice Governor of Anhui	Sub-provincial	Violated political discipline, organization discipline and life discipline; bribery, concealing offshore deposits, did not retreat from his actions even after the 18th Party Congress	Removed from all posts, expelled from the party, sentenced to 20 years in prison
Zhou Laizhen 周来振	November 24, 2015	Deputy director of the Civil Aviation Administration of China	Sub-provincial	Taking bribes worth 25.33 million yuan, playing golf, changing his itinerary while on foreign trips, did not retreat from his actions even after the 18th Party Congress	Removed from all posts, expelled from the party, sentenced to 15 years in prison
Zhu Fushou 朱福寿	November 2, 2015	General manager of Dongfeng Motor	Sub-provincial		Expelled from the party, demoted
Zhu Zuoli 祝作利	February 19, 2014	Vice-chairman of Shaanxi Provincial Committee of the Chinese People's Political Consultative Conference; Former Director of the Shaanxi Development and Reform Commission	Sub-provincial	Taking bribes	Removed from all posts, expelled from the party, sentenced to eleven years in prison

== Generals of the military ==
- Cai Guangliao, major general, deputy director of the Social and Legislative Committee of the Guangdong People's Political Consultative Conference
- Chen Qiang, major general, Deputy Commander of 96351 Unit of the Second Artillery Corps
- Dai Weimin, major general, Deputy Dean at the People's Liberation Army Nanjing Political College
- Deng Ruihua, major general, Political Commissar of the Joint Logistics Department of Lanzhou Military Region
- Dong Mingxiang, major general, Head of the Joint Logistics Department of Beijing Military Region
- Duan Tianjie, major general, deputy director of the Political Department of PLA National Defence University
- Fan Changmi, lieutenant general, alternate Central Committee member, Deputy Political Commissar of Lanzhou Military Region
- Fang Wenping, major general, Commander of Shanxi Military District
- Fu Linguo, major general, Deputy Chief of Staff of Command of the People's Liberation Army General Logistics Department
- Fu Yi, major general, Commander of Zhejiang Military Command
- Gao Xiaoyan (female), major general, Political Commissar and Discipline Inspection Secretary of the PLA Information Engineering University
- Gu Junshan, lieutenant general, former deputy director of the People's Liberation Army General Logistics Department
- Guo Boxiong, general, former Vice Chairman of the Central Military Commission, member of the 17th Politburo
- Guo Zhenggang, major general, Deputy Political Commissar of Zhejiang Military District, son of Guo Boxiong
- Jiang Zhonghua, rear admiral, Head of the armament department of the South Sea Fleet, committed suicide
- Kou Tie, major general, Commander of Heilongjiang Military District
- Liu Zhanqi, major general of the Armed Police, Chief of the People's Armed Police traffic command
- Liu Zheng, lieutenant general, Deputy Head of the People's Liberation Army General Logistics Department
- Ma Faxiang, vice admiral, Deputy Political Commissar of the People's Liberation Army Navy, committed suicide
- Wang Minggui, major general, Political Commissar of People's Liberation Army Air Force Command College
- Wang Yufa, lieutenant general, former Deputy political commissar of the Guangzhou Military Region
- Wei Jin, major general, Deputy Political Commissar of Tibet Military District
- Xu Caihou, general, former Vice Chairman of the Central Military Commission, member of the 17th Politburo
- Yang Jinshan, lieutenant general, member of the Central Committee, Deputy Commander of Chengdu Military Region
- Ye Wanyong, major general, Political Commissar of Sichuan Military District
- Yu Daqing, lieutenant general, Deputy Political Commissar of the Second Artillery Corps
- Zhan Guoqiao, major general, Head of the Joint Logistics Department of Lanzhou Military Region
- Zhan Jun, major general, Deputy Commander of Hubei Military District
- Zhang Daixin, major general, Deputy Commander of Heilongjiang Military District
- Zhang Qibin, major general, Deputy Chief of Staff of the Jinan Military Region
- Zhang Wansong, major general, Director of the Joint Logistics Department of Lanzhou Military Region
- Zhou Guotai, major general, Deputy Head of Oil Supplies Division of PLA General Logistics Department
- Zhou Minggui, major general, deputy director of the Political Department of Nanjing Military Region

== Other notable cases ==
- Adil Nurmemet, mayor of Hotan, ethnic Uyghur
- Feng Lixiang, party chief of Datong
- Guo Yipin, vice-mayor of Luoyang, went into hiding upon learning that he might be under investigation; later arrested
- Jia Xiaoye, Zhou Yongkang's wife. She was sentenced to 9 years in prison for taking bribes, influence-using bribery by the Intermediate People's Court in Yichang on June 15, 2016
- Jiang Zunyu, head of the Political and Legal Affairs Commission of Shenzhen; sentenced to life in prison but denied most of the charges against him
- Li Huabo, a former local official in Poyang county, Jiangxi Province. Evaded Chinese authorities and went to Singapore in 2011, and deported from Singapore in 2015. Li was sentenced to life in prison for corruption worth 94 million yuan by the Intermediate People's Court in Shangrao on January 23, 2017
- Ma Chaoqun, a municipal water works administrator from Qinhuangdao. Gained notoriety because millions of dollars of bribes were located in his apartment during an investigation by the authorities
- Qu Songzhi, Li Chuncheng's wife, former director of the Red Cross Society of Chengdu. She was sentenced to seven years in prison for taking bribes on January 8, 2016
- Tao Yuchun, a former senior executive of China National Petroleum Corporation (CNPC). On September 27, 2016, Tao was sentenced to 23 years in prison for corruption worth 46 million yuan, embezzling public funds worth 9 million yuan, illegal profits for relatives, and abuse of power by the Intermediate People's Court in Zhuhai
- Wang Guoqiang, a former Party chief of Fengcheng city in northeast China's Liaoning Province. Evaded Chinese authorities and fled abroad in 2012, before being deported from the United States in 2014. Wang was sentenced to 8 years in prison for taking bribes worth 9.59 million yuan and unidentified property by the Intermediate People's Court in Shenyang on January 23, 2017
- Wei Pengyuan, a former deputy director of the National Energy Administration's coal department. Gained notoriety because worth over 200 million yuan of cash of bribes were found in his house in Beijing in 2014. On October 17, 2016, Wei was sentenced to death with a two-year reprieve without commutation or parole when the sentence was automatically reduced to life imprisonment for taking bribes worth 211.7 million yuan and unidentified 131 million yuan property by the Intermediate People's Court in Baoding
- Yang Xiaobo (female), mayor of Gaoping, Shanxi
- Yang Xiuzhu (female), former deputy director of Zhejiang Construction Department and deputy mayor of Wenzhou. Evaded Chinese authorities and fled abroad in 2003, before being deported from the United States in 2016
- Yu Tieyi, a former deputy manager of the supply division of the Longmay Mining Holding Group. On October 21, 2016, Yu was sentenced to death with a two-year reprieve without commutation or parole when the sentence was automatically reduced to life imprisonment for taking bribes worth 306.8 million yuan by the Intermediate People's Court of Heilongjiang Forest Region in Harbin
- Zhong Shijian, Guangdong party discipline official who was himself investigated
- Zhou Bin, Zhou Yongkang's son. He was sentenced to 18 years in prison for taking bribes, influence peddling, and unlawful business operation by the Intermediate People's Court in Yichang on June 15, 2016
- Zhou Feng, Zhou Yongkang's nephew. He was sentenced to 12 years in prison for write false value added tax invoices and influence peddling by the Intermediate People's Court in Yichang on June 17, 2016

=== Non-political personalities ===
- Gu Xin, musician, former executive chairman of the China Oriental Performing Arts Group
- Liu Han, former Sichuan development mogul, former executive chairman of Hanlong Group, executed
- Mao Xiaofeng, former chief executive of China Minsheng Bank, thought to be implicated in the Ling Jihua case
- Rui Chenggang, CCTV economics channel anchor, linked to Ling Jihua and others by Chinese-language media
- Xu Xiang, stock trader
- Ye Yingchun, CCTV anchor, speculated by numerous media sources as having had sexual relations with Zhou Yongkang
- Huang Hong, comedian known for skit performances on the CCTV New Year's Gala, fired from his leading post at the August 1st Film Studios in 2015, thought to have been implicated in corruption but not charged
