= 豊富 =

豊富, 豐富 or 丰富, meaning "richness", may refer to:

- Fengfu (disambiguation), the Chinese transliteration
- Toyotomi (disambiguation), the Japanese transliteration
