= Petroleum University =

Petroleum University or University of Petroleum may refer to:

- China University of Petroleum, Dongying, Shandong
- Federal University of Petroleum Resource Effurun, Delta State, Nigeria
- King Fahd University of Petroleum and Minerals, Dhahran, Saudi Arabia
- Liaoning University of Petroleum and Chemical Technology, Fushun, Liaoning, China
- Pandit Deendayal Petroleum University, Raisan, Gandhinagar, Gujarat, India
- Petroleum University of Technology, Abadan, Iran
- Southwest Petroleum University, Chengdu, Sichuan, China
- University of Petroleum and Energy Studies, Dehradun, Uttarakhand, India
- Ufa State Petroleum Technological University, Ufa, Republic of Bashkortostan, Russia
