= Six Prohibitions =

Chinese Communist Party set of rules

The Six Prohibitions (Chinese: 六项禁令; pinyin: Liùxiàng jìnlìng) is a set of regulations issued by the Chinese Communist Party (CCP) to combat corruption.

== History ==
On December 4, 2012, the Politburo of the Chinese Communist Party held a meeting, at which General Secretary Xi Jinping proposed and issued the Eight-point Regulation. On December 26, 2012, Zhejiang Provincial Committee independently created six more central prohibitions based on the eight regulations. These were later widely forwarded by the Chinese Communist Party authorities and news media controlled by the CCP and officially named the Six Prohibitions.

== Content ==
The Six Prohibitions are:

1. It is strictly forbidden to use public funds for mutual visits, gift giving, banquets and other New Year greetings activities.
2. It is strictly forbidden to present local specialties to superior departments.
3. It is strictly prohibited to receive or give gifts, cash gifts, securities, payment vouchers and commercial prepaid cards in violation of regulations.
4. It is strictly forbidden to spend money and materials indiscriminately, show off, compete for wealth, and engage in extravagance and waste.
5. It is strictly forbidden to provide reception services that exceed the standard. When leading cadres conduct field research, attend meetings, and inspect work, they must strictly follow the relevant requirements of the Central Committee and the Provincial Party Committee.
6. It is strictly forbidden to organize or participate in gambling activities. Party members and cadres at all levels must fully understand the serious harm of gambling and must not organize or participate in any form of gambling activities.
