= Chen Qiang =

Chen Qiang may refer to:

- Chen Qiang (actor) (1918–2012), Chinese actor and comedian
- Chen Qiang (general) (born 1956), Chinese major general
