= Cai Xiyou =

Chinese economist

- 蔡希有
- Born: August 1961 (age 64–65); Dandong, Liaoning, China
- Education: Liaoning University of Petroleum and Chemical Technology
- Occupation: Economist
- Years active: 1995–2017
- Agents: Sinopec Group; Sinochem Group
- Title: General Manager of the Sinochem Group
- Term: 28 August 2014 - 7 November 2016
- Predecessor: Liu Deshu
- Successor: Zhang Wei

Cai Xiyou (Chinese: 蔡希有; pinyin: Cài Xīyǒu; born August 1961) is a Chinese economist who served as general manager of the Sinochem Group from 2014 to 2016, while he was sacked for graft. On July 6, 2017, he had been stripped of his post and party membership. Cai had political ties with Su Shulin, former deputy party chief and governor of Fujian province.

== Career ==
Cai was born in August 1961 in Dandong, Liaoning province. After graduating from Fushun Oil College (now Liaoning University of Petroleum and Chemical Technology) in 1981, he was assigned to Sinopec Group. Beginning in 1998, he served in several posts in Sinopec sales company, including deputy general manager, executive deputy general manager and general manager. In December 2001, he was promoted to general manager and party boss of the China International United Petroleum & Chemicals Co., Ltd. (UNIPEC). In April 2003, he was vice-president of Sinopec Group, rising to senior vice-president in November 2005. In 2012 he was appointed president of the Sinopec Engineering (Group) Co., Ltd. (SEG). In August 2014, he was promoted again to become president of the Sinochem Group.

== Downfall ==
On February 6, 2016, the Central Commission for Discipline Inspection said that Cai Xiyou has come under investigation for "serious legal violations" in a statement on its website. In March 2016, Cai was stripped of his post. In July 2017, the procuratorate has placed a case on file to investigate Cai Xiyou, and he was removed from membership of the Chinese Communist Party.

On December 26, 2018, Cai was sentenced to 12 years in prison and fined three million yuan for taking bribes worth 53.67 million yuan in Tai'an People's Intermediate Court.

Business positions
Preceded by Liu Deshu (刘德树)	General Manager of the Sinochem Group; 2014–2016	Succeeded by Zhang Wei (张伟)
