= Ai Baojun =

Chinese politician

Ai Baojun 艾宝俊
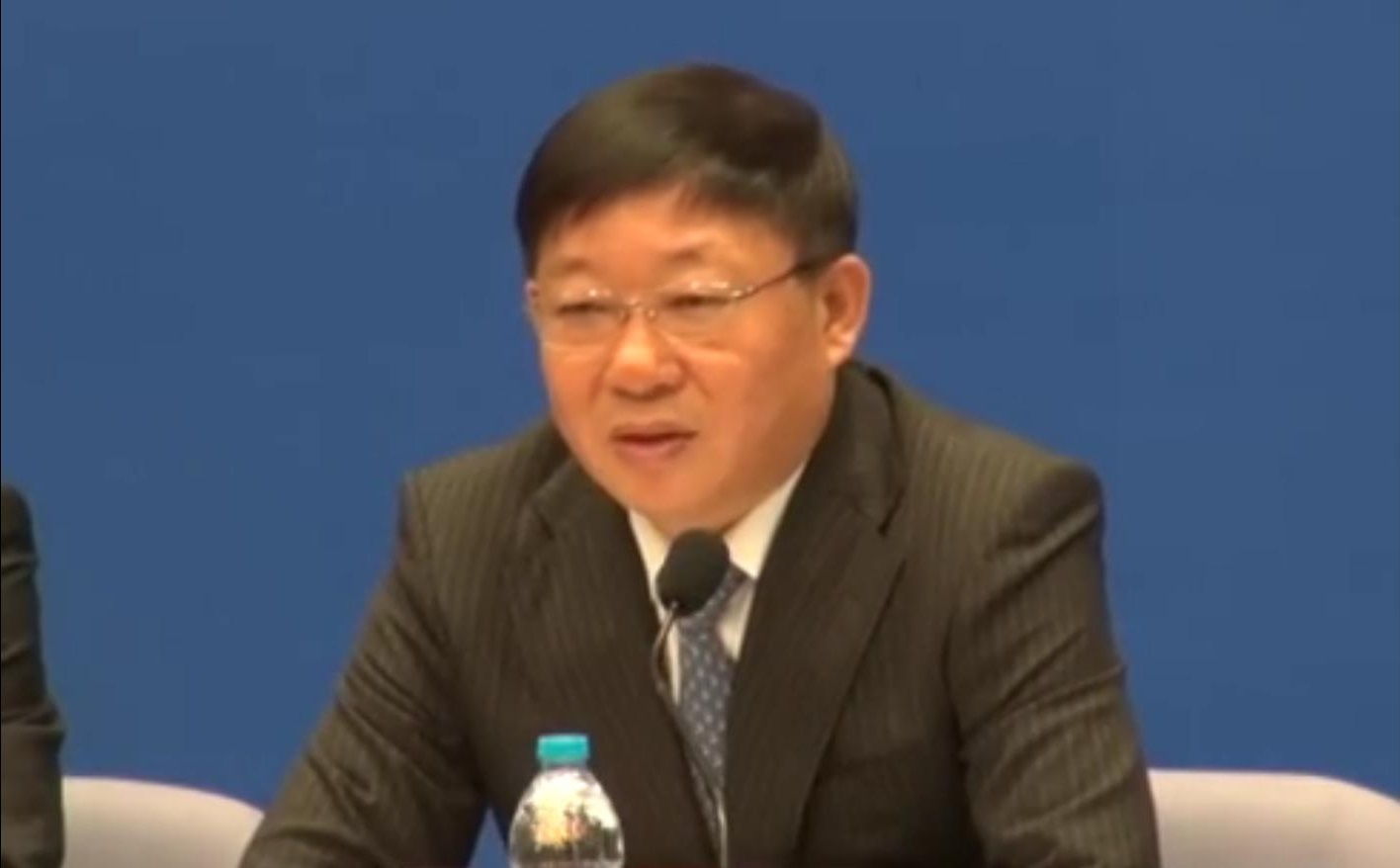

Vice Mayor of Shanghai
- In office December 2012 – November 2015

Personal details
- Born: February 1960 (age 66) Liaoyang, Liaoning
- Party: Chinese Communist Party (Expelled)
- Education: Northeastern Polytechnic College
- Occupation: Politician

Ai Baojun (simplified Chinese: 艾宝俊; traditional Chinese: 艾寶俊; pinyin: Ài Bǎojùn; born February 1960) is a former Chinese politician. He was the Vice Mayor of Shanghai and the head administrator of the Shanghai Free-Trade Zone. On November 10, 2015, Ai was placed under investigation by the Communist Party's anti-corruption agency. He was the first provincial-ministerial level official from Shanghai being investigated after the 18th Party Congress in 2012. He is said to be close with Jiang Mianheng, son of former Chinese Communist Party general secretary Jiang Zemin.

== Career ==
Ai Baojun was born in Liaoyang, Liaoning province. He attended Northeastern Polytechnic College (later merged into Northeastern University), where he studied automated controls. He then studied statistics and accounting in the Ma'anshan Steel College (later Anhui University of Technology). He also completed a term as a visiting scholar to Appalachian State University in the United States.

In September 1994, he secured a job as a financial manager at the Baosteel Group in Shanghai. In 1998, he was named vice president and chief accountant of Baosteel Group. In 2000, he was named chief executive of the company. In April 2008, he was named head administrator of the Xingdao Development Zone of Shanghai.

On May 22, 2012, he was named a member of the municipal Party Standing Committee of Shanghai, ascending to sub-provincial level. By 2013, he was in charge of a number of experimental "zones" around the city, including the Shanghai Free Trade Zone, the Shanghai International Tourism Centre, and the Shanghai Tariff-Free Zone.

On November 10, 2015, Ai was placed under investigation by the Central Commission for Discipline Inspection of the Chinese Communist Party for "serious violations of regulations," the first official of his rank to come under scrutiny from Shanghai. His wife had died from illness only a week earlier. He was expelled from the Communist Party on January 19, 2016. The party's internal investigation concluded that Ai "violated political discipline", conspired against the investigation, did not honestly report his activities to the [investigating] organization, accepted gifts and cash, violated the Eight-point Regulation, frequented private clubs and "played golf", abused his power to aid in the business activities of others, facilitated transactions exchanging power for sex, and "illegally possessed public assets".

On April 28, 2017, Ai was sentenced to 17 years in prison, for taking some 43.21 million yuan (~$7.20 million) in bribes and plundering the public treasury worth 7.51 million yuan (~$1.09 million).
