= Lai Derong =

Chinese politician

- 赖德荣

Vice Chairman of the Guangxi Regional Committee of the Chinese People's Political Consultative Conference
- In office January 2013 – July 2016
- Chairman: Chen Jiwa

Communist Party Chief of Baise
- In office 23 August 2011 – 2 February 2013
- Preceded by: Liu Zhengdong
- Succeeded by: Peng Xiaochun

Communist Party Chief of Guigang
- In office August 2006 – August 2011
- Preceded by: Qin Yuantong
- Succeeded by: Wang Ke

Mayor of Guigang
- In office September 2009 – August 2006
- Preceded by: Xie Jianchen
- Succeeded by: Tang Chengliang

Personal details
- Born: July 1957 (age 69) Beihai, Guangxi Zhuang Autonomous Region, China
- Party: Chinese Communist Party (1976–2016; expelled)
- Education: Guangxi University for Nationalities; Guangxi Normal University

Lai Derong (simplified Chinese: 赖德荣; traditional Chinese: 賴德榮; pinyin: Laì Déróng; born July 1957) is a former Chinese politician who spent most of his career in southwest China's Guangxi Zhuang Autonomous Region. At the height of his career, he served as vice chairman of the Guangxi regional committee of the Chinese People's Political Consultative Conference (CPPCC). As of July 2016 he was under investigation by the Communist Party's anti-graft watchdog. Then he was expelled from the Party and removed from his post and will now serve as an ordinary member of government staff. On 21 September 2016, he was removed from membership of China's top political advisory body, the Chinese People's Political Consultative Conference. Eight days later, he was also removed from membership of the 12th Autonomous Regional People's Congress.

He was a delegate to the 17th and 18th National Congress of the Chinese Communist Party.

== Career ==
Lai was born in Beihai, Guangxi Zhuang Autonomous Region in July 1957. He entered the workforce in July 1974 and joined the Chinese Communist Party in January 1976. At the end of the Down to the Countryside Movement, he was a sent-down youth in Shangsi County. After the Cultural Revolution, he was deputy party chief of Baibao People's Commune. In October 1978 he entered Guangxi University for Nationalities, majoring in politics at the Department of Political Science, where he graduated in July 1982. He also graduated from Guangxi Normal University as a part-time student.

After graduation, he was assigned to the Organization Department of the Guangxi Committee of the Chinese Communist Party, and had worked there ever since, rising up through the ranks to serve as deputy director from October 1994 to June 1996. He was elected deputy party chief of Wuzhou in June 1996, and held that office until March 1997, when he was transferred to Hezhou and appointed the deputy party chief. In October 2002 he was appointed party group secretary of the Family Planning Committee of Guangxi Zhuang Autonomous Region, he also served as the director in April 2003. He became deputy party chief, acting mayor and vice-mayor of Guigang in July 2005, two months later, he was elevated to mayor. In August 2006 he was promoted again to become party chief, the top political position in the city, and served from 2006 to 2011. In August 2011, he became party chief of Baise, and served until February 2013. In January 2013, he rose to become vice chairman of the Guangxi regional committee of the Chinese People's Political Consultative Conference (CPPCC), a position he held for almost three years until he was placed under investigation for "serious violations of discipline" by the party's disciplinary body. He was stripped of his post and party membership in July 2016. On September 21, 2016, he was removed from his post as vice chairman of the Guangxi Regional Committee of the Chinese People's Political Consultative Conference, and will now serve as an ordinary member of government staff.

Government offices
Preceded by Xie Jianchen (谢建辰)	Mayor of Guigang; 2005–2006	Succeeded by Tang Chengliang (唐成良)
Party political offices
Preceded by Qin Yuantong (覃远通)	Communist Party Chief of Guigang; 2006–2011	Succeeded by Wang Ke (王可)
Preceded by Liu Zhengdong (刘正东)	Communist Party Chief of Baise; 2011–2013	Succeeded by Peng Xiaochun (彭晓春)
