= Gao Xiaoyan =

Chinese general

- 高小燕
- Born: 1957 (age 68–69); Shilou County, Shanxi, China
- Military career
- Allegiance: People's Republic of China
- Branch: People's Liberation Army Ground Force
- Service years: 1974–2014
- Rank: Major general
- Commands: Political Commissar and Discipline Inspection Secretary of the PLA Information Engineering University (2012–2014)

Gao Xiaoyan (Chinese: 高小燕; pinyin: Gāo Xiǎoyàn; born 1957) is a disgraced major general (shao jiang) in the People's Liberation Army of China. She successively served as political commissar and Discipline Inspection Secretary of the PLA Information Engineering University in Zhengzhou, and executive director of China Institute For Leadership Science (CILS). Investigated by the PLA's anti-graft agency in December 2014, She was the first female general to have been implicated in the anti-corruption campaign launched after the 18th Communist Party Congress.

== Life and career ==
Gao was born and raised in Shilou County, Shanxi province, near the city of Lüliang. In 1974, by age 17, she joined the People's Liberation Army and working in Lanzhou Military Region. In 1984, she was transferred to Xi'an, capital of Northwest China's Shaanxi province, and was assigned to the PLA Fourth Military Medical University. Twelve years later, she was transferred to Beijing with her husband and worked in PLA General Logistics Department. In 2005, she became the political commissar at the 309th Hospital of the PLA.

In 2012, she was transferred to Zhengzhou and appointed the political commissar and Discipline Inspection Secretary of the PLA Information Engineering University. In September 2012, she was elected executive director of China Institute For Leadership Science (CILS).

== Downfall ==
She was detained by the People's Liberation Army's prosecution organs on November 27, 2014.

Gao was the fifth military figure with rank of major general or above detained for investigation after the 18th Party Congress. After her downfall, Chinese media speculated on her links with a former general in charge of logistics, Gu Junshan and to Central Military Commission Vice Chairman Xu Caihou.
