= Fengfu =

Fengfu may refer to:

- Fengfu (風府) acupuncture point: wind palace
- Fengfu railway station, a railway station on the Taiwan Railways Administration Taichung line
- Fengfu Village (豐富里), Houlong, Miaoli, Taiwan
- Sui Fengfu (born 1956), a former Chinese agricultural official
- Tingalaw (豐富部落; Fengfu), a tribe in Fengbin Township, Hualien County, Taiwan
