= Wang Minggui =

Chinese general

- 王明贵
- Born: 1954 (age 71–72); Shangqiu, Henan, China
- Military career
- Allegiance: People's Republic of China
- Branch: People's Liberation Army
- Rank: Major general (Shao Jiang)
- Commands: Political Commissar of People's Liberation Army Air Force Command College (2008–2014)

Wang Minggui (Chinese: 王明贵; pinyin: Wáng Míngguì; born 1954) is a general in the People's Liberation Army of China. A native of Shangqiu, Henan, Wang obtained the rank of major general in 2004. He was investigated by the PLA's anti-graft agency in November 2013 and transferred to judicial organs in January 2014. He served as Deputy Political Commissar of People's Liberation Army Information Engineering University before serving as Political Commissar of People's Liberation Army Air Force Command College in 2008.
