= Yao Zhongmin =

Chinese economist (born 1952)

- 姚中民
- Born: June 1952 (age 74); Huaiyang County, Zhoukou, Henan, China
- Education: Dongbei University of Finance and Economics; Zhongnan University of Economics and Law
- Occupation: Economist
- Years active: 1985 - 2016
- Organization: China Development Bank (CDB)
- Political party: Chinese Communist Party (expelled)
- Relatives: Yao Zhongquan (brother)

Yao Zhongmin (Chinese: 姚中民; pinyin: Yáo Zhōngmín; born June 1952) is a Chinese economist who served as chairman of the board of supervisors at China Development Bank (CDB) from 2008 to 2013. He had also served as deputy chief of the Chinese Communist Party (CCP) committee at the CDB and vice governor of the bank. In June 2016 he was put under investigation for alleged "serious violations of discipline" by the Central Commission for Discipline Inspection (CCDI). He was soon removed from membership of the Chinese People's Political Consultative Conference. In September 2016 he had been expelled from the CCP and removed from public office. In October 2016 the Supreme People's Procuratorate announced that authorities were investigating accusations of corruption against him. In August 2017, he was sentenced to 14 years for accepting bribes by the Intermediate People's Court of Baoding City.

He was a member of the 17th National Congress of the Chinese Communist Party.

== Biography ==
Yao was born in June 1952 in Huaiyang County, Henan. In 1977 he graduated from Liaoning Institute of Finance and Economics (now Dongbei University of Finance and Economics). He became deputy governor of Henan branch of China Construction Bank in May 1985, and served until June 1992, when he was promoted to governor and Party Branch Secretary. In April 1993 he was appointed deputy governor of Henan province, and held that office until January 1994. Beginning in 1994, he served in various posts in China Development Bank (CDB) before serving as chairman of the board of supervisors in September 2008.

In early 2015, Yao was criticized by the Guizhou Provincial Commission for Discipline Inspection. On June 6, 2016, the Central Commission for Discipline Inspection (CCDI) said in a statement on its website that Yao has come under investigation for "serious violations of discipline". On June 24, Yao was removed from membership of China's top political advisory body, the Chinese People's Political Consultative Conference. In September 2016, he was stripped of his post and party membership. In October 2016, his case was handed over to the Supreme People’s Procuratorate. On August 4, 2017, he was sentenced to 14 years for accepting bribes by the Intermediate People's Court of Baoding City in north China's Hebei province, he was also fined 3.5 million yuan (about 520,000 U.S. dollars).

== Personal life ==
Yao has a brother, Yao Zhongquan.
