= Chen Tiexin =

Chinese politician

- 陈铁新

Vice Chairman of the Liaoning Provincial Committee of the Chinese People's Political Consultative Conference
- In office February 2013 – July 2014
- Chairman: Xia Deren

Communist Party Secretary of Chaoyang
- In office February 2008 – January 2013
- Preceded by: Song Yong
- Succeeded by: Wang Mingyu

Mayor of Dandong
- In office March 2004 – February 2008
- Preceded by: Jiang Zuoyong
- Succeeded by: Zhao Liansheng

Personal details
- Born: April 1955 (age 71) Liaoyang, Liaoning, China
- Party: Chinese Communist Party (1975–2014, expelled)
- Education: Jilin University; Central Party School of the Chinese Communist Party

Chinese name
- Traditional Chinese: 陳鐵新
- Simplified Chinese: 陈铁新
Transcriptions
Standard Mandarin
- Hanyu Pinyin: Chén Tiěxīn

Chen Tiexin (Chinese: 陈铁新; born April 1955) is a former Chinese politician. Between 2013 and 2014 Chen served as the vice chairman of the Liaoning Provincial Committee of the Chinese People's Political Consultative Conference, a largely ceremonial legislative consultation body. Prior to that he served as the mayor of Dandong and the party secretary of Chaoyang. Chen was placed under investigation by the Communist Party's anti-corruption body in May 2014, and was the first high-ranking official being examined from Liaoning province.

== Career ==
Chen was born and raised in Liaoyang, Liaoning, he earned a PhD in Economics degree from Jilin University in December 1995.

He got involved in politics in December 1972 and joined the Chinese Communist Party in March 1975.

During the Cultural Revolution, he worked in Heishan Village of Dengta County as a sent-down youth.

Beginning in 1983, he served in several posts in Shenyang, capital of Liaoning province, including general manager, director, and secretary of party committee.

He was appointed as the deputy party secretary and mayor of Dandong in March 2004, a position he held until February 2008, when he was transferred to Chaoyang as the party secretary. When he took office in Chaoyang, he wrote the lyrics for Fengming Chaoyang (Phoenix Singing in Chaoyang), a hit song sung by Chen Sisi.

In February 2013 he was promoted to become the vice chairman of the Liaoning Provincial Committee of the Chinese People's Political Consultative Conference.

== Downfall ==
On July 24, 2014, Chen was being investigated by the Central Commission for Discipline Inspection of the Chinese Communist Party for "serious violations of laws and regulations". On July 30, Chen was dismissed from his position by the government.

Chen Tiexin was expelled from the Communist Party on October 28, 2014. On November 22, 2016, Chen was sentenced to 13 years and 9 months in prison for bribery.

Government offices
Preceded by Jiang Zuoyong	Mayor of Dandong; 2004–2008	Succeeded by Zhao Liansheng
Party political offices
Preceded by Song Yong	Communist Party Secretary of Chaoyang; 2008–2013	Succeeded by Wang Mingyu
