= Yang Xiuzhu =

Former Chinese politician

Yang Xiuzhu 杨秀珠

Deputy Director of Zhejiang Construction Department
- In office 1998–2003

Deputy Mayor of Wenzhou
- In office 1995–1998

Personal details
- Born: 15 September 1946 (age 79) Wenzhou, Zhejiang
- Party: Chinese Communist Party (expelled)
- Children: 1
- Occupation: Politician

Yang Xiuzhu (simplified Chinese: 杨秀珠; traditional Chinese: 楊秀珠; pinyin: Yáng Xiùzhū; born September 15, 1946 (Note: Her ID number is 330302460915362, and 460915 is her birthdate.)) is a former Chinese female politician whose career ended after she was charged with corruption and expelled from the Chinese Communist Party. Yang served as Deputy Mayor of Wenzhou from 1995 to 1998 and deputy director of Zhejiang Construction Department from 1998 to 2003. After being charged with corruption, Yang evaded Chinese authorities and fled overseas in 2003. She had lived in many places, including Hong Kong, Singapore, France, the Netherlands, Italy and the United States, to avoid punishment. On November 16, 2016, Yang was deported to China and surrendered to Chinese authorities, and sentenced to eight years' imprisonment in October. She was described by several media outlets as "China's most wanted fugitive" and "China's first female corruption giant".

== Early life and political career ==
Yang was born in Wenzhou, Zhejiang on September 15, 1946. She was graduated from Yuying Primary School (育英小学). Later she studied in Middle School Department of Wenzhou Second High School, and she dropped out in 1960. In 1961, she became a waitress to start selling Baozi in grain store. During Cultural Revolution, she joined a rebel organization until the revolution is ended.

She was elected as the deputy director of Women's Federation of Wenzhou in 1977, and upgraded to the Deputy District Governor of Xicheng District of Wenzhou (now merged into Lucheng District) in 1981. In 1984, Yang was appointed as deputy director of City Construction Bureau of Wenzhou and Director of Planning of Wenzhou in 1989. In 1993 she appointed as the Assistant of Mayor of Wenzhou, and Deputy commander of Jinhua–Wenzhou Railway. Yang was appointed as Deputy Mayor of Wenzhou and deputy director of Zhejiang Construction Department in 1998.

== Evasion, capture, and aftermath ==
Yang evaded Chinese authorities and fled overseas from Shanghai on April 20, 2003, with her daughter, son-in-law and grandson. According to the Central Commission for Discipline Inspection, she stood accused of embezzling 250 million yuan ($36.3 million). Before that, Yang bought a 5-storey building in Manhattan in 1996. On May 13, 2003, Yang was investigated by a prosecutor. Subsequently, she was expelled from the Communist Party on June 23.

It was later discovered that Yang had lived in many different places, including Hong Kong, Singapore, France, the Netherlands, Italy and the United States, to avoid punishment. In 2005, she was detained by Dutch authorities. Yang had also applied to gain asylum in France and the Netherlands, but these applications had been rejected.

In 2014, Yang was detained in the United States for violations of immigration regulations. She tried to enter the country using a counterfeit Dutch passport. Later, Yang was detained in the correctional facility of Hudson County, New Jersey, according to the U.S. Immigration and Customs Enforcement. On September 28, 2014, Xinhua News Agency reported that Yang's extradition has been initiated. She was listed as one of the five most-wanted fugitives subject to "advanced negotiations" between China and the US as both sides attempted to speed up the extradition process.

In April 2015, the CCDI released China's 100 most-wanted fugitive list, in which Yang was ranked first. In June, Yang applied for political asylum in the United States while still detained. In July 2016, she cancelled her political asylum application and decided to accept the punishment from Chinese law enforcement "unconditionally".

Yang's driver, Yang Shenghua, had also been convicted of corruption in 2003 and fled to Germany. Yang Shenghua was the former husband of Hu Jie, the current wife of comedian Zhou Libo. Yang's brother, Yang Shenghua, was reprimanded in connection to her corruption case. Over one hundred officials linked to her network were investigated.

== Deport and trial ==
On November 16, 2016, Yang Xiuzhu took an American Airlines flight from Dallas to Beijing, and she was arrested upon her arrival. After arresting, she was going through immigration, escorted by two guards. She is the 37th fugitive that has returned after the fugitive list releasing. She was sentenced to 8 years' imprisonment by Hangzhou Intermediate Court, for bribery and corruption on October 13, 2017.
