= Zhang Wansong =

Chinese major general

- 张万松
- Born: April 1950 (age 76); Muce Township, Yiyang County, Henan
- Military career
- Allegiance: People's Republic of China
- Branch: People's Liberation Army Navy
- Service years: 1968–2015
- Rank: Major general
- Commands: Director of the Joint Logistics Department of Lanzhou Military Region

Zhang Wansong (simplified Chinese: 张万松; traditional Chinese: 張萬松; pinyin: Zhāng Wànsōng; born April 1950) is a major general of China's People's Liberation Army Navy. He served as Director and Chinese Communist Party Deputy Committee Secretary of the Joint Logistics Department of the Lanzhou Military Region. In August 2015, the PLA announced that he is under investigation for corruption.

== Life and career ==
Zhang was born and brought up in Muce Township of Yiyang County, in Henan province. He joined the People’s Liberation Army in Xinjiang in 1968, that same year, he joined the Chinese Communist Party in December.

He served in various posts in Urumqi Military District and Xinjiang Military District before serving as Director and Chinese Communist Party Deputy Committee Secretary of the Joint Logistics Department of Lanzhou Military Region.

On August 18, 2015, he was probed on suspicion of serious disciplinary violations by the Central Commission for Discipline Inspection of the Central Military Commission and has been transferred to the military procuratorates.
