= Lu Wucheng =

Chinese politician

Lu Wucheng 陆武成

Vice Chairman of the Standing Committee of the Gansu Provincial People's Congress
- In office January 2013 – January 2015

Communist Party Secretary of Lanzhou
- In office July 2008 – October 2012

Personal details
- Born: May 1953 (age 73) Qingcheng County, Gansu
- Party: Chinese Communist Party (1974–2015, expelled)
- Education: Central Party School of the Chinese Communist Party
- Occupation: Politician

Lu Wucheng (simplified Chinese: 陆武成; traditional Chinese: 陸武成; pinyin: Lù Wǔchéng; born May 1953) is a former Chinese official who spent most of his career in Gansu province. He was the vice Chairman of the Standing Committee of the Gansu Provincial People's Congress and Communist Party Secretary of Lanzhou. Lu also was the member of 12th National People's Congress. On January 23, 2015, Lu Wucheng was placed under investigation by the Communist Party's anti-corruption agency. He was the first high-ranking politician being examined from Gansu province after the 18th Party Congress in 2012.

== Career ==
Lu Wucheng was born and raised in Qingcheng County, Gansu. He joined Chinese Communist Party in 1974. He was the student of Lanzhou Public Security School (兰州市公安学校) and the policeman of Lanzhou Public Security Bureau. In 1996, Lu went to Jinchang, became the vice Communist Party Secretary and mayor. In July 2008, Lu Wucheng become Communist Party Secretary of Lanzhou. On January 29, 2013, he became the Vice Chairman of the Standing Committee of the Gansu Provincial People's Congress.

On January 23, 2015, Lu Wencheng was placed under investigation by the Central Commission for Discipline Inspection for "serious violations of laws and regulations". Lu was expelled from the Communist Party on May 15.

On November 17, 2016, Lu was sentenced to 12 years and 6 months in prison for bribery.

Party political offices
Preceded by Chen Baosheng	Communist Party Secretary of Lanzhou; 2008–2012	Succeeded by Yu Haiyan
