= Li Chengyun =

Chinese politician (born 1955)

- 李成云

Vice-Governor of Sichuan
- In office January 2008 – September 2011

Personal details
- Born: May 1955 (age 71) Guang'an, Sichuan
- Party: Chinese Communist Party (expelled)
- Education: University of Shanghai for Science and Technology

Li Chengyun (Chinese: 李成云; born May 1955) is a former Chinese politician who served as Vice-Governor of Sichuan from 2008 to 2011. He was convicted of corruption in 2017 (as part of an anti-corruption campaign under Xi Jinping) and sentenced to ten years in prison.

== Career ==
Li was born in Guang'an, Sichuan, China. He graduated from University of Shanghai for Science and Technology and joined the workforce in March 1974. Li was the director of Sichuan Machinery Industry Department and Chinese Communist Party Secretary of Deyang. In 2006, he became the director of Sichuan State Assets Committee. Li was promoted to the Vice-Governor of Sichuan in January 2008 and was dismissed in September 2011 for "serious violations of regulations". After two months, he was released and became the deputy director of Sichuan Decision Advisory Committee.

On April 9, 2016, Li was placed under investigation by the Central Commission for Discipline Inspection, the party's internal disciplinary body, for "serious violations of regulations". He was expelled from the Communist Party on July 26. On May 31, 2017, Li was sentenced to ten years in prison for taking bribes worth over 6.36 million yuan (US$958,000) by the Intermediate People's Court of Liupanshui. According to official Chinese media, one of Li's mistresses was a spy for two foreign countries.
