= Wang Shuaiting =

Chinese business executive

Wang Shuaiting 王帅廷
- Born: October 1955 (age 70); Feng County, Jiangsu
- Education: Xuzhou Normal University; China Europe International Business School
- Years active: 1982–2014
- Political party: Chinese Communist Party (expelled)

Wang Shuaiting (Chinese: 王帅廷; pinyin: Wáng Shuàitíng; born October 1955) is a former Chinese business executive. He worked in China Resources Power, China Resources and Hong Kong CTS Group (香港中旅集团) during his career. On May 16, 2014, Wang Shuaiting was placed under investigation by the Central Commission for Discipline Inspection.

== Career ==
Wang Shuaiting was born in Feng County, Jiangsu. He graduated from Xuzhou Normal University in 1982, and started to work in September 1982. Wang was the General Manager of Xuzhou China Resources Power Co., Ltd in 1994, and became the general manager of China Resources Power in 2001. In 2002, he joined the board of directors of China Resources, and become the vice-chairman of China Resources in 2009. In April 2011, Wang Shuaiting became the general manager and vice chairman of Hong Kong CTS Group.

On May 16, 2014, Wang Shuaiting was placed under investigation by the Central Commission for Discipline Inspection for "serious violations of laws and regulations". Wang Shuaiting was expelled from the Chinese Communist Party on September 11, 2015.

On February 28, 2017, Wang was sentenced to 16 years in prison for taking bribes worth 40.08 million yuan (~$5.83 million), plundering the public treasury worth 7.08 million yuan (~$1.03 million) in Shenzhen People's Intermediate Court.
