= Wei Jin =

Chinese general

- 卫晋
- Born: October 1959 (age 66–67); Linfen, Shanxi, China
- Military career
- Allegiance: People's Republic of China
- Branch: People's Liberation Army
- Rank: Major general
- Commands: Deputy Political Commissar of Tibet Military District (2011–2014)

Wei Jin
- Traditional Chinese: 衛晉
- Simplified Chinese: 卫晋
Transcriptions
Standard Mandarin
- Hanyu Pinyin: Weì Jìn

Wei Jin (born October 1959) is a general in the People's Liberation Army of China. He holds the rank of major general in the PLA. He began his political career in January 1977, and joined the Chinese Communist Party (CCP) in September 1978. As of April 2014 he was under investigation by the PLA's anti-corruption agency. Previously he served as Deputy Political Commissar of Tibet Military District.

== Life and career ==
Wei was born and raised in Linfen, Shanxi. He entered People's Liberation Army Second Artillery Engineering University in August 1978, and graduated in July 1982. And he was accepted to PLA National Defence University in August 1987. He worked in Chengdu Military Region and over a period of 15 years worked his way up to the position of Deputy Head of Publicity Section of Special Branch. He became Political Commissar of Suining Military District in August 2007, at the same time as holding the post of a Standing Committee of CCP Suining Committee between March 2009 to November 2011. Then he was promoted to become Deputy Political Commissar of Tibet Military District, a position he held until March 2014, while he was placed under investigation by the PLA's anti-corruption agency.
