= Chen Baihuai =

Chinese politician

- 陈柏槐

Vice-Chairman of the Hubei Provincial Committee of the Chinese People's Political Consultative Conference
- In office January 2009 – January 2013
- Chairman: Song Yuying; Yang Song

Personal details
- Born: August 1950 (age 76) Wuhan, Hubei, China
- Party: Chinese Communist Party (1973–2014; expelled)
- Education: Central China Normal University

Chen Baihuai (simplified Chinese: 陈柏槐; traditional Chinese: 陳柏槐; pinyin: Chén Baǐhuaí; born August 1950) is a former Chinese politician from Hubei province. At the height of his career, he served as the deputy chairman of the province's political advisory body. He was later detained and tried for corruption charges in 2014 and convicted.

== Career ==
Chen was born in Wuhan, Hubei in August 1950.

Chen joined the workforce in January 1971, working first as an agricultural technician in Xinzhou County. He joined the Chinese Communist Party in June 1973. He worked in the agriculture sector for most of his life.

Chen entered Central China Normal University in September 1982, majoring in economic administration, graduating in July 1985. After graduation, Chen worked in Wuhan as an officer.

In June 1997, he was promoted to become the deputy secretary general of Hubei People's Government, a position he held until February 2003. He was then named head of the provincial department of agriculture.

In January 2009, Chen was promoted to become the vice-chairman of the Hubei Provincial People's Political Consultative Conference, he remained in that position until January 2013.

== Downfall ==
On November 19, 2013, Chen was being investigated by the Central Commission for Discipline Inspection of the Chinese Communist Party for "serious violations of laws and regulations". The party investigation concluded that Chen directed subordinates who engaged in the misuse and misappropriation of state-owned lands, took bribes personally and through his family, and sought benefits for his associates. In September 2014, Chen was charged with abuse of power and bribery. His trial took place in the Intermediate People's Court in the coastal city of Fuzhou. Chen was sentenced to 17 years in prison.
