= Zhan Jun =

PLA army general

- 占俊
- Born: Hubei
- Military career
- Allegiance: People's Republic of China
- Branch: People's Liberation Army Ground Force
- Service years: ? – March 2015
- Rank: Major general
- Commands: Deputy commander of Hubei Military District

Zhan Jun (Chinese: 占俊; pinyin: Zhàn Jùn) is a Chinese major general in the People's Liberation Army (PLA). He was investigated by the PLA's anti-graft agency in December 2014. His case was handed over to military prosecutors in March 2015. He once served as head of the logistic department of Hubei Military District and deputy commander of Hubei Military District.
