= Zhang Qibin =

Chinese general

- 张祁斌
- Born: November 1953 (age 72); Shen County, Hebei, China
- Military career
- Allegiance: People's Republic of China
- Branch: People's Liberation Army
- Rank: Major general
- Commands: Deputy Chief of Staff of the Jinan Military Region (2010–2014)

Zhang Qibin
- Traditional Chinese: 張祁斌
- Simplified Chinese: 张祁斌
Transcriptions
Standard Mandarin
- Hanyu Pinyin: Zhāng Qíbīn

Zhang Qibin (born November 1953) is a former major general in the People's Liberation Army of China. In August 2014 he was placed under investigation by the PLA's anti-corruption agency. Previously he served as Deputy Chief of Staff of the Jinan Military Region, one of seven military districts located in the east of China.

== Life and career ==
Zhang was born and raised in Shen County (currently Shenzhou city), Hebei. In December 2001 he was promoted to become commander of the 26th Army, a position he held until July 2003. Then he was promoted again to become Deputy Chief of Staff of the North Sea Fleet. In May 2010, he appointed the Deputy Chief of Staff of the Jinan Military Region. In August 2014, he was placed under investigation by the PLA's anti-corruption agency. In November 2014, he was transferred to judicial organs.
