= Guangxi Minzu University =

Provincial research university in Nanning, Guangxi, China

- 广西民族大学 (Mandarin Chinese) • Gvangjsih Minzcuz Dayoz (Zhuang)
- Former names: Guangxi University for Nationalities; Central Institute for Nationalities (Guangxi)
- Motto: 厚德博学、和而不同
- Motto in English: Depth In Learning, Harmony Over Uniformity
- Type: Public
- Established: 1952; 74 years ago
- President: Wei Shizhen
- Party Secretary: Tang Qiuping
- Academic staff: 2,500
- Undergraduates: about 66,000
- Postgraduates: about 7,000
- Other students: 324 high school and pre-university students
- Location: Nanning, Guangxi, China
- Campus: Urban
- Colors: Red; Blue; Green
- Website: www.gxmzu.edu.cn

Guangxi Minzu University (simplified Chinese: 广西民族大学; traditional Chinese: 廣西民族大學, Zhuang: Gvangjsih Minzcuz Dayoz, abbreviated GXMZU) is a provincial research university in Nanning, Guangxi. Established in 1952 to serve the ethnic minority populations in Guangxi, the university has historical strengths in ethnology and foreign languages.

Originally a branch campus of the Central Institute for Nationalities, the university has evolved into an independent university which grants bachelor's, master's, and doctoral degrees across 26 colleges, academic departments, and professional schools. Half of its 16,000 students are classified as an ethnic minority, with representation from 53 out of 55 recognized ethnic minority groups including the Zhuang, Miao, Yao, and Yi peoples. The university also attracts a growing population of over 1,000 international students, bolstered by its College of International Education and numerous global academic partnerships with educational institutions across Southeast and South Asia.

== History ==
The university was founded in 1952 as the Guangxi branch of the Central Institute for Nationalities (now the Minzu University of China). The following year, the branch campus was upgraded into an independent institution, the Guangxi Provincial Institute for Nationalities. In 1958, the institution was renamed the Guangxi College for Nationalities.

In 2006, the Chinese Ministry of Education approved the university's proposal to be renamed the Guangxi Minzu University.

In 2013, the university received approval to grant its first doctoral degrees, in the areas of ethnology, Chinese language and literature, and foreign languages and literature. In 2014, the university began recruiting the inaugural group of doctoral students.

The institution has graduated over 200,000 students in total, 50 percent of whom belong to recognized ethnic minority groups, and also including 12,000 international students.

== Academics and research ==
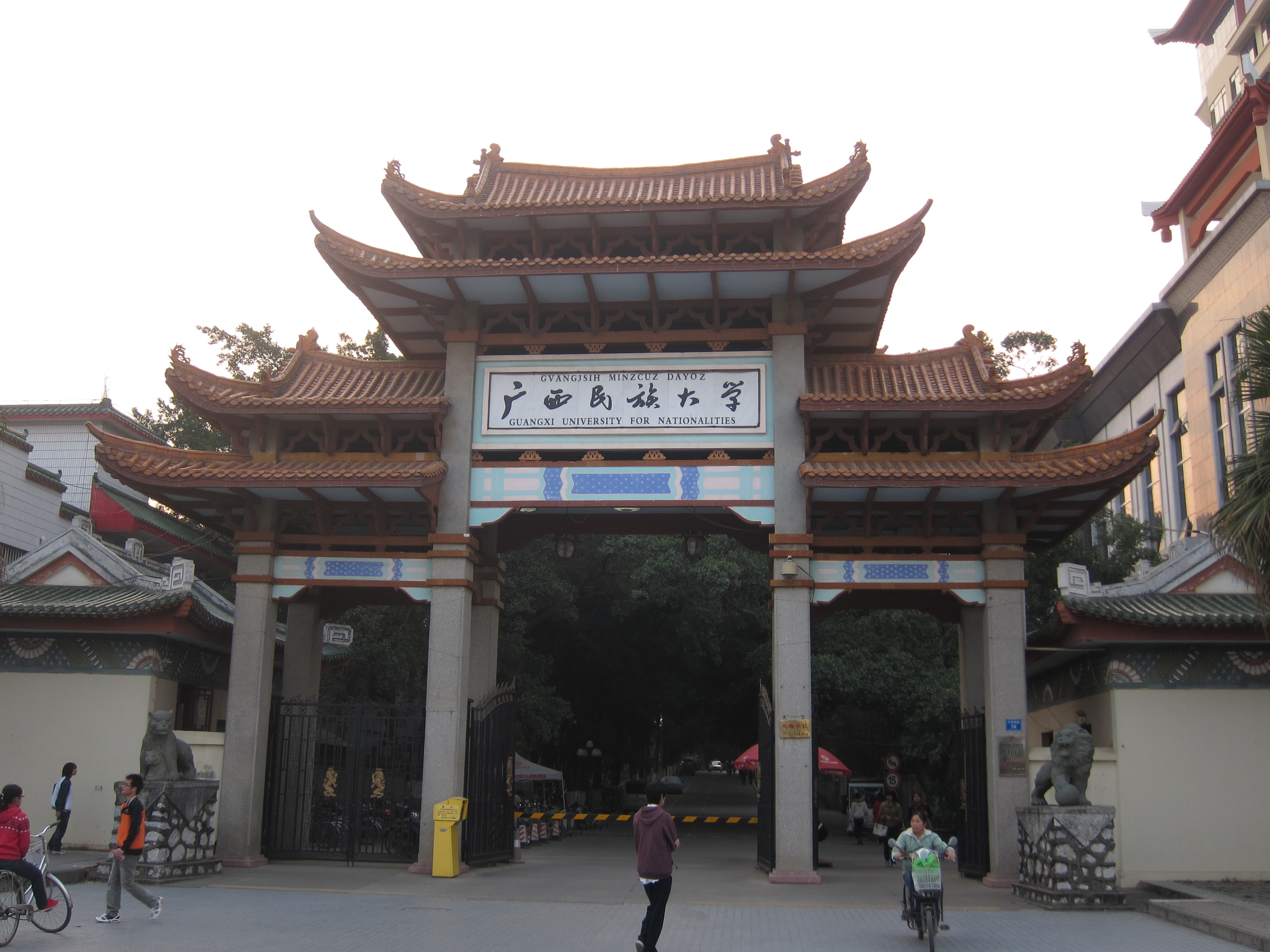
Entrance gate on the campus of Guangxi Minda

Guangxi Minda has a student body of approximately 16,000, with 33 undergraduate majors ranging from the arts and economics to science and engineering.

The university has become a national research center on nationalities and cultures, especially the ethnic groups in the Guangxi Zhuang Autonomous Region and in Southeast Asian countries.

Long-term cooperation relationships have been formed between the university and local enterprises to transfer its latest research results and high technology developments into industrialization.

== International collaboration ==
Guangxi Minzu University has historically proclaimed a tripartite focus of "民族性、区域性、国际性" ("national, regional, international") and has forged academic and cultural exchange partnerships with 137 educational institutions in 17 countries.

The university is the host institution for the Confucius Institutes established at Mahasarakham University in Thailand, Tanjungpura University in Indonesia, and the National University of Laos at Vientiane, Laos.

Additionally, the university is among a group of institutions authorized to receive international students who have been awarded a Confucius Institute Scholarship by the Hanban government agency.

The university has a partnership with the Thai Ministry of Education concerning Thai foreign language training.
