= Fu Xiaoguang =

Chinese politician

- 付晓光

Vice-Governor of Heilongjiang
- In office January 2003 – October 2004
- Leader: Zhang Zuoji (governor)

Personal details
- Born: February 1952 (age 74) Zhaoyuan County, Heilongjiang, China
- Party: Chinese Communist Party
- Education: Jilin University of Technology

Fu Xiaoguang (simplified Chinese: 付晓光; traditional Chinese: 付曉光; pinyin: Fù Xiǎoguāng; born February 1952) is a Chinese politician from Heilongjiang province. He served as vice-governor of Heilongjiang between 2003 and 2004. He was demoted and admonished by party authorities in 2013 for spending public funds on a banquet, during which one of his drinking partners reportedly died from overconsumption of alcohol.

== Biography ==
Fu was born in Zhaoyuan County, Heilongjiang in February 1952.

Fu became involved in politics in October 1968 and he joined the Chinese Communist Party in September 1973.

Fu entered Jilin University of Technology in 1973, majoring in design and manufacturer, where he graduated in 1977. After graduation, he worked as an officer in Heilongjiang.

In 1995 he was promoted to become the Chief of Heilongjiang Provincial Communications Department, a position he held until 1999.

Fu was elevated to the vice-governor of Heilongjiang in January 2003; he resigned in October 2004 for serious violation. Beginning in 2010 he served as the chair of the Heilongjiang Table Tennis Association, a largely ceremonial role which gave him sub-provincial level official status. Starting in 2012 he was put in charge of a provincial tourism development project.

== Downfall ==
On December 17, 2013, Fu was placed on "one-year probation" within the Chinese Communist Party for public consumption of alcohol. Fu reportedly spend a large amount of public funds on a banquet he hosted. One of the attendees died and another was seriously harmed due to overconsumption of alcohol. Fu was subsequently demoted one level from a sub-provincial official to the bureau-level.
