= Zhan Guoqiao =

Chinese soldier

- 占国桥
- Born: December 1953 (age 72); Xiaoshan District, Hangzhou, Zhejiang, China
- Military career
- Allegiance: People's Republic of China
- Branch: People's Liberation Army Ground Force
- Service years: 1960s–2015
- Rank: Major general
- Commands: Head of the Joint Logistics Department of Lanzhou Military Region

Zhan Guoqiao (simplified Chinese: 占国桥; traditional Chinese: 占國橋; pinyin: Zhàn Guóqiáo; born December 1953) is a major general in the People's Liberation Army (PLA). As of December 2014 he was under investigation by the PLA's anti-corruption agency. He was transferred to the military procuratorates in March 2015. In August 2015, he was removed from membership of China's top parliamentary body, the National People's Congress.

== Life and career ==
Born in Xiaoshan District of Hangzhou city, in Zhejiang province, in December 1953, Zhan Guoqiao joined the People's Liberation Army in 1960s during the Cultural Revolution. After graduating from PLA Military Economics Academy, he was assigned to the People's Liberation Army General Logistics Department in 1978.

At the end of 2001, he was transferred to Lanzhou Military Region, he once served as its Political Commissar and Head of the Joint Logistics Department.

In December 2014, he was put under investigation for alleged "serious violations of discipline and laws." In March 2015, his case was handed over to military prosecutors.
