= Dong Mingxiang =

Chinese major general

- 董明祥
- Born: September 1953 (age 73); Leiguan Town, Lai'an County, Anhui, China
- Military career
- Allegiance: People's Republic of China
- Branch: People's Liberation Army Ground Force
- Service years: 1969–2015
- Rank: Major general
- Commands: Head of the Joint Logistics Department of Beijing Military Region

Dong Mingxiang (Chinese: 董明祥; pinyin: Dǒng Míngxiáng; born September 1953) is a Chinese major general in the People's Liberation Army. As of March 2015 he was put under investigation for alleged "serious violations of discipline and laws."

== Life and career ==
Born in Leiguan Town of Lai'an County, Anhui, in September 1953, Dong Mingxiang joined the People's Liberation Army in December 1969, and six months later, he joined the Chinese Communist Party.

From 1973 to 1975 he studied at Hebei Institute of Geology (now Shijiazhuang University of Economics), majoring in geology. From 1995 to 1998 he studied at PLA Engineering College. He also studied at PLA National Defence University as a part-time student in 1998.

Dong Mingxiang was promoted to the rank of Major General (Shao Jiang) in 2001.

In July 2005 he was promoted to become Head of the Joint Logistics Department of Beijing Military Region, a position he held until 2015.

In April 2015 Chinese military authorities announced he was one of three military officers to be detained, amid allegations of corruption.
