= Mao Xiaofeng =

Chinese banking executive (born 1972)

Mao Xiaofeng 毛晓峰
- Born: 1972 (age 53–54); Wuhan, Hubei, China
- Education: Hunan University; Harvard Kennedy School
- Occupation: President of Minsheng Banking Corp (2014–2015)
- Years active: 1991–2015
- Political party: Chinese Communist Party

Mao Xiaofeng
- Traditional Chinese: 毛曉峰
- Simplified Chinese: 毛晓峰
Transcriptions
Standard Mandarin
- Hanyu Pinyin: Máo Xiǎofēng

Mao Xiaofeng (Chinese: 毛晓峰; born 1972) is a Chinese banking executive, best known for his tenure as a senior executive of Minsheng Banking Corp. In January 2015, Mao abruptly resigned as president of Minsheng Bank for "personal reasons"; it was reported that he was undergoing investigation by the Central Commission for Discipline Inspection, with suspected links to disgraced official Ling Jihua.

== Career ==
Mao was a child prodigy. Mao went to business school at Hunan University in Changsha and graduated in 1990 at age 18. He became the head of the student association at the university with the title of "Chairman", earning him the nickname "Chairman Mao". He then became assistant to the county governor of the Zhijiang Dong Autonomous County. He became deputy party secretary at age 23.

While working at the county party organization, Mao earned an MBA from Hunan University, and then a doctorate several years later. In 1999, Mao was transferred to the Communist Youth League headquarters in Beijing, and became a member of its General Office. During his time at the Youth League he earned a Master of Public Administration degree at Harvard Kennedy School.

He entered Minsheng Bank in 2002, and worked as deputy chief of staff to the president of the bank. In June 2003 he became secretary of the board of directors of the bank. In April 2008 he was promoted to vice president and head of retail banking. On August 18, 2014, Mao was named president of the bank. He was 42 at the time of his appointment, making him the youngest chief executive in the bank's 18-year history.

Mao abruptly resigned in late January 2015. The decision was publicly announced by a company spokesperson, who cited "personal reasons," and said that Mao's resignation did not concern the "operations of the bank." On January 31, 2014, it was announced that Mao was detained and undergoing investigation by the Central Commission for Discipline Inspection.

It was widely believed that Mao was investigated in connection with the case surrounding former General Office of the Chinese Communist Party head Ling Jihua, who was detained in December 2014. Ling and Mao attended Hunan University's MBA program at around the same time, and Mao reportedly worked for Ling at the Communist Youth League. The Beijing News also reported that Mao had set up a so-called "wives club" at the bank, whereby the bank granted positions which "offered salaries for no work" to the wives of high officials, including Gu Liping, the wife of Ling Jihua, and Yu Lifang, the wife of Su Rong.
