= Zhang Daixin =

Chinese general

- 张代新
- Born: China
- Military career
- Allegiance: People's Republic of China
- Branch: People's Liberation Army
- Rank: Major general (Shao Jiang)
- Commands: Deputy Commander of Heilongjiang Military District (2012–2014)

Zhang Daixin
- Traditional Chinese: 張代新
- Simplified Chinese: 张代新
Transcriptions
Standard Mandarin
- Hanyu Pinyin: Zhāng Daìxīn

Zhang Daixin is a general in the People's Liberation Army of China. Zhang holds the rank of major general in the PLA. He was investigated by the PLA's anti-graft agency in December 2014. Zhang served as Deputy Commander of Heilongjiang Military District from 2012 to 2014, previously he was the director of the Logistics Department of the 16th Army.
