= Liu Lizu =

Chinese politician

Liu Lizu (Chinese: 刘礼祖; born July 1955) is a provincial Chinese politician from Jiangxi province. Between 2012 and 2016, he served as the vice-chairman of the Jiangxi Committee of the Chinese People's Political Consultative Conference. He was expelled from the Chinese Communist Party and demoted after a party investigation.

Born in Yifeng County, Jiangxi, he joined the Communist Party in 1978, and completed two degrees from the Central Party School. He had a long career as a government official, serving as the mayor of Fuzhou, Jiangxi, the deputy head of the Jiangxi Economic and Trade Commission, and the director of the provincial bureau managing small to medium-sized businesses. Beginning in March 2004 he served as the director of the Jiangxi Department of Forestry. Beginning in 2008 he became a deputy to the National People's Congress.

In January 2016, Liu was removed from his position, thought to be implicated in the corruption case surrounding former Jiangxi party chief Su Rong. He was expelled from the Communist Party and demoted to keyuan. At the time of his demotion, he was at the retirement age for sub-provincial level anyway, so this amounted to essentially a loss of retirement benefits accorded to his rank; the demotion was especially severe as keyuan is the lowest level in the Chinese civil service hierarchy, roughly equivalent to an entry-level position.
