= Zhu Zuoli =

Chinese politician

Zhu Zuoli 祝作利

Vice-Chairman of Shaanxi Provincial Committee of the Chinese People's Political Consultative Conference
- In office January 2013 – February 2014
- Chairman: Ma Zhongping

Director of the Shaanxi Development and Reform Commission
- In office March 2008 – January 2013

Personal details
- Born: January 1955 (age 71) Xiayi County, Henan
- Party: Chinese Communist Party (expelled)
- Education: Northwest University; Northwestern Polytechnical University
- Occupation: Politician
- Profession: Economics

Zhu Zuoli (Chinese: 祝作利; pinyin: Zhù Zuólì; born January 1955) is a former Chinese politician who spent most of his career in Shaanxi Province. Zhu was the Director of the Shaanxi Provincial Development and Reform Commission between 2008 and 2013, a department with broad powers over the provincial economy, and then the vice-chairman of the provincial People's Political Consultative Conference (Zhengxie), a mostly ceremonial legislative consultation body. He was placed under investigation for corruption by the Communist Party's internal anti-corruption agency in February 2014, and dismissed from his positions. In 2015, he was sentenced to 11 years in prison for bribery.

== Biography ==
Zhu was born in Xiayi County, Henan in January 1955. He graduated from Northwest University in Xi'an, majoring in economics. He returned to his home county in 1973 to become a middle school teacher at Liulou School Between 1976 and 1977 he performed manual labour at a commune in Chang'an County, Shaanxi. He spent the next year at a factory in Xi'an. He received his masters political economics degree from Northwestern Polytechnical University and graduated in 1982. Zhu joined the Chinese Communist Party in July 1986.

After the reform and opening up, Zhu worked as an officer in Shaanxi Economic and Trade Commission. Zhu worked as Deputy Secretary General of the Shaanxi government between December 2002 to February 2006; by June 2005 he was made a full department-level official.

In February 2006, Zhu was promoted to become the vice-chairman of Shaanxi Development and Reform Commission; he rose further through the ranks to become director of the Shaanxi Development and Reform Commission, a department with power to approve a wide range of capital projects in the province, in March 2008.

In January 2013, Zhu was transferred to become Vice Chairman of the Shaanxi Provincial Committee of the Chinese People's Political Consultative Conference; while this was technically a promotion, given that the provincial Development and Reform Commission played an outsize role in the provincial economy, this was in reality a transfer away from the center of power.

On February 19, 2014, it was announced that Zhu was undergoing investigation by the Central Commission for Discipline Inspection of the Chinese Communist Party for "serious violations of laws and regulations". On August 6, 2014, the CCDI announced Zhu's expulsion from the Communist Party. He was accused of taking bribes personally and through his son, and his case moved to judicial proceedings.

The Langfang Intermediate People's Court in Hebei province took on Zhu's case in July 2015. Zhu was convicted of taking bribes worth approximately 8.55 million yuan (~$1.38 million), including accepting a gift of a Honda CR-V from a corporate executive, as well as accepting a $10 million Hong Kong dollar cash gift in the Diaoyutai State Guesthouse in Beijing in exchange for supporting the promotion of an associate. On November 19, 2015, Zhu was sentenced 11 years in jail for taking bribes.

Government offices
| Previous: Li Xiaodong | Director of Shaanxi Development and Reform Commission; March 2008 – January 2013 | Next: Fang Weifeng |
