= Zhu Fushou =

Chinese business executive

- 朱福寿
- Born: October 1962 (age 63); Tongcheng, Anhui, China
- Education: Hefei University of Technology; Zhongnan University of Economics and Law
- Occupation: General Manager of Dongfeng Motor (July 2001 – November 2015)
- Years active: 1994–2015
- Political party: Chinese Communist Party (1984–2015, expelled)

Zhu Fushou (simplified Chinese: 朱福寿; traditional Chinese: 朱福壽; pinyin: Zhū Fúshòu; born October 1962) is a former Chinese business executive who served as General Manager of Dongfeng Motor, a Chinese automobile manufacturer. On November 2, 2015, Zhu was placed under investigation by the Communist Party's anti-corruption agency.

== Career ==
Zhu Fushou was born in Tongcheng, Anhui in October 1962. He graduated from Hefei University of Technology in 1984 and Zhongnan University of Economics and Law in 2001.

Zhu was joined Chinese Communist Party in 1984. He went to Dongfeng Motor and became the General Manager of Dongfeng Motor Wheel Co., Ltd. (東風汽車車輪有限公司) in 1994. Since July 2001, Zhu Fushou became the General Manager of Dongfeng Motor. Zhu also was the member of the 11th Hubei People's Congress.

On November 2, 2015, Zhu Fushou was placed under investigation by the Central Commission for Discipline Inspection of the Chinese Communist Party, the party's internal disciplinary body, for "serious violations of regulations". At the same day, Dongfeng Motor's stock price fell 1.4 per cent to 11.08 Hong Kong dollars in Hong Kong.

On January 29, 2016, the CCDI announced Zhu was expelled from the party and demoted.
