= Liu Zhanqi =

Chinese police officer

- 刘占琪

Chief of the People's Armed Police Transportation Command
- In office July 2012 – December 2014
- Preceded by: Wang Cheng
- Succeeded by: Fu Ling

Personal details
- Born: December 1956 (age 69) Dingzhou, Hebei, China
- Party: Chinese Communist Party
- Education: PLA National Defence University; National University of Defense Technology

Military service
- Allegiance: People's Republic of China
- Branch/service: People's Armed Police
- Years of service: 1973–2015
- Rank: Major general

Liu Zhanqi (simplified Chinese: 刘占琪; traditional Chinese: 劉佔琪; pinyin: Lií Zhànqí; born December 1956) is a former officer of the Chinese People's Armed Police. He was investigated by the Commission for Discipline Inspection of the Central Military Commission (CMCCDI) in November 2014 and his case was handed over to military prosecutors in May 2015. Previously he served as chief of the People's Armed Police transportation command.

Liu worked for a long time on logistics and infrastructure projects for the Chinese Armed Police, and he is the first provincial-level Armed Police official to be placed under investigation. On June 17, 2015, the Central Military Commission (CMC) announced in a brief notice that Kou Tie and Liu Zhanqi were placed under investigation in November and their cases forwarded to prosecutors last month. So far, 37 PLA officials of deputy corps level and above have been put under corruption probes since CMC Chairman Xi Jinping's continues an anti-graft dragnet at all levels of government, military and ruling Chinese Communist Party.

== Biography ==
Liu was born in Dingzhou, Hebei in December 1956. He enlisted in the People's Armed Police in December 1973 by age 17, three years before the Cultural Revolution ended. Beginning in March 1980, he served in several posts in the Logistics Department of the People's Armed Police of Xinjiang Uyghur Autonomous Region, including administrative assistant, deputy director, and director. In September 1985 he entered Ürümqi Institute of Education, majoring in Chinese language and literature. In December 1992 he became deputy chief of the Logistics Department of the People's Armed Police of Xinjiang Uyghur Autonomous Region. In February 1998 he was accepted to PLA National Defence University as a part-time student. One year later he was promoted to the Chief position. During his tenure, he studied at National University of Defense Technology in Xi'an, capital of northwest China's Shaanxi province. He was chief of the People's Armed Police Audit Bureau in April 2005, and held that office until November 2008, when he rose to become deputy chief of the Logistics Department of the People's Armed Police. In July 2012, he was appointed chief of the People's Armed Police traffic command, a sprawling body with broad responsibilities for internal security, disaster relief and other duties, he remained in that position until December 2014, when he was placed under investigation last month. His case was handed over to the judiciary for prosecution in May 2015.

Military offices
Previous: Wang Cheng (王成)	Chief of the People's Armed Police Transportation Command; 2012–2014	Next: Fu Ling (傅凌)
