= Yu Haiyan =

Chinese politician

- 虞海燕

Vice Governor of Gansu
- In office November 2016 – January 2017

Communist Party Secretary of Lanzhou
- In office October 2012 – November 2016
- Preceded by: Lu Wucheng
- Succeeded by: Li Rongcan (李荣灿)

Personal details
- Born: July 1961 (age 65) Yiwu, Zhejiang, China
- Party: Chinese Communist Party (1987–2017, expelled)
- Education: Xi'an University of Architecture and Technology

Yu Haiyan (Chinese: 虞海燕; pinyin: Yú Hǎiyàn; born July 1961) is a former Chinese official. At the height of his career, he served as the Vice Governor of Gansu and Communist Party Secretary of Lanzhou. On January 11, 2017, Yu was placed under investigation by the Communist Party's anti-corruption agency. He was the second high-ranking politician being examined from Gansu province after the 18th Party Congress in 2012.

== Career ==
Yu Haiyan was born in Yiwu, Zhejiang. He joined Chinese Communist Party in 1987. Before his political career, he worked for Jiuquan Steel. In 1996, Lu went to Tianshui to become the Communist Party Secretary there. In 2011, Yu Haiyan became the Vice Governor of Gansu. In 2012, he became the Communist Party Secretary of Lanzhou. In 2016, he appointed as the Vice Governor of Gansu again.

On January 11, 2017, Yu Haiyan was placed under investigation by the Central Commission for Discipline Inspection of the Chinese Communist Party for "serious violations of laws and regulations". He was the second consecutive serving Lanzhou party chief to fall under the axe of the anti-corruption campaign, after Lu Wucheng, his immediate predecessor. He was expelled from the party on June 4, 2017.

On July 18, 2018, Yu was sentenced to 15 years in prison and fined six million yuan for taking bribes worth 65.63 million yuan by the Chongqing First Intermediate People's Court.

Party political offices
Preceded by Lu Wucheng	Communist Party Secretary of Lanzhou; 2012–2016	Succeeded by Li Rongcan (李荣灿)
