= Toyotomi (disambiguation) =

Toyotomi may refer to:

- Toyotomi clan, a clan in the 16th century Japan, including
  - Toyotomi Hideyoshi
  - Toyotomi Hideyori
  - Chikurin-in
  - Asahihime
  - Kodai-in
  - Yodo-dono
  - Oeyo
  - Toyotomi Hidetsugu
  - Toyotomi Hidenaga
  - Toyotomi Hidekatsu
  - Toyotomi Kunimatsu
- Toyotomi, Hokkaidō, a town in Hokkaidō
- Toyotomi, Yamanashi, a former village in Yamanashi Prefecture
