= Li Wenke =

Chinese politician

- 李文科

Vice-Chairman of the Liaoning People's Congress
- In office January 2013 – February 2017
- Chairman: Li Xi

Personal details
- Born: July 1956 (age 70) Suizhong County, Liaoning
- Party: Chinese Communist Party (expelled)
- Education: Shenyang Agricultural University; Central Party School

Li Wenke (Chinese: 李文科; pinyin: Lǐ Wénkē; born July 1956) is a former Chinese politician who served as vice-chairman of the Liaoning People's Congress. He was investigated in February 2017 by the Chinese Communist Party's anti-graft agency, suspected of corruption.

== Career ==
Li was born in Suizhong County, Liaoning. He joined the workforce in 1974, and became a member of the Communist Party in 1985. From 1978 to 1982, he studied in Shenyang Agricultural University. Li became the Director of Department of Agriculture of Liaoning in 1998, and became the Mayor of Yingkou in 2001. In 2004, he served as the Party Secretary of Tieling. Li was appointed as vice-chairman of the Liaoning People's Congress in 2012.

On February 28, 2017, Li Wenke was suspected of "serious violations of party discipline", and placed under investigation by the Central Commission for Discipline Inspection (CCDI). On May 10, 2017, Li was expelled from the Communist Party.

On September 13, 2018, Li was sentenced on 16 years in prison and fined three million yuan for taking bribes worth 36.59 million yuan and giving bribes worth 1.86 million yuan by the Intermediate People's Court in Tonghua.
