= Bai Xueshan =

Chinese politician

Bai Xueshan 白雪山

Vice Chairman of Ningxia
- In office January 2013 – November 2015

Party Secretary of Wuzhong
- In office September 2007 – January 2013

Mayor of Yinchuan
- In office January 2006 – September 2007

Personal details
- Born: May 1961 (age 65) Wuqi County, Shaanxi
- Party: Chinese Communist Party (1984–2015, expelled)
- Education: Central Party School of the Chinese Communist Party
- Occupation: Politician

Bai Xueshan (Chinese: 白雪山; born May 1961) is a former Chinese politician. He was the Vice Chairman of Ningxia since 2013. On November 6, 2015, Bai was placed under investigation by the Central Commission for Discipline Inspection. He was the first provincial-ministerial level official being examined from Ningxia after the 18th National Congress of the Chinese Communist Party in 2012. In 2017, Bai was sentenced to 15 years in prison for bribery.

== Career ==
Bai Xueshan was born in Wuqi County, Shaanxi in May 1961. His name, "Xueshan", roughly means "snow mountain". In 1984, he was graduated from Central Party School of the Chinese Communist Party and went to work in Yinchuan Suburban Second Construction Company (银川市郊区第二建筑工程公司). He then served successively as the liaison of the Yinchuan government in Shanghai, the governor and Chinese Communist Party Committee Secretary of the Suburban District of Yinchuan, the party chief of Helan County, and vice mayor of Yinchuan; and Bai became the mayor of Yinchuan from January 2006 to September 2007.

In 2007 Bai Xueshan was transferred to Wuzhong, another city in Ningxia, to become the Party Secretary of that city. In Wuzhong, local residents nicknamed him "Bai Luanchai" (白乱拆; literally, "Bai who arbitrarily tears things down"), due to his tendencies to raze various parts of town to make way for new construction. Since 2013, Bai became the Vice Chairman of Ningxia (since Ningxia is an autonomous region, the chairman is equivalent of a provincial governor). Bai was said to have been involved in real estate development during his career.

On November 6, 2015, Bai was placed under investigation by the Central Commission for Discipline Inspection of the Chinese Communist Party for "serious violations of regulations". On December 28, Bai was expelled from the party. The investigation concluded that Bai had "shallow sense of the duties of a party member", long took part in "superstitious activities", accepted bribes, and promoted the business interests of his relatives and associates.

On April 28, 2017, Bai was sentenced to 15 years in prison, for taking some 38.87 million yuan (~$6.48 million) in bribes.
