= Zhou Minggui =

Chinese major general

- 周明贵
- Born: January 1957 (age 69); Taixing, Jiangsu
- Military career
- Allegiance: People's Republic of China
- Branch: People's Liberation Army
- Service years: 1976–2015
- Rank: Major general
- Commands: Deputy Director of the Political Department of Nanjing Military Region

Zhou Minggui (simplified Chinese: 周明贵; traditional Chinese: 周明貴; pinyin: Zhōu Míngguì; born January 1957) is a Chinese major general in the People's Liberation Army. He earned the rank of major general in July 2007. He was deputy director of the Political Department of Nanjing Military Region before he was placed under investigation by the PLA's anti-corruption agency. In May 2015, he was transferred to the military procuratorates.

Zhou is the third highest-ranking officer sacked for graft in 2015 in the Nanjing Military Region.

== Life and career ==
Born in Fenjie Town of Taixing, in Jiangsu province, in January 1957. He joined the People's Liberation Army in December 1976, and later joined the Chinese Communist Party.

He served in various posts in Nanjing Military Region before serving as director of the Political Department of the 12th Army in May 2008. He was promoted to deputy political commissar in October 2006, and served until June 2010.

He was promoted to the rank of major general (Shao Jiang) in July 2007.

In June 2010, he was appointed political commissar of the Joint Logistics Department of the Nanjing Military Region, and later became its deputy director of the Political Department.

He was detained and put under investigation on suspicion of bribery by military authorities in January 2015 and was transferred to the military procuratorates in May 2015.
