= Deng Ruihua =

Chinese army officer

- 邓瑞华
- Born: February 1954 (age 72); Liangzhou District, Wuwei, Gansu, China
- Military career
- Allegiance: People's Republic of China
- Branch: People's Liberation Army Ground Force
- Service years: 1972–2015
- Rank: Major general
- Commands: Political Commissar of the Joint Logistics Department of Lanzhou Military Region

Deng Ruihua (simplified Chinese: 邓瑞华; traditional Chinese: 鄧瑞華; pinyin: Dèng Ruìhuá; born February 1954) is a Chinese major general in the People's Liberation Army. He served as Political Commissar of the Joint Logistics Department of Lanzhou Military Region from April 2010 to March 2014. On July 10, 2015, the PLA announced that he has been transferred to the military procuratorates.

== Life and career ==
Born in Liangzhou District of Wuwei city in Gansu province, in February 1954, he joined the People's Liberation Army in December 1972.

Beginning in 1972, he served in several posts in the 21st Army, including squad leader, platoon leader, company commander, battalion commander, and deputy regimental commander.

In September 1984, he was transferred to Lanzhou Military Region and appointed deputy regimental commander of its garrison regiment, he held that office until June 1986.

In July 1991 he was promoted to become Deputy Secretary General of its Political Department, a position he held until September 1995.

He served as Deputy Head of its Logistic Department of the 27th Division in 1995, and three years later promoted to the Head position.

He became its Deputy Political Commissar of the Joint Logistics Department in December 2005, rising to Political Commissar in April 2010.

At the beginning of 2015, Deng Ruihua was detained by Chinese military authorities. On July 10, 2015, he was transferred to the military procuratorates.
