= Jiang Zunyu =

Chinese politician

- 蒋尊玉

Secretary of the Shenzhen Municipal Political and Legal Commission
- In office April 2013 – October 2014
- Preceded by: Wang Huiming
- Succeeded by: Li Huanan

Communist Party Secretary of Longgang District
- In office October 2009 – April 2014
- Preceded by: Yu Weiliang
- Succeeded by: Yang Hong

Personal details
- Born: June 1957 (age 69) Feng County, Jiangsu, China
- Party: Chinese Communist Party (expelled)
- Spouse: Li Yan
- Children: 1
- Education: PLA Xi'an Political School

Jiang Zunyu (born June 1957) is a former Chinese politician, best known for his term as one of the top officials of the Special Economic Zone of Shenzhen. He held the title of Secretary of the Shenzhen Municipal Political and Legal Commission before his dismissal in 2014 on suspicion of corruption.

== Biography ==
Jiang was born and raised in Feng County, Jiangsu. He graduated from the Xi'an Political School of the People's Liberation Army. He then worked in a series of military construction projects. He got involved in politics in February 1976 and joined the Chinese Communist Party in July 1978. Jiang came to Shenzhen in the 1980s, when the city was becoming a boomtown from the creation of the Special Economic Zone in the area. Between 1989 and 1992 Jiang worked for the office overseeing the construction of the Shenzhen airport. In 1992 he joined the municipal land management bureau.

In August 2001, he entered the municipal government, becoming the deputy secretary-general, a position he held until July 2005. He became the Party Secretary of Longgang District in October 2009. He served there until April 2013, when he was appointed as the Secretary of the Shenzhen Municipal Politics and Law Commission, and joined the municipal Party Standing Committee, making him a full department-level official.

On October 13, 2014, state media reported that he was being investigated by the Central Commission for Discipline Inspection of the Chinese Communist Party for "serious violations of laws and regulations". The preliminary investigation into Jiang revealed that his family had acquired some 42 properties and owned financial assets in the form of cash and securities totalling over 200 million yuan (>$32 million).

Jiang Zunyu was expelled from the Communist Party on April 7, 2015, after an investigation by the CCDI. The investigation concluded that Jiang had abused his power to seek benefits for others in construction projects, received cash gifts, participated in gambling, and took large amounts of bribes personally and through his family.

Jiang's trial opened in May 2016. He was charged with taking bribes worth some 32 million yuan and 46 million Hong Kong dollars. He disputed the charges against him and said that he fabricated incriminating evidence in order to satisfy the interrogation of the disciplinary authorities; Jiang said, "to come up with all this pretext, it took me a whole week of work!" At court, Jiang only admitted to receiving an equivalent of 4 million yuan in bribes in the form of cash, a sports car, and some gold bars. On August 28, 2017, Jiang was sentenced to life in prison upon being convicted on charges of bribery; he appealed the sentence. The Higher People's Court of Guangdong rejected his appeal on June 21, 2019.

Party political offices
Preceded by Yu Weiliang	Communist Party Secretary of Longgang District; 2009–2014	Succeeded by Yang Hong
Preceded by Wang Huiming	Secretary of the Shenzhen Municipal Political and Legal Commission; 2013–2014	Succeeded by Li Huanan
