= Yin Hailin =

Chinese politician

- 尹海林

Vice-mayor of Tianjin
- In office May 2012 – August 2016

Personal details
- Born: April 1960 (age 66) Tianjin, China
- Party: Chinese Communist Party (expelled)
- Education: Tsinghua University; Nankai University; Tianjin University

Yin Hailin (Chinese: 尹海林; pinyin: Yǐn Hǎilín; born April 1960) is a former Chinese politician, and Vice-mayor of Tianjin, a municipality of China. He was dismissed from his position in August 2016 for investigation by the Central Commission for Discipline Inspection.

== Early life and education ==
Yin was born in Tianjin in April 1960, and he was graduated from Tianjin Red Army High School in 1978. He entered the Department of Architecture of Tsinghua University in the same year and graduated in 1983.

== Career ==
After graduating, he entered to China Academy of Urban Planning and Design, and worked as Planner. Then he backed to Tianjin and became the planner of Tianjin Urban and Rural Planning and Design Institute.

Yin was the deputy director of Tianjin Planning and Land Resources Bureau since 2000 and promoted to the post of director in 2007. In 2012, he was elected as Vice-mayor of Tianjin and deputy-secretary of the Chinese Communist Party's Political and Legal Affairs Commission of Tianjin.

=== Corruption allegations ===
On August 22, 2016, Yin was placed under investigation by the Central Commission for Discipline Inspection, the party's internal disciplinary body, for "serious violations of regulations". Yin Hailin was expelled from the Chinese Communist Party, and demoted to sub-division level (fuchuji) on January 20, 2017.
