= Cai Guangliao =

Chinese senior police officer

- 蔡广辽
- Born: September 1958 (age 68); Yingkou, Liaoning, China
- Military career
- Allegiance: People's Republic of China
- Branch: People's Armed Police
- Rank: Major general
- Commands: Deputy Director of the Social and Legislative Committee of the Guangdong Provincial Committee of the Chinese People's Political Consultative Conference (2013–2015)

Chinese name
- Simplified Chinese: 蔡广辽
- Traditional Chinese: 蔡廣遼
Transcriptions
Standard Mandarin
- Hanyu Pinyin: Caì Guǎngliáo

Cai Guangliao (born September 1958) is a Chinese senior police officer who spent most of his career in Guangdong province. He was investigated by the Commission for Discipline Inspection of the Central Military Commission in January 2015 and removed from office in January 2015. Previously he served as the deputy director of the Social and Legislative Committee of the Guangdong Provincial Committee of the Chinese People's Political Consultative Conference. Cai is the third senior political adviser to come under investigation in Guangdong province.

Cai is a major general in the armed police, which is overseen by the military commission.

== Life and career ==
Cai was born in Yingkou, Liaoning, in November 1973, while his ancestral home is in Jiexi County, Guangdong. During the Cultural Revolution, Cai became a sent-down youth and worked in Shixing County.

In September 1975, he was accepted to the Guangdong Politics and Law Cadre Institute (广东省政法干部学校) and graduated in September 1977. After college, he was assigned to the Guard Bureau with the Guangdong Public Security Department. And he served as deputy director of the general office of the Guangdong Provincial Committee of the Chinese Communist Party and director of the Guard Bureau with the Guangdong Public Security Department from September 2003 to July 2012. He attained the rank of major general (shao jiang) in August 2006.

In February 2013, he was appointed the deputy director of the Social and Legislative Committee of the Guangdong Provincial Committee of the Chinese People's Political Consultative Conference. He was mainly in charge of security work in Guangdong, which borders on the Hong Kong and Macau special administrative regions.

== Downfall ==
On October 30, 2014, he was taken away by anti-graft officers from the Commission for Discipline Inspection of the Central Military Commission. On January 13, 2015, he was removed from office.

On March 27, 2017, Cai was sentenced to 8 years for accepting bribes by the Guangzhou Intermediate People's Court.
