= Sun Zhaoxue =

Chinese businessman

Sun Zhaoxue (Chinese: 孙兆学) is a former Chinese state-owned enterprise executive and former CEO of China Gold, the largest gold mining company in China. He was arrested to face corruption charges in 2015.

He has been described by the Financial Times as a visionary for efforts in lobbying within Chinese policy circles to elevate gold to a strategic status similar to oil. He published an article in 2012 in Qiushi, a political theory publication circulated among Chinese policymakers, laying out a plan for a greater role for gold in the political economy of China. His plan called for a greater accumulation of gold reserves to underpin the development of the renminbi into an international currency. To bring in the gold, Sun called for investment in Chinese mining companies, participation by consumers in buying gold, and overseas acquisitions of gold mines.

Sun later became chief executive of Chinalco. On September 15, 2014, Sun Zhaoxue was placed under investigation by the Party's internal disciplinary body for "serious violations of laws and regulations". On December 23, 2014, Sun Zhaoxue was expelled from the Communist Party.

On December 27, 2016, Sun was sentenced to 16 years in prison.
