= Zhou Chunyu =

Chinese politician (born 1968)

- 周春雨

Vice Governor of Anhui
- In office September 2016 – April 2017

Personal details
- Born: July 1968 (age 58) Tianchang, Anhui
- Party: Chinese Communist Party (expelled)
- Education: Anhui University

Zhou Chunyu (Chinese: 周春雨; pinyin: Zhōu Chūnyǔ; born July 1968) is a former Chinese politician, and Vice Governor of Anhui. He was dismissed from his position in April 2017 for investigation by the Central Commission for Discipline Inspection.

== Career ==
Zhou was born in Tianchang, Anhui in July 1968, and entered Anhui University in 1985. From 1989 to 1995, he served in the Office of the Hefei Committee of the Chinese Communist Party (CCP). In 1995, he served in the Office of the CCP Anhui Committee, and the Office of the People's Government of Anhui. He moved to the Financial Department of Anhui in 2000.

In 2007, he became a vice mayor of Ma'anshan, and was promoted to mayor in 2008. In 2010, he moved to Bengbu, became the mayor and CCP Committee Secretary in 2012. In September 2016, Zhou was promoted to Vice Governor of Anhui.

== Investigation ==
On April 26, 2017, Zhou was placed under investigation by the Central Commission for Discipline Inspection, the party's internal disciplinary body, for "serious violations of regulations". He is the youngest Provincial-Ministerial level official since the beginning of Xi Jinping's anti-corruption drive after he took power in late 2012, and the fourth implicated Vice Governor of Anhui. Anhui became the province with the most implicated Vice Governors.

Zhou was expelled from the CCP on July 5, 2017. Zhou was charged with abusing various positions he held in Anhui between 1996 and 2017 to help others in project contracting and business acquisition, accepting money and goods worth 13.65 million yuan (1.97 million U.S. dollars) in return. Besides, he also charged with abusing of power, concealing 4.12 million U.S. dollars foreign deposits and illegally making 359 million yuan (50.2 million U.S. dollars) of gains from insider trading, stood trial at the Intermediate People's Court of Jinan in Shandong Province on 25 October 2018. On February 22, 2019, Zhou was sentenced on 20 years in prison and fined 361 million yuan.
