= Sui Fengfu =

Chinese politician

- 隋凤富

Vice Chairman of the Standing Committee of the Heilongjiang Provincial People's Congress
- In office January 2013 – November 2014
- Chairman: Ji Bingxuan; Wang Xiankui

Party Committee Secretary of Heilongjiang Provincial State-owned Farms Administrative Bureau
- In office February 2008 – November 2014
- Preceded by: Lü Weifeng
- Succeeded by: Wang Zhaoli

Director of Heilongjiang Provincial State-owned Farms Administrative Bureau
- In office February 2005 – April 2013
- Preceded by: Lü Weifeng
- Succeeded by: Wang Youguo

Personal details
- Born: December 3, 1956 (age 69) Penglai, Shandong, China
- Party: Chinese Communist Party (1987–2015; expelled)
- Education: Harbin Institute of Technology; Central Party School of the Chinese Communist Party

Sui Fengfu (simplified Chinese: 隋凤富; traditional Chinese: 隋鳳富; pinyin: Suí Fèngfù; born 3 December 1956) is a former Chinese agricultural official who spent most of his career in Heilongjiang province. He was the Party Secretary of Heilongjiang Provincial State-owned Farms Administrative Bureau, China's largest state-owned agriculture cooperative that employs some 900,000 people. Sui also served as the Vice Chairman of the Standing Committee of the Heilongjiang People's Congress, i.e., the provincial legislature.

In November 2014, Sui was placed under investigation by the Communist Party's anti-corruption agency. Sui was the second high-ranking politician being examined from Heilongjiang province after the 18th Party Congress in 2012.

== Life and career ==
Sui was born and raised in Penglai, Shandong. He earned an MBA from Harbin Institute of Technology in 2011, he was also studied at Central Party School of the Chinese Communist Party as a part-time student. He became involved in politics in September 1977 and joined the Chinese Communist Party in May 1987.

Beginning in September 1977, he served in several posts in Heilongjiang Provincial State-owned Farms Administrative Bureau, including director, deputy CPC Party Chief, and CPC Party Chief.

In January 2013, he was promoted to become the Deputy head of the standing committee of the Heilongjiang provincial people's congress, he is also served as the CPC Party Chief and director of Heilongjiang Provincial State-owned Farms Administrative Bureau. The Bureau owns a large number of farms throughout the province and employs some 900,000 people, making Sui's position as its Party Secretary extremely powerful.

Sui was a delegate to the 11th National People's Congress. Sui also once served as a guest professor at Heilongjiang Bayi Agricultural University and Northeast Agricultural University, and vice-president of Young Entrepreneurs Association in Heilongjiang.

== Downfall ==
On November 27, 2014, Sui was placed under investigation by the Central Commission for Discipline Inspection for "serious violations of laws and regulations".

On February 13, 2015, the Central Commission for Discipline Inspection issued a press release, announcing that Sui was expelled from the Communist Party. The CCDI said that Sui used the convenience of his office to seek illicit gains for others and took "huge bribes", and that he did not "change his ways" after the 18th Party Congress. His case was then moved to criminal prosecution.

On December 19, 2016, Sui was sentenced to 11 years in prison for taking bribes. He was found guilty of taking advantage of his positions between 2003 and 2014, including selection and promotion of several individuals.

Government offices
Preceded by Lü Weifeng	Director of Heilongjiang Provincial State-owned Farms Administrative Bureau; 2005–2013	Succeeded by Wang Youguo
Party political offices
Preceded by Lü Weifeng	Party Committee Secretary of Heilongjiang Provincial State-owned Farms Administrative Bureau; 2008–2014	Succeeded by Wang Zhaoli
