= Chen Qiang (general) =

Former military officer in the Chinese People's Liberation Army

- 陈强
- Born: February 1956 (age 70); Yicheng, Hubei, China
- Military career
- Allegiance: People's Republic of China
- Branch: People's Liberation Army
- Rank: Major general
- Commands: Deputy Commander of 96351 Unit of the Second Artillery Corps

Chen Qiang
- Traditional Chinese: 陳強
- Simplified Chinese: 陈强
Transcriptions
Standard Mandarin
- Hanyu Pinyin: Chén Qiáng

Chen Qiang (born February 1956) is a former military officer in the Chinese People's Liberation Army. He attained the rank of major general in July 2010. He graduated from PLA National Defense University. He once served as Deputy Commander of 96351 Unit of the Second Artillery Corps. During the 2008 Sichuan earthquake, he joined in the relief work. In May 2014, he was sentenced to life imprisonment for "corruption, bribery, huge amount of property with unidentified sources".
