= Liaoning Petrochemical University =

University in Fushun, China

- 辽宁石油化工大学
- Established: 1950
- President: Prof. Li Ping
- Academic staff: 1,000
- Undergraduates: 15,000
- Postgraduates: 1,200
- Location: Fushun, Liaoning, China
- Website: www.lnpu.edu.cn

Liaoning Petrochemical University (Chinese: 辽宁石油化工大学; pinyin: Liáoníng Shíyóu Huàgōng Dàxué) is a university in Fushun, Liaoning, People's Republic of China, under the provincial government.

It was founded in 1950 at Dalian as the first petroleum and chemical technology university of the People's Republic of China. In 1953, it moved to Fushun.

More than 60,000 students graduated, most of whom have become managers and core technicians in Chinese petroleum and related companies. There are 13 academicians of the Chinese Academy of Science and Chinese Academy of Engineering. Its engineering is relatively strong in China, especially in petroleum-related areas.
