= PLA Information Engineering University =

Chinese military university

Information Engineering University
- 中国人民解放军信息工程大学
- Logo of the Information Engineering Institute
- Other names: Zhengzhou Information Science and Technology Institute
- Former names: PLA Information Engineering Institute
- Established: 1999; 27 years ago
- Parent institution: People's Liberation Army
- Location: 34°48′55″N 113°34′04″E
- Website: zhaosheng.plaieu.edu.cn

The Information Engineering University (IEU) is a military university in Zhengzhou, Henan, under the People's Liberation Army. It was established in 1999. Before that, it was named as the PLA Information Engineering Institute.

The name Zhengzhou Information Science and Technology Institute is used as a cover by researchers from the university, when they wish to hide their affiliation with the Chinese military. The name Zhengzhou Institute of Surveying and Mapping has been used for a similar purpose – that institute, officially known as the PLA Institute of Surveying and Mapping, was integrated into the PLA Information Engineering University in 1999.

It is reputed to be a center for information warfare research.

== See also ==
- Academic institutions of the armed forces of China
- Chinese information operations and information warfare
