= Eight-point Regulation =

2012 Chinese Communist Party rules

The Eight-point Regulation from the Central (Chinese: 中央八项规定) is a set of regulations stipulated by the Politburo of the Chinese Communist Party (CCP) in 2012 aimed at instilling more discipline among party members and making the party "closer to the masses". They were first announced on 4 December 2012, after a Politburo meeting led by Xi Jinping, who then had recently become General Secretary of the CCP. Detailed implementing regulations were adopted by the Politburo in 2022.

In effect, the regulations "aim to reduce bureaucracy, extravagance and undesirable work practices of CCP members," calls for party members and officials in particular to "do real work, say real things", and understand the practical situation on the ground. It seeks to tackle "practices of extravagance, formalism and bureaucracy" that permeated Chinese officialdom during the rule of Xi Jinping's predecessors. Beginning in 2012, local authorities implemented the regulation and stressed reforms as such prohibiting private use of public cars, reduce and simplify official meetings, and prohibit expensive meals and showy official trips.

== History ==
The eight-point regulation has played a significant role in Xi Jinping's anticorruption campaign. Within three years, 138,867 party officials were punished for violations of the regulations. The regulations led a drop in official banqueting and entertainment, as well as a reduction in number of meetings, plan fulfillment celebrations, and land requisitions for official use, expensive government cars, overseas trips, clubs, and "cadre training". It also led to a reduction in vanity projects.

On 27 October 2017, the first meeting of the Politburo of the 19th Central Committee of the Chinese Communist Party (Chinese: 中国共产党第十九届中央委员会第一次全体会议) considered the Implementing Rules of the Political Bureau of the CCP Central Committee for Implementing the Eight-point Regulation of the Central Committee (Chinese: 中共中央政治局贯彻落实中央八项规定的实施细则).

At the end of 2021, the Politburo held a meeting and considered the Report on the Implementation of the Eight-point Regulation of the Central Committee by the Political Bureau of the Central Committee in 2021 (Chinese: 关于2021年中央政治局贯彻执行中央八项规定情况的报告) and the Report on the Work of Rectifying Formalism and Reducing Burdens for the Grassroots in 2021.

In September 2022, the meeting of the Political Bureau of the Central Committee considered the Report on the Implementation of the Eight-point Regulation of the Central Committee by the Political Bureau of the 19th Central Committee (Chinese: 十九届中央政治局贯彻执行中央八项规定情况报告).

On 25 October 2022, the General Secretary Xi Jinping presided over a meeting of the Politburo, and one of the important agendas of the meeting was to consider the implementation rules for the Eight-point Regulation (Chinese: 中共中央政治局贯彻落实中央八项规定实施细则), and the meeting put forward the idea that the Eight-point Regulation of the Central Committee must always be regarded as the "long-term and effective rules of iron, and a hard bar".

== Regulation Text ==
1. Leaders must keep in close contact with the grassroots. They must understand the real situation facing society through in-depth inspections at grassroots. Greater attention should be focused on places where social problems are more acute, and inspection tours must be carried out more thoroughly. Inspection tours as a mere formality should be strictly prohibited. Leaders should work and listen to the public and officials at the grassroots, and people's practical problems must be tackled. There should be no welcome banner, no red carpet, no floral arrangement or grand receptions for officials' visits. (Note: 要改进调查研究，到基层调研要深入了解真实情况，总结经验、研究问题、解决困难、指导工作，向群众学习、向实践学习，多同群众座谈，多同干部谈心，多商量讨论，多解剖典型，多到困难和矛盾集中、群众意见多的地方去，切忌走过场、搞形式主义；要轻车简从、减少陪同、简化接待，不张贴悬挂标语横幅，不安排群众迎送，不铺设迎宾地毯，不摆放花草，不安排宴请。)

2. Meetings and major events should be strictly regulated, and efficiency improved. Political Bureau members are not allowed to attend ribbon-cutting or cornerstone-laying ceremonies, or celebrations and seminars, unless they get approval from the Party Central Committee. Official meetings should get shortened and be specific and to the point, with no empty and rigmarole talks. (Note: 要精简会议活动，切实改进会风，严格控制以中央名义召开的各类全国性会议和举行的重大活动，不开泛泛部署工作和提要求的会，未经中央批准一律不出席各类剪彩、奠基活动和庆祝会、纪念会、表彰会、博览会、研讨会及各类论坛；提高会议实效，开短会、讲短话，力戒空话、套话。)

3. The issuing of official documents should be reduced. (Note: 要精简文件简报，切实改进文风，没有实质内容、可发可不发的文件、简报一律不发。)

4. Officials' visits abroad should only be arranged when needed in terms of foreign affairs with fewer accompanying members, and on most of the occasions, there is no need for a reception by overseas Chinese people, institutions and students at the airport. (Note: 要规范出访活动，从外交工作大局需要出发合理安排出访活动，严格控制出访随行人员，严格按照规定乘坐交通工具，一般不安排中资机构、华侨华人、留学生代表等到机场迎送。)

5. There should be fewer traffic controls when leaders travel by cars to avoid unnecessary inconvenience to the public. There should be fewer traffic controls arranged for the leaders' security of their trips to avoid unnecessary inconvenience to the public. (Note: 要改进警卫工作，坚持有利于联系群众的原则，减少交通管制，一般情况下不得封路、不清场闭馆。)

6. The media must not report on stories about official events unless there is real news value. The regulations also ban worthless news reports on senior officials' work and activities and said such reports should depend on work needs, news value and social effects. (Note: 要改进新闻报道，中央政治局同志出席会议和活动应根据工作需要、新闻价值、社会效果决定是否报道，进一步压缩报道的数量、字数、时长。)

7. Leaders should not publish any works by themselves or issue any congratulatory letters unless an arrangement with the central leadership has been made. Official documents without substantial contents and realistic importance should be withheld. Publications regarding senior officials' work and activities are also restricted. (Note: 要严格文稿发表，除中央统一安排外，个人不公开出版著作、讲话单行本，不发贺信、贺电，不题词、题字。)

8. Leaders must practise thrift and strictly follow relevant regulations on accommodation and cars. (Note: 要厉行勤俭节约，严格遵守廉洁从政有关规定，严格执行住房、车辆配备等有关工作和生活待遇的规定。)

== See also ==
- Sumptuary law
