= Zhou Yongkang case =

2015 Chinese corruption case

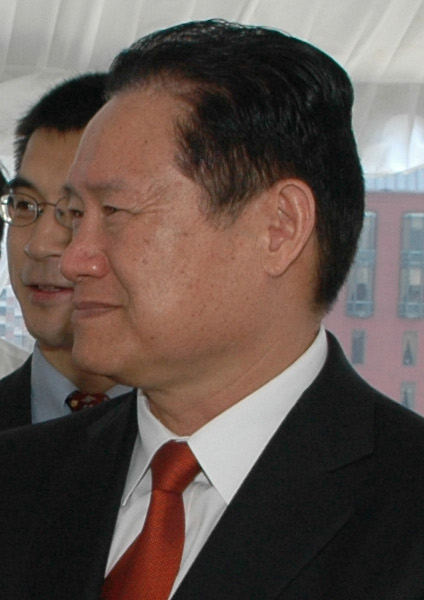
- Court: Tianjin First Intermediate People's Court
- Decided: 11 June 2015
- Verdict: Life imprisonment

The Zhou Yongkang case refers to a case involving Zhou Yongkang, former member of the Politburo Standing Committee of the Chinese Communist Party and Secretary of the Central Political and Legal Affairs Commission, who retired in 2012. The Chinese Communist Party (CCP) case is officially called the Zhou Yongkang serious violations of discipline case while the criminal case is officially called the Zhou Yongkang bribery, abuse of power, and intentional disclosure of state secrets case.

Zhou was investigated internally by the CCP starting in 2013, and expelled from the CCP after the Central Commission for Discipline Inspection announced the filing of a case for investigation in 2014. The case involved Zhou Yongkang's serious violation of discipline, and subsequently, after being investigated and arrested by the Supreme People's Procuratorate, he was transferred to the First Branch of the Tianjin Municipal People's Procuratorate in 2015 and prosecuted by the Tianjin First Intermediate People's Court, being sentenced to life imprisonment. The case involved Zhou's bribery, abuse of power, and intentional disclosure of state secrets. The "Zhou Yongkang case" in a broader sense also includes a series of criminal cases involving his relatives, related businessmen, and many officials from his faction, including Zhou Yongkang's son Zhou Bin, Sichuan businessman Liu Han, and Zhou Yongkang's secretary Ji Wenlin.

The scope of the Zhou Yongkang case and its series of cases covered many fields such as politics, economy, and culture, spanned decades, and covered the regions of Northeast China, Southwestern China, East China, and Beijing, and the central government. The officials involved almost encompassed the entire cadre system of the CCP, from county-level, department-level, provincial-level to national-level. Zhou was the first member of the Politburo Standing Committee to be investigated for corruption and expelled from the CCP since the founding of the People's Republic of China in 1949. He was also the highest-ranking official to be investigated. Zhou Yongkang's downfall was seen by outsiders as breaking the unspoken political rule of "no punishment for Standing Committee members" that had been rumored in the public since the Deng Xiaoping era. Zhou was imprisoned in Qincheng Prison, where he was said to have a vegetable garden to grow vegetables to pass the time.

== Background ==
Zhou Yongkang is a former senior leader of the Chinese Communist Party (CCP). He led the China National Petroleum Corporation (CNPC) from 1996 to 1998 before serving as Minister of Land and Natural Resources until 1999. Subsequently, Zhou became the Party Secretary of Sichuan. From 2003 to 2008, Zhou served as State Councillor, the Minister of Public Security, the Political Commissar of the People's Armed Police, a Member on the Secretariat of the Central Committee, and the Deputy Secretary of the Central Political and Legal Affairs Commission. In October 2007, the 17th Central Committee elected Zhou to the Politburo Standing Committee (PSC), where he served as the Secretary of the Central Political and Legal Affairs Commission. He retired at the 18th Party Congress in 2012.

Zhou retired at the 18th Party Congress held in November 2012, an event which saw Xi Jinping, the General Secretary of the Chinese Communist Party, ascend to become China's paramount leader. In a significant change to China's top ruling council, Zhou's Political and Legal Affairs Commission portfolio did not feature in the new Standing Committee at all; instead, the committee had shrunk to its pre-2002 size of seven instead of nine members. This was followed by wide-ranging reforms to local Zhengfawei organs. For example, the practice of lower-level Zhengfawei chiefs concurrently holding the office of police chief (i.e. Public Security) and concurrent government posts was gradually phased out, and the Zhengfawei was discouraged from directly interfering with ongoing investigations or cases. These reforms signaled a reduction in the executive authority of Zhengfawei chiefs in favor of better checks and balances in the legal system, and a restoration of the Zhengfawei in a policy oversight role rather than being an executive organ, which had been the case under Zhou.

== Trials ==
| Name | Ranking | Position/Former Position | Relationship with Zhou Yongkang | Date | Status | Ref. |
|---|---|---|---|---|---|---|
| Zhou Yongkang | National-level | Former member of the Politburo Standing Committee and former Secretary of the Central Political and Legal Affairs Commission | N/A | 29 July 2014 | Expelled from the Party, dismissed from public office, and sentenced to life imprisonment | |
| Jiang Jiemin | Ministerial level | Director of the State-owned Assets Supervision and Administration Commission of the State Council | Subsidiary of China National Petroleum Corporation | 1 September 2013 | Expelled from the Party, dismissed from public office, and sentenced to 16 years in prison | |
| Li Dongsheng | Ministerial level | Deputy Secretary of the Party Committee and Vice Minister of the Ministry of Public Security | Subordinate during the Political and Legal Affairs Commission period | 20 December 2013 | Expelled from the Party, dismissed from public office, and sentenced to 15 years in prison | |
| Li Chongxi | Ministerial level | Chairman of the Sichuan Provincial Committee of the Chinese People's Political Consultative Conference | Subordinate during the Sichuan period | 29 December 2013 | Expelled from the Party, dismissed from public office, and sentenced to 12 years in prison. | |
| Zhou Benshun | Ministerial level | Secretary of the Hebei Provincial Committee of the Chinese Communist Party and Chairman of the Standing Committee of the Hebei Provincial People's Congress | Subordinate during the Political and Legal Affairs Commission period | 24 July 2015 | Expelled from the Party, dismissed from public office, and sentenced to 15 years in prison | |
| Li Chuncheng | Vice-ministerial level | Deputy Secretary of the Sichuan Provincial Committee of the Chinese Communist Party | Subordinate during the Sichuan period | 6 December 2013 | Expelled from the party, dismissed from public office, and sentenced to 13 years in prison | |
| Guo Yongxiang | Vice-ministerial level | Chairman of the Sichuan Provincial Federation of Literary and Art Circles and former Vice Governor | Zhou Yongkang's secretary | 22 June 2013 | Expelled from the Party, dismissed from public office, and sentenced to 20 years in prison | |
| Wang Yongchun | Vice-ministerial level | Vice President of China National Petroleum Corporation | Jiang Jiemin's subordinate | 26 August 2013 | Expelled from the Party, dismissed from public office, and sentenced to 20 years in prison | |
| Ji Wenlin | Vice-ministerial level | Vice Governor of Hainan | Secretary during the Ministry of Land and Resources | 18 February 2014 | Expelled from the Party, dismissed from public office, and sentenced to 12 years in prison | |
| Tao Yuchun | Department-level | General Manager of Kunlun Utilization, a subsidiary of PetroChina | Li Hualin's subordinate | 20 March 2013 | Sentenced to 23 years in prison and fined ¥7.5 million renminbi. | |
| Jia Xiaoye | | China Central Television work | Zhou Yongkang's wife | | Sentenced to nine years in prison and fined ¥1 million renminbi. | |
| Zhou Bin | | Shareholders of Zhongxu Sunshine Energy Technology Co., Ltd. | Zhou Yongkang's son | 1 December 2013 | Sentenced to 18 years in prison and fined ¥350.2 million renminbi. | |
| Zhou Feng | | Chairman of Beijing Honghan and shareholder of Hongfeng Potash Mine | Zhou Yongkang's nephew | 1 December 2013 | Sentenced to 12 years in prison and fined ¥59 million renminbi. | |

== Related cases ==
=== Zhou Bin case ===
Zhou Yongkang's eldest son, Zhou Bin, studied Science and Technology English at Southwest Petroleum University from 1989 to 1992, and was an alumnus of Mi Xiaodong and Zhu Liping. Later, he went to the University of Texas at Dallas to study, where he met Huang Yusheng and Zhan Minli's daughter, Huang Wan, and married her. The two returned to China in 2001. During his studies in the United States, Zhou Bin sold foreign oil equipment to Chinese oil companies through his connections. His main business was reselling oil equipment, reselling oilfield equity, obtaining projects as a supplier of China National Petroleum Corporation (CNPC), and holding shares in unverified companies.

In 2001, under the control of Zhou Bin, Sichuan businessman Wu Bing established Zhongxu Investment. Zhongxu Industry, registered in March 2006, has two hydropower development companies, one real estate development company and several hydropower and real estate business extension companies. It mainly developed two hydropower projects: the Dadu River Longtoushi Hydropower Station with a total installed capacity of 700,000 kilowatts and an investment of ¥5.3 billion renminbi, and the Geshizha Hydropower Station with a total installed capacity of 450,000 kilowatts and an investment of ¥3.2 billion renminbi. Zhan Minli held a partial controlling stake in the Dadu River Longtoushi Hydropower Station.

In 2004, Zhou Bin, who had returned to China, established Beijing Zhongxu Sunshine Petroleum and Natural Gas Technology Co., Ltd., which was managed by Wu Bing. The major shareholders of Zhongxu Sunshine were initially Zhou Bin and Zhan Minli, and later Zhan Minli sold his shares to Zhou Bin. Shortly after its establishment, Zhongxu Sunshine Energy won the information development project of the retail management system of more than 8,000 gas stations of more than 10 provincial branches of PetroChina. It also participated in the construction of PetroChina's refined oil logistics distribution system and engineering project management system and information system, and had equipment sales relationships with PetroChina's Tarim oil field, Jilin oil field, Changqing oil field and Liaohe oil field branches.

In January 2007, Mi Xiaodong invested in the establishment of Shaanxi Qiuhai Jiqing Petroleum Technology Co., Ltd. in Xi'an. At the end of the same year, Shaanxi Degan Petroleum Technology Co., Ltd. was established at the same office address in Xi'an (the actual controller of the two companies was Zhou Bin). The two companies acquired the Changyin and Changhai blocks of the Changqing Oilfield Petroleum Cooperative Development Project at a low price of about ¥10 million to ¥20 million renminbi. Mi Xiaodong sold Degan and its Changyin project to Wang Letian, chairman of Jilin private company Huahai Energy Group, for ¥550 million renminbi. Later, Wang Letian discovered that the exploitable area of the Changyin project was only 13 square kilometers, less than 50 square kilometers, and demanded to renegotiate with Mi Xiaodong and Zhou Bin. As a result, Qiuhai Jiqing's Changhai project and a small oil field in Wangpanshan were compensated to Wang Letian.

In 2009, Zhan Minli and Mi Xiaodong jointly established Beijing Qiuhai Xurong Real Estate Development Company and obtained the qualification to construct the public rental housing project in the NC-01 block of Nankou Farm, Beijing. In August 2010, Zhan Minli transferred most of the 15.5 million shares of Beijing Yunying Xurong Investment Management Co., Ltd., which controlled Qiuhai Xurong, to Beijing Tianheng Lianxin Real Estate Co., Ltd. Between 2010 and 2011, Zhou Bin acted as an intermediary to assist Mi Xiaodong in selling several batches of oil and gas extraction equipment to Chinese operating companies that cooperated with the Iraqi state-owned company Missan Oilfield.

In 2011, five companies including Huisheng Sunshine, with Zhan Minli as the major shareholder, leased about 200 square meters of office space at No. 3 Naibai Road, Laiguangying Township, Chaoyang District, Beijing, and 300 mu of land originally used for a golf course. The lease term was 20 years, with an annual rent of ¥6,000 renminbi per mu. The purpose was unknown. Huisheng Sunshine also invested in Beijing Huirun Sunshine Energy Technology Co., Ltd. (also located at No. 3 Naibai Road), owned by Guo Lianxing, son of Guo Yongxiang, secretary of Zhou Yongkang. Zhan Minli, Mi Xiaodong, and Beijing Haosheng Yijia Investment Management Co., Ltd., also registered at No. 3 Naibai Road, invested in three companies in Hebei, Sichuan, and Hainan: Baoding Zhongmao Energy Co., Ltd., Haosheng Yijia and Huaqi Clean Energy Investment Co., Ltd. of Kunlun Energy Co., Ltd. under PetroChina, and Baoding Guangyang Natural Gas Utilization Co., Ltd. In addition to Zhongxu Group, Hua Bangsong, chairman of Wison Engineering & Technology Services Co., Ltd., an oil equipment supplier, was rumored to be holding company shares on behalf of Zhou Bin. He was investigated by relevant departments in August 2013.

With his profits, Zhou Bin owned a villa in Guantang Villas, Beijing, worth ¥20 million renminbi. In Fangheng International Building, Wangjing New Town, there were at least 8 properties under the name of Zhou Bin's mother-in-law, Zhan Minli, with a building area of about 1,000 square meters. There was an apartment under the name of Zhan Minli in Huating Jiayuan next to the Olympic Center on the North Fourth Ring Road. In 2012, he sold a house in Yinhu Villas, Beijing, for ¥35 million to ¥40 million renminbi.

=== The case of Jia Xiaoye and Jia Xiaoxia ===
Zhou Yongkang's second wife, Jia Xiaoye, worked for China Central Television (CCTV)'s financial channel. Her younger sister, Jia Xiaoxia, studied at the School of Foreign Languages at Fudan University. With Zhou Yongkang's support, she entered the petroleum system and worked for PetroChina's Ecuadorian and Canadian branches. Later, she became the general manager of PetroChina International Canada.

Under Jia Xiaoxia's operation, CNPC hastily invested $4 billion Canadian dollars to acquire two oil sands projects in Canada before the reserves were explored. CNPC must invest at least $30 billion Canadian dollars in the next ten years in order to see oil. This acquisition brought a large amount of state-owned assets into the pocket of Zhou Yongkang's family. It was revealed that Zhou Yongkang had a secret account in Canada and large amounts of assets in Canada. Jia Xiaoxia was Zhou Yongkang's agent in Canada. Over the years, Jia Xiaoxia has amassed at least several billion US dollars and actually controlled CNPC's assets worth tens of billions of US dollars. At the APEC China 2014 in Beijing, Chinese leader Xi Jinping spoke with Canadian prime minister Stephen Harper, who said "Canada has no intention of harboring fugitives and is willing to cooperate with China on repatriation."

=== Zhou Yuanxing and Zhou Yuanqing case ===
After Zhou Yongkang rose to prominence, Zhou Yuanxing, Zhou Yongkang's younger brother, and his son Zhou Xiaohua made their fortune as agents for Wuliangye liquor. They also used their relationship with Zhou Yongkang to plead for people in lawsuits and get people released, sent students to a police academy in Jiangsu, and did business in steel pipes for oil fields without having a factory.

Another younger brother, Zhou Yuanqing, once served as the deputy mayor of Houqiao Town, Wuxi City, the director of the Xishan Economic and Technological Cooperation Office, and the deputy director of the Huishan District Land and Resources Bureau. His wife, Zhou Lingying, is a shareholder of Xishan Changlong Trade Co., Ltd., which is involved in the gas station business. She also founded Wuxi Junfeng Agricultural Materials Development Co., Ltd., which sells fertilizers, pesticides, metal materials, fire-fighting facilities and equipment. Their son, Zhou Feng, invested in and founded several companies in Beijing, Dongguan and other places, and had complicated relationships with companies related to PetroChina. When the relevant departments investigated Zhou Yuanqing's home, they found a large amount of gold, jewelry, cigarettes and alcohol, as well as a large bunch of Audi car keys.

=== Jiang Jiemin case ===
Jiang Jiemin, the general manager of CNPC who was promoted by Zhou Yongkang, replaced a project that was about to be explored in Changqing oil field with a project that had already produced oil, and then approved it to people related to him for external cooperation in development.

=== Relationship with the Liu Han case ===
In 2000, Zhou Yongkang was transferred to the position of Secretary of the Sichuan Provincial Committee of the Chinese Communist Party, bringing his secretaries Guo Yongxiang and Ji Wenlin with him and keeping them in office, thereby expanding his influence in Sichuan. Although he did not agree with Zhou Bin's expansion of influence in Sichuan, Zhou Bin still opened companies there.

In 2002, five people, including Zhou Bin's wife Huang Wan, established Sichuan Chaoyue Co., Ltd. in Chengdu. More than half a month before its official establishment, the company signed a development agreement for the Jiudingshan Scenic Area with the Maoxian County People's Government, with a validity period of 50 years. In October 2004, Chaoyue Company transferred the resort development rights and intangible assets of the scenic area to Liu Han's Hanlong Group for ¥20 million renminbi. According to the assessment, the scenic spot was worth only about ¥5-6 million renminbi.

Later, Liu Han and Zhou Bin established Xingding Power Company in Aba Prefecture, Sichuan, to develop the power resources of the Maoergai River. Zhou Bin held 20% of the shares. The project was approved by the county, prefecture and provincial development and reform commissions and applied for a bank loan of ¥600 million renminbi. In 2009, Hanlong Group bought back 20% of the equity of Xingding Power Company from Zhou Bin, but in fact did not pay.

=== The CCTV anchor involved in the case ===
In January 2014, Ye Yingchun, a famous anchorwoman of China Central Television (CCTV), and Shen Bing, a former anchorwoman, were also investigated for their involvement in the Zhou Yongkang case. In January 2014, Ye and Shen were taken away by the Central Commission for Discipline Inspection (CCDI) for investigation in connection with the Zhou Yongkang case. The two CCTV anchorwomen were "considered to be Zhou Yongkang's mistresses." The veracity of this report has not yet been confirmed.

== Investigation ==
=== Consensus among party leaders ===
The new party leadership under Xi Jinping reportedly began planning the crackdown on Zhou beginning in 2012. Xi's 'tough talk' on corruption began immediately after his ascension to the post of General Secretary. In his first days in office, Xi vowed to crack down on "tigers and flies", meaning extremely powerful officials as well as petty ones, launching a far-reaching anti-corruption campaign. Xi moved quickly to set a new standard for the expected behavior of party officials, issuing a series of guidelines to clean up the party bureaucracy. Xi may have also been concerned that Zhou might use his influence and power to turn various state security entities into tools for advancing his interests, and in the process, undermine the central authority of the state.

Discussions surrounding the Zhou case took place in the summer of 2013. In June, the Politburo of the Chinese Communist Party held a four-day-long conference in Beijing specifically to discuss Zhou Yongkang. During the meeting, the members of the Politburo reportedly exchanged differing viewpoints on Zhou. Eventually, Xi Jinping and the other six members of the newly formed 18th Politburo Standing Committee came to a consensus to investigate Zhou. Zhou's case was unprecedented, as no corruption investigation had ever been initiated against a member of the elite Politburo Standing Committee. The last PSC member to be ousted politically was Zhao Ziyang in the aftermath of the 1989 Tiananmen Square protests and massacre, and the last PSC members to be put on trial were those of the Gang of Four following the Cultural Revolution.

Owing to the far-reaching impact Zhou's case would have on the party as well as the potential for intra-party conflict, Xi also reportedly sought the blessing of former CCP General Secretary Jiang Zemin and Hu Jintao, as well as other 'party elders'. Jiang was said to have met with Xi several times in Beijing between June and July to discuss Zhou Yongkang. During these meetings, Xi was said to have directly elaborated to Jiang on Zhou's alleged crimes, as well as convincing Jiang of the potential harm to the party and the state if Zhou was not brought down. Jiang, though initially reluctant, eventually threw his weight behind Xi. Jiang subsequently applauded Xi's leadership skills during a visit by former U.S. Secretary of State Henry Kissinger. Hu Jintao was reportedly fully supportive of investigating Zhou before the power transition to Xi Jinping at the 18th Party Congress. Zhou himself reportedly sought two audiences with Xi, during which he discussed his contributions to the country and attempted to plead clemency, to no avail.

=== Investigation by relevant personnel ===
In 2013, Zhou appeared in public three times. He visited his alma maters, Suzhou High School and the China University of Petroleum in April and October, respectively; on 23 June, Zhou visited the Zibo, Shandong–based Qilu Petrochemicals Company (Chinese: 齐鲁石化公司), a subsidiary of Sinopec. His visit to Suzhou High School also marked his final pilgrimage to his hometown. During this visit, Zhou suggested that it might be his last visit home. At his visit to the Changping Campus of the China University of Petroleum, on 1 October 2013, Zhou publicly 'pledged his allegiance' to Xi Jinping, rallying students to unite behind Xi to pursue the Chinese Dream. After visiting the China University of Petroleum, Zhou Yongkang did not make any subsequent public appearances. His name last appeared in public reports in mainland China in late November 2013.

Starting in August 2013, the Chinese Communist Party launched an internal investigation into the corruption of Zhou Yongkang's family. Xi Jinping, General Secretary of the CCP Central Committee, set up a special task force led by Fu Zhenghua, Vice Minister of Public Security and Director of the Beijing Municipal Public Security Bureau, to investigate Zhou Yongkang. On 1 December, Zhou Yongkang's relatives, including Zhou Bin, Huang Wan, and Huang Yusheng, were taken into custody by relevant departments. Only Zhou Bin's mother-in-law, Zhan Minli, was in the United States and was not arrested. Zhou Bin had already hired two lawyers on 25 November to handle the case. At the same time, Zhou Bin's cousin Zhou Feng, his parents Zhou Yuanqing, and Zhou Yongkang's sister-in-law Zhou Lingying were also taken away for investigation. Zhou Yuanqing was "cared for" in the hospital. On the evening of 6 December 2013, Zhou Yongkang's younger brother Zhou Yuanxing's home was searched for "unexplained huge amounts of property belonging to non-state personnel". On 18 December, the Zhou family's home was searched again. On 10 February 2014, after the two searches, Zhou Yuanxing died at home. More than 160 relatives and friends attended the funeral. Zhou Yongkang and several of his relatives were unable to attend the funeral because they were under control.

In early December 2013, news broke that Zhou Yongkang and his brothers and sisters had been formally placed under house arrest and detained by the Central Commission for Discipline Inspection. In December 2013, media outside mainland China reported that Zhou Yongkang had been placed under investigation by the CCDI for allegedly launching a coup to overthrow Xi Jinping and Li Keqiang's decision to succeed him at the 18th CCP National Congress, and for ordering his assistant to kill his first wife in order to marry Jia Xiaoye. On 11 December, Zhou Yongkang was absent from the farewell ceremony for Tang Ke, the former Minister of Petroleum Industry, held at the Babaoshan Revolutionary Cemetery (Tang Ke's obituary was not publicly released until 17 December).

=== Personnel investigation ===
Sources indicated that in early December 2013, CCP General Secretary Xi Jinping and other party and state leaders reached an agreement on the formal investigation of Zhou Yongkang by the Party Committee. A high-ranking official (believed to be Li Zhanshu, then Director of the General Office of the CCP Central Committee) went to Zhou Yongkang's residence in central Beijing to inform him of the decision to investigate. After that, Zhou Yongkang and his wife Jia Xiaoye were kept under guard. This move broke the unspoken rule of "no punishment for members of the Politburo Standing Committee" and was said to have "shocked the political landscape of China." This was also the highest-ranking official to be investigated for corruption since the founding of the People's Republic of China in 1949.

On 20 December, the website of the CCDI announced that Li Dongsheng, Vice Minister of Public Security and Deputy Secretary of the Party Committee of the Ministry of Public Security, was under investigation for serious violations of discipline. Commentators believe that the downfall of Li Dongsheng, who had close ties with Zhou Yongkang, indicates that the CCP's discipline inspection department has begun to clean up Zhou Yongkang's associates, and that news of Zhou Yongkang's downfall is just around the corner. On 30 December, the CCDI announced that Li Chongxi, chairman of the Sichuan Provincial Committee of the Chinese People's Political Consultative Conference, was placed under investigation for serious violations of discipline. He was Zhou Yongkang's personal secretary when he was the secretary of the Sichuan Provincial Committee of the Chinese Communist Party. On the same day, media personality Gao Yu posted on Twitter that Zhou Yongkang had been placed under investigation on 24 December. However, the Chinese government did not make any statement. The overseas Chinese website Duowei News said that Zhou Yongkang and his allies in the oil and political and legal system, such as Jiang Jiemin and Li Dongsheng, had been arrested. This may indicate that Zhou Yongkang's arrest is not far off. If these facts are true, then this is also considered to be the biggest corruption case since the founding of the People's Republic of China. In December, Zhou, his son Zhou Bin and his daughter-in-law Huang Wan were taken into custody. The home of Zhou's younger brother Zhou Yuanxing (周元兴) was searched by the authorities twice. Yuanxing died in December 2013 after a battle with cancer. Zhou Yongkang and his son Zhou Bin were not present at the funeral, fueling speculation that Zhou and his family members were all in custody. Zhou was reportedly being held in confinement without visitation rights in a heavily guarded facility on a military base near Baotou, Inner Mongolia.

By spring 2014, it became increasingly clear that Zhou's spheres of influence – the oil sector, Sichuan, the legal system, and his family members – were being methodically rounded up for investigation. However, in the absence of any official reports on Zhou himself, Chinese and international media became rife with speculation about his fate. On 2 March 2014, at a press conference of the second session of the 12th National Committee of the Chinese People's Political Consultative Conference. a reporter from Hong Kong–based South China Morning Post directly asked the spokesperson if he could provide more information on the rumours circulating about the Zhou Yongkang case. In response, the spokesman Lu Xinhua chuckled and said, "like you, I've seen some stories on a select few media outlets," he then recited a prepared party-line reply, then ended his response with a smile, "this is really all I can say in response to your question, I think you know what I mean" (你懂的). Afterwards, the assembled press gallery burst into laughter. The South China Morning Post responded to a reporter's question about whether he had been arranged by relevant parties to ask this question beforehand. Official media began to use the "you know what I mean" special feature to refer to the big tigers.

Following the announcement of the investigation of Ji Wenlin, then vice governor of Hainan, on 18 February 2014, Shen Dingcheng, then secretary of the Party Committee of CNPC International, was taken away for investigation before the Spring Festival in February 2014. Thus, all five secretaries of Zhou Yongkang during his time at CNPC, the Ministry of Land and Resources, Sichuan, and the Ministry of Public Security, including Guo Yongxiang, former chairman of the Sichuan Federation of Literary and Art Circles, Li Hualin, former vice president of CNPC, and Li Chongxi, former chairman of the Sichuan CPPCC, who were detained in 2013, have fallen from grace. On the same day, The New York Times reported that the CCDI detained Liang Ke, then director of the Beijing State Security Bureau, in January 2014, and the investigation into him also involved Zhou Yongkang.

In May 2014, Bo Qiliang, a senior official of CNPC who had violated regulations by promoting Jia Xiaoye's younger sister, was investigated. In June 2014, Su Rong, a vice-state-level official who served as vice chairman of the Chinese People's Political Consultative Conference, was arrested. Media outlets such as Duowei News and Mingjing News reported that Su Rong was one of the main members of Zhou Yongkang's group. On 2 July 2014, Yu Gang was expelled from the Party and dismissed from public office. Chinese media pointed out without naming Yu Gang that he had served as Zhou Yongkang's secretary. Jia Xiaoxia, an aunt of Zhou Bin, a senior executive of PetroChina's Canadian branch, resigned and disappeared. On 16 July 2014, after Bo Qiliang was investigated, Song Yiwu, deputy general manager of CNPC Overseas Exploration and Development Company, and Li Zhiming, the actual person in charge of CNPC in Canada, were suspected of being related to the Zhou Yongkang family case and were recently taken away for investigation.

=== Arrest and expulsion from the CCP ===
Xinhua News Agency, the country's principal state news agency, released a report on 29 July 2014, announcing the formal launch of an investigation into Zhou Yongkang. This was the first time that the investigation into Zhou Yongkang had been publicly confirmed by Chinese official channels. The article formally announced that an internal party investigation against Zhou Yongkang's "violations of party discipline" had started, but did not mention any criminal wrongdoing. The news of Zhou Yongkang's downfall differed from the news of other officials' downfall, and some analysts believe that:

1. The report did not mention "illegal activities", only "disciplinary violations". The "disciplinary violations" refer to the decision made from the perspective of disciplinary action, indicating that the procuratorate has not yet intervened in the investigation of Zhou Yongkang.
2. The report did not use the word "investigation" but rather "review", which implies a lengthy investigation process.
3. The fact that the word " comrade " was not used in the announcement proves that the matter is true and has undergone the corresponding investigation process.

The report pointed out that during Zhou Yongkang's tenure as a leader of China National Petroleum Corporation, the Ministry of Land and Resources, the Secretary of the Sichuan Provincial Party Committee, and the Secretary of the Central Political and Legal Affairs Commission,

- He seriously violated Party discipline, abused his power, committed serious errors, and bears significant responsibility.
- He abused his power to seek benefits for others and accepted huge bribes directly and through his family members.
- He abused his power, and his son, Zhou, used his position to seek benefits for others, while his family members accepted huge amounts of money and valuables from others.
- Having or maintaining improper sexual relations with multiple women;
- Violating organizational and personnel discipline, resulting in serious consequences;
- Suspected of embezzling huge amounts of state-owned assets;
- Protecting and condoning organized crime groups.

The report said that Zhou Yongkang's actions have caused serious consequences, greatly damaged the reputation of the People's Republic of China, had a very bad influence at home and abroad, and caused great losses to the People's Republic of China. The Political Bureau of the CCP Central Committee decided, in accordance with the relevant provisions of the Constitution of the Chinese Communist Party and the Regulations on Disciplinary Sanctions of the Chinese Communist Party, to expel Zhou Yongkang from the Party, pending ratification by the fourth plenary session of the 18th CCP Central Committee. The fourth plenary session of the 18th CCP Central Committee was held in Beijing from 20 to 23 October 2014.

Several months later, the party investigation concluded that Zhou abused his power for the illicit gain of his family, friends, and associates, took "large amounts in bribes personally and through his family and associates; abused his power to further the interests of his family, mistresses, and associates; committed adultery with multiple women and engaged in the exchange of money and favors for sex; and leaked state and party secrets". State media announced Zhou's arrest to face criminal proceedings on 5 December 2014. He was expelled from the Chinese Communist Party. Zhou was the first Politburo Standing Committee member to be expelled from the party since the fall of the Gang of Four in 1980 after the Cultural Revolution. At midnight on 6 December 2014, Xinhua News Agency reported that the Politburo had reviewed and approved the "Report on the Investigation of Zhou Yongkang's Serious Violations of Discipline" by the CCDI on 5 December, and decided to expel Zhou Yongkang from the Party and transfer his suspected crimes and clues to the judicial organs for handling according to law. The report stated:

An investigation revealed that Zhou Yongkang seriously violated the Party's political, organizational, and confidentiality disciplines; abused his position to seek illegal benefits for multiple individuals, directly or through family members, accepting huge bribes; abused his power to help relatives, mistresses, and friends engage in business activities and obtain enormous profits, causing significant losses to state-owned assets; leaked Party and state secrets; seriously violated regulations on integrity and self-discipline, accepting large amounts of money and property from others himself and his relatives; and committed adultery with multiple women and engaged in power-for-sex and money-for-sex transactions. The investigation also uncovered other suspected criminal leads against Zhou Yongkang. Zhou Yongkang's actions completely deviated from the Party's nature and purpose, seriously violated Party discipline, severely damaged the Party's image, caused significant losses to the cause of the Party and the people, and had an extremely negative impact.

=== Wealth ===
Reuters quoted sources as saying that from the end of 2013 to the end of March 2014, the CCP detained or interrogated more than 300 of Zhou Yongkang's family members and confidants, and froze or confiscated at least renminbi 90 billion in assets. The report quoted sources as saying that the procuratorate and anti-corruption departments searched multiple locations in seven provincial-level administrative regions, including Beijing, Liaoning, Jiangsu, Shandong, Shanghai and Guangdong, and seized about 326 luxury homes. They found a large amount of renminbi and foreign currency cash, gold, antiques, famous paintings and famous wines, including more than 42 kilograms of gold, gold coins and silver. There was even an "armory" with 27 guns of various types and more than 10,000 rounds of ammunition. By March 2014, Chinese authorities were reported to have seized assets worth at least ¥90 billion renminbi ($14.5 billion) from Zhou's family members and associates.

Zhou's family reportedly made billions of dollars by investing in the oil industry, of which Zhou had headed the largest company, China National Petroleum Corp. According to the Hong Kong–based Apple Daily, Zhou's eldest son made more than US$1.6 billion from public works in the city of Chongqing alone. He also supposedly used his father's prominence to extort millions of dollars in protection fees from various businesses and organizations.

== Trial and sentencing ==
At 9:00 AM on 3 April 2015, the website of the CCDI announced that the investigation into Zhou Yongkang's case had been completed by the Supreme People's Procuratorate and, upon designation of jurisdiction, transferred to the First Branch of the Tianjin Municipal People's Procuratorate for review and prosecution. On the same day, the First Branch of the Tianjin Municipal People's Procuratorate filed a public prosecution against Zhou Yongkang with the Tianjin First Intermediate People's Court on charges of bribery, abuse of power, and intentional disclosure of state secrets. The indictment alleged that: "During his tenure as Vice General Manager of China National Petroleum Corporation, Secretary of the Sichuan Provincial Committee of the Chinese Communist Party, Member of the Political Bureau of the CCP Central Committee, Minister of Public Security, State Councilor, and Member of the Standing Committee of the Political Bureau of the CCP Central Committee and Secretary of the Central Political and Legal Affairs Commission, the defendant Zhou Yongkang took advantage of his position to seek benefits for others and illegally accepted huge amounts of money and property from others; abused his power, causing significant losses to public property, national and people's interests, and causing a bad social impact, with particularly serious circumstances; violated the provisions of the Law on Guarding State Secrets by intentionally leaking state secrets, with particularly serious circumstances, and should be held criminally liable for bribery, abuse of power and intentional leaking of state secrets."

In the days leading up to the anticipated trial, Supreme Court President Zhou Qiang (of no relation) told an assembled international press conference that Zhou Yongkang's trial would be "open and in accordance with the law". In April 2015, Zhou Yongkang was formally charged with abuse of power, bribery, and intentionally leaking state secrets, and scheduled to face trial at the Tianjin First Intermediate People's Court. Overseas Chinese media were rife with speculation about the 'treatment' Zhou was to receive. However, Zhou's trial unexpectedly took place behind closed doors. On 11 June, state media made an announcement – without any apparent warning – that Zhou's verdict had already been reached. The official report on Zhou's trial was brief and stated that he had been convicted on all three charges. The legal sentence, according to the state, was life in prison for bribery, seven years for abuse of power, and four years for "leaking state secrets". The court decided that Zhou could serve prison terms concurrently and amalgamated the sentences into one 'combined' life sentence. The total value of bribes taken by Zhou and his family was said to be ¥129.7 million renminbi (~$18.87 million). State television showed Zhou pleading guilty with a head of fully gray hair, in contrast to his combed jet black hair dye he was known for before his retirement. Due to the involvement of state secrets, the trial was not held in public. Zhou Yongkang stated in court that all the evidence of the above-mentioned crimes was true and he had no objection. He accepted the court's judgment and would not appeal.

Overseas media had compared Zhou's trial to that of Bo Xilai two years earlier, which was noted for being unusually open. In contrast to Bo, Zhou did not appear to dispute his charges. Bo, for the most part, denied his guilt and blamed much of the misdeeds he was accused of on his associates and his family. Zhou, on the other hand, said that "they tried to bribe my family, but really they were after my power. I should assume major responsibility for this". Xinhua News Agency said that the trial took place in secret because state secrets were involved in the case. However, it was also likely that Zhou's trial was not open to the public as a result of the sensitivity of the subject matter and its political implications. Observers also cited that the Bo trial became "out of control" as Bo made many shocking revelations during the deliberation of his trial, which became tabloid fodder and led to many rumours circulating on social media, making the authorities more risk-averse to do the same with Zhou.

Zhou's son, Zhou Bin, fled to the U.S. in early 2013 and returned after negotiations with Chinese authorities. In June 2016, Zhou Bin was found guilty of taking ¥222 million renminbi ($34 million) in bribes and illegally trading in restricted commodities, and ¥350 million renminbi ($53 million) of illicit gains were confiscated; Zhou's wife, Jia Xiaoyue, was fined ¥1 million renminbi ($150,000) for bribe-taking. Zhou's son and wife were sentenced to 18 years and 9 years imprisonment respectively.

== Reactions ==
The provincial party committees of 18 provinces in China held meetings and published their support for the central government's investigation of Zhou Yongkang on the front page of their party newspapers. Among them, Shaanxi and Guizhou expressed their support on 31 July; Anhui, Shanxi, Henan, Hainan and Hebei on 1 August; Sichuan, Jilin, Hunan and Hubei on 2 August; Tibet Autonomous Region and Heilongjiang on 3 August; Yunnan, Gansu and Liaoning on 4 August; and Jiangsu on 5 August. The People's Liberation Army and People's Armed Police also announced their support for the investigation. On August 17, Qinghai supported the central government's handling of Zhou Yongkang and was the last province to express its support. By this time, all 31 provinces, municipalities and autonomous regions in China had expressed their support for the central government. Departments that Zhou Yongkang once controlled expressed their support for taking action against him, including the Central Political and Legal Affairs Commission, the national political and legal cadres, the Ministry of Justice, China National Petroleum Corporation, the Supreme People's Court and the Supreme People's Procuratorate.

After the announcement of Zhou's expulsion from the party, the party's official newspaper People's Daily editorialized that Zhou's expulsion was part of the "strong resolve" to stamp out corruption in the party by General Secretary Xi Jinping. The editorial said the case demonstrated that the party saw "everyone as equal in the eyes of the law". It said that Zhou "betrayed the essence and mission of the party" and that "corruption in the party is like fire and water". Media outlets outside of mainland China speculated about the political reasons behind Zhou's downfall. He Pin (何频), the chief editor of the overseas Chinese news portal Mingjing News, went one step further and asserted plainly that Zhou fell because he was engaged in a political conspiracy to depose Xi Jinping.

In contrast, The New York Times did not speculate on political reasons behind Zhou's arrest, simply writing that ordinary Chinese people may be alarmed that the legal system was once in the hands of a deeply corrupt politician. Duowei News expressed disappointment with mainstream Western media characterization of the event as "yet another political purge", asserting that seeing modern China, particularly the post-Xi Communist Party, as rife with political intrigue and full of backroom deals is imprecise and naive. Duowei stated that Western media had a very poor grasp of what Xi was trying to achieve, and that Zhou's downfall was but a small element of a larger campaign by Xi Jinping to clean up the party, institutionalize power structures, and re-build the party's legitimacy.
