= Shen Dingcheng =

Chinese businessman

- 沈定成
- Born: Dazhu County, Sichuan, China
- Education: Southwest Petroleum University
- Occupations: CCP Committee Secretary and Vice-President of PetroChina International (2007–2014); Vice President of China National United Oil Corporation (1997–2002)
- Political party: Chinese Communist Party

Shen Dingcheng (Chinese: 沈定成; pinyin: Shěn Dìngchéng) is a Chinese businessman and oil and gas executive. He served as the Vice President of China National United Oil Corporation (中国联合石油有限责任公司) and PetroChina International (中国石油国际事业有限公司) between 1997 and 2002, and later Chinese Communist Party Committee Secretary of PetroChina International between 2007 and 2014.

Shen graduated from Southwestern Petroleum University in Chengdu, where he majored in oil and gas storage and transportation. Chinese-language media have described Shen, Li Hualin, Guo Yongxiang, and Ji Wenlin as the "Four Secretaries of Zhou Yongkang". In March 1992, Shen Dingcheng replaced Li Hualin as Zhou Yongkang's secretary while Li was promoted to China National Petroleum's Houston office in the United States. In February 2014, Shen was reported "missing," suspected of being placed under investigation as part of the Zhou Yongkang case. At around the same time, several other former aides of Zhou Yongkang were detained for investigation.
