= Tan Hong =

Chinese politician

Tan Hong 谈红
- Occupation: Security official
- Known for: Secretary of Zhou Yongkang
- Political party: Chinese Communist Party (expelled)

Tan Hong
- Traditional Chinese: 談紅
- Simplified Chinese: 谈红
Transcriptions
Standard Mandarin
- Hanyu Pinyin: Tan Hong

Tan Hong is a former Chinese official, and one of the top aides to disgraced Politburo Standing Committee member Zhou Yongkang. He was a senior officer in the guard bureau of the Ministry of Public Security, while Zhou Yongkang served as the Minister. In June 2014, Tan was being investigated for "alleged involvement in bribery". On 2 July 2014, Tan was expelled from the Chinese Communist Party; his alleged offenses included accepting bribes and seeking personal gain from his position of power. Other former associates of Zhou Yongkang, including Tan Li (no relation), Yu Gang, and Ji Wenlin were also investigated.
