= De Prefecture (Liao dynasty) =

Historical administrative division in Inner Mongolia, China

Dezhou or De Prefecture (Chinese: 德州) was a zhou (prefecture) of the Khitan-ruled Liao dynasty of China centering on modern Liangcheng County, Inner Mongolia, China. It was created in 1019.
