= Keith Zhai =

Chinese journalist

- Born: China
- Education: Carlton University
- Occupation: company executive

Keith Zhai is a journalist and senior correspondent for The Wall Street Journal. He was part of the winning team from the staff of Thomson Reuters that received the Pulitzer finalist for International Reporting in 2020 for coverage of the Hong Kong protests.

Zhai received multiple awards from The Society of Publishers in Asia (SOPA) in 2013 and 2014 for his coverage of the 18th National Congress of the Chinese Communist Party, the probe against China's former security tsar Zhou Yongkang, and political high-flyer Bo Xilai.

== Education ==
Zhai has a master's degree in journalism from Carlton University in Ottawa, Canada. While there, he worked in a local media. He also studied Mass Communication at Carleton University and minored in Japanese studies.

== Career ==
Zhai serves a senior correspondent for The Wall Street Journal. He covers China and its impact on the world. His journalistic research is used by experts to provide testimony and proposals to the United States Congress in regards to the country's affairs with Asia and China.

In 2013 and 2014, Zhai received multiple awards from The Society of Publishers in Asia (SOPA) for his coverage of the 18th National Congress of the Chinese Communist Party, the probe against China's former security tsar Zhou Yongkang and political high-flyer Bo Xilai.

Later He joined Ant Financials as a senior communication manager.

In 2020, Zhai was part of the winning team from the staff of Thomson Reuters that received the Pulitzer finalist for International Reporting. They received the award for their coverage of the Hong Kong protests that provided readers with "deeply-reported, original dispatches from the Hong Kong protests, a battleground between democracy and autocracy that detailed China's grip behind the scenes and offered valuable insights into the forces that will shape the next century."

In 2021, Zhai was part of a team of the Journal reporters that received The Malcolm Forbes Award at the 83rd Annual Overseas Press Club Awards.

Later he quit from journalism and works in AI industry
