= Hajan (Irgen Gioro) =

Hajan (Manchu: ᡥᠠᠵᠠᠨ, romanized: Hajan; d. 1686) was a Qing dynasty official and military commander of the Irgen Gioro clan of Yehe and assigned to the Manchu Plain Blue Banner. He served as Viceroy of Shaanxi (陝西總督), Viceroy of Sichuan and Shaanxi (川陝總督), Ministers of War, Rites, and took part in suppressing the Revolt of the Three Feudatories.

== Biography ==
Hajan entered official service as an imperial academy student and was appointed Director of Ceremonies in the Court of State Ceremonial. He later served as Judicial Commissioner for the Ministry of War, Academician of the Secretariat, and Deputy Minister of War (兵部侍郎). In 1673, he was appointed Viceroy of Shaanxi. Shortly after taking office, the Revolt of the Three Feudatories broke out. Wu Sangui's commanders Wang Pingfan (王屏藩), Zheng Jiaolin (鄭蛟麟), and Wu Zhimao (呉之茂) occupied Sichuan and planned an invasion of Shaanxi. In 1674, the Kangxi Emperor appointed Grand Secretary Moro as Imperial Commissioner for Shaanxi and ordered that all major matters be discussed with Hajan before implementation. Hajan pointed out that the mountain roads between Hanzhong and Guangyuan were extremely difficult terrains, and proposed building boats to transport military provisions through the waterways of Lüeyang. In the same year, Wang Fuchen rebelled at Ningqiang, killed Grand Secretary Moro, and cut the Qing's supply lines, forcing Qing's main forces to withdraw from Hanzhong back to Xi'an.

In 1675, the Kangxi Emperor ordered Hajan to divide his troops to defend Lanzhou, but Hajan argued that Xi'an lacked sufficient troops and urging that all available forces be concentrated on defending Xi'an. Subsequently, Wang Fuchen's rebel forces captured Lanzhou and Yan'an not long after. Around the same time, the Qing's commander Wang Kecheng of Xing'an also revolted. Hajan redeployed Green Standard troops from Tongguan to Shangzhou and transferred Manchu Banner troops from Xi'an to Tongguan. However, when the rebels from Xing'an captured Shangzhou and marched toward Xi'an, Hajan requested reinforcements from Prince and General Donggo. The Kangxi Emperor rebuked him for focusing solely on the defense of Xi'an and failing to carry out the imperial strategy of dispersing forces to all key strongholds. However, the emperor still transferred General Udan from Taiyuan to Tongguan and ordered Mongol cavalries from Yulin under Laduhu to reinforce Xi'an.

In 1676, Grand Secretary Tuhai replaced Donggo as commander-in-chief and besieged Pingliang, eventually pressured Wang Fuchen's surrender to the Qing. Hajan then recommending the throne that the surrendered troops and civilians be rearranged and that civil administration be restored. In 1680, General Zhao Liangdong occupied Chengdu and Wang Jinbao took over Baoning, enabling the Qing to secure its position in Sichuan. Hajan was then ordered to advance from Baoning and work toward the recovery of Yunnan, and took the position as the Viceroy of Sichuan and Shaanxi. He subsequently pursued the rebel commanders Tan Hong (譚弘) and Peng Shiheng (彭時亨), and attacked the forces of Ma Jinbao (馬進宝) in Guizhou. Tan Hong was eventually killed in battle, while Peng Shiheng and Ma Jinbao were forced to surrender to the Qing. As a result, Qing forces were able to complete the strategical encirclement of Yunnan. Because the army was getting large as more reinforcing troops came to Yunnan resulting insufficient provisions, Hajan later withdrew his forces back to Sichuan following the instruction of Kangxi Emperor. For his success in defeating Peng Shiheng and other rebel commanders, he was granted the acting Minister of War.

In 1683, Hajan was formally appointed Minister of War, and in 1685 he was transferred as the Minister of Rites. Soon afterward, he requested retirement stating that years of military service had ruined his health. The Kangxi Emperor refused the request, reprimanded him for not yet having achieved sufficiently distinguished merit, and ordered him to redouble his efforts to redeem his shortcomings. Hajan died of illness the following year, in 1686.

One of Hajan's daughters was the formal consort of the imperial clansman and general Ecili.
