= Sun Jinsheng =

Chinese drilling engineer

- 孙金声
- Born: 1 January 1965 (age 61); Yudu County, Jiangxi, China
- Education: Jiangxi Normal University; Nankai University; Southwest Petroleum University
- Scientific career
- Fields: Drilling engineering
- Workplaces: China National Petroleum Corporation; China University of Petroleum

Chinese name
- Simplified Chinese: 孙金声
- Traditional Chinese: 孫金聲
Transcriptions
Standard Mandarin
- Hanyu Pinyin: Sūn Jīnshēng

Sun Jinsheng (born 1 January 1965) is a Chinese drilling engineer who is a researcher at the China National Petroleum Corporation and a professor of China University of Petroleum, and an academician of the Chinese Academy of Engineering.

== Biography ==
Sun was born in Yudu County, Jiangxi, on 1 January 1965. In 1981, he attended Jiangxi Normal University where he received his bachelor's degree in chemistry in 1985. After completing his master's degree in organic chemistry at Nankai University, he attended Southwest Petroleum University where he obtained his doctor's degree in applied chemistry in 2006.

Sun was despatched to PetroChina Exploration and Development Research Institute as an engineer in 1988, what he was promoted to senior engineer in 1995 and to deputy director in 2006. In August 2016, he was hired as a professor of China University of Petroleum.

== Honours and awards ==
- 2009 State Science and Technology Progress Award (Second Class)
- 2012 State Science and Technology Progress Award (Second Class)
- 2013 Science and Technology Innovation Award of the Ho Leung Ho Lee Foundation
- 2014 Foreign Member of the Russian Academy of Natural Sciences
- 2014 Foreign Member of the Russian Academy of Engineering
- 2016 State Technological Invention Award (Second Class)
- 27 November 2017 Member of the Chinese Academy of Engineering (CAE)
