= Tan Li =

Chinese politician

- 谭力

Executive Vice-Governor of Hainan
- In office May 2012 – July 2014
- Governor: Jiang Dingzhi
- Preceded by: Jiang Dingzhi
- Succeeded by: Mao Chaofeng

Head of the Hainan Provincial Propaganda Department of the Communist Party
- In office March 2009 – May 2012
- Preceded by: Zhou Wenbin (周文彬)
- Succeeded by: Xu Jun (许俊)

Communist Party Secretary of Mianyang
- In office December 2004 – March 2009
- Preceded by: Huang Xuejiu (黄学玖)
- Succeeded by: Wu Jingping (吴靖平)

Communist Party Secretary of Guang'an
- In office March 2001 – December 2004
- Preceded by: Luo Songbai (罗松柏)
- Succeeded by: Wang Ping (王平)

Communist Party Secretary of Pi County
- In office September 1995 – October 1997

Personal details
- Born: October 1955 (age 70–71) Chongqing, China
- Party: Chinese Communist Party (1987–2014; expelled)
- Education: Chongqing Normal University

Chinese name
- Traditional Chinese: 譚力
- Simplified Chinese: 谭力
Transcriptions
Standard Mandarin
- Hanyu Pinyin: Tán Lì

Tan Li (Chinese: 谭力; born October 1955) is a former Chinese politician who spent most of his career in Sichuan and Hainan provinces. Tan served in prominent municipal posts in Sichuan, first as Communist Party Secretary of Guang'an, then Party Secretary of Mianyang. He was subsequently transferred to take charge of party propaganda in Hainan Province, then became Vice Governor of Hainan beginning in 2010.

In 2014, Tan was subject to a corruption investigation by the Communist Party's internal disciplinary body. His Hainan colleague Ji Wenlin was also implicated with corruption. Tan was removed from office in July 2014. He has been linked to disgraced security tsar Zhou Yongkang.

== Biography ==
=== Early life ===
Tan was born and raised in Chongqing, where he graduated from Chongqing Normal University.

During the Down to the Countryside Movement, Tan worked as a sent-down youth in Changning County, Sichuan. After the resumption of university entrance examination, Tan was admitted to Chongqing Normal University and received a degree on political history. After college, he was assigned to Yibin department of education, and later a provincial party-run school. He taught administrative management. He was given the title of "professor" in December 1992.

In September 1995, Tan was appointed the Communist Party Secretary of Pi County, a position he held until May 1998. He then worked as the head of the Chengdu propaganda department. In March 2001, Tan was transferred to Guang'an as the Party Secretary, then he was transferred laterally to serve as party chief in Mianyang in December 2004, where he served until March 2009.

=== Mianyang, Sichuan earthquake ===
The 2008 Sichuan earthquake struck the province in May 2008. Mianyang was particularly hard hit. The region was given special attention by the central government; both General Secretary and President Hu Jintao as well as Premier Wen Jiabao visited the region in the aftermath of the earthquake. In a widely circulated photo, Tan was seen smiling in the entourage of the Premier. In a television broadcast, Tan was also seen smiling amid the debris. Tan's smiling during the most destructive earthquake to hit the country since 1976 generated significant criticism online; internet users dubbed him "Tan Xiaoxiao" (谭笑笑, literally "the laughing Tan") or the "Smiling Secretary" (微笑书记).

Tan responded to his critics during a media interview, "I don't think people know the truth... behind that incident. The General Secretary and the Premier were both visiting, I was greeting them. I was happy to see them, of course I wanted to smile." He also said that he faced immense stress coordinating the response to the earthquake, and that "as a public official, you need to withstand this stress [from the criticism], otherwise it will affect the work of the earthquake rescue activities. I'm the party secretary, like any politician, criticism comes with the job.

In the aftermath of the earthquake, Tan lived in a makeshift office, on the first floor, and slept on a sofa. Southern Weekend reported that Tan would scream and cry at night due to dealing with too much stress. Tan later received a medal of distinction from the central authorities for "exemplary work during the rescue efforts of the Sichuan earthquake." He was praised for the construction of permanent housing for locals in the aftermath of the earthquake, as well as the treatment of the water in a local lake which was affected by the earthquake.

Tan's term in Mianyang has also been marred with rumours that his second wife, a television host, had business interests which benefitted from government contracts aimed at increasing green space in Mianyang. His wife was made an official in Beichuan County, one of the places hardest hit by the earthquake, shortly after the earthquake struck. She then worked for the provincial Red Cross. A Caijing investigation also concluded that Tan took bribes from local businessman Liu Han (刘汉); Tan was said to have received several million yuan in gifts during the wedding reception of his daughter.

=== Hainan ===
In March 2009, Tan was elevated to lead the Communist Party's provincial propaganda department in Hainan province. This was a promotion that elevated him from the prefecture level to a provincial-level leadership body. During a meeting of the Hainan government where Tan's transfer was announced, one of the provincial government leaders showered Tan with praise, remarking, "this marks a strengthening of talent in the Hainan provincial government." He was elected as Vice-Governor of Hainan in January 2010.

== Downfall ==
On July 8, 2014, it was announced that Tan was undergoing investigation by the Central Commission for Discipline Inspection of the Chinese Communist Party for "serious violations of laws and regulations", in a case that was tied to the corruption investigation of Ji Wenlin, another provincial official in Hainan. According to state media, Tan's offenses included accepting bribes, extramarital relationships, and engaging in "lavish meals, karaoke, and other expensive pastimes." Both Tan Li and Ji Wenlin had at one point worked under then-Sichuan Party Secretary Zhou Yongkang. One day after state media announced the investigation into Zhou, Tan was removed from office.

Tan was expelled from the Communist Party in September 2014. On October 13, 2016, Tan was sentenced to life in prison after being found guilty of bribery in Guangzhou People's Intermediate Court.

== Personal life ==
Tan was twice married. His second wife worked as a television host for Mianyang Television.

Party political offices
Preceded by Luo Songbai	Communist Party Secretary of Guang'an; 2001–2004	Succeeded by Wang Ping
Preceded by Huang Xuejiu	Communist Party Secretary of Mianyang; 2004–2009	Succeeded by Wu Jingping
Preceded by Zhou Wenbin	Head of the Hainan Provincial Propaganda Department of the Communist Party; 2009–2012	Succeeded by Xu Jun
Government offices
Preceded by Jiang Dingzhi	Executive Vice-Governor of Hainan; 2012–2014	Succeeded by Mao Chaofeng
