= Luo Gan =

Chinese politician

- 罗干

Secretary of the Central Political and Legal Affairs Commission
- In office March 27, 1998 – October 22, 2007
- General Secretary: Jiang Zemin; Hu Jintao
- Preceded by: Ren Jianxin
- Succeeded by: Zhou Yongkang

Personal details
- Born: July 18, 1935 (age 90) Jinan, Shandong, Republic of China
- Party: Chinese Communist Party

Luo Gan
- Traditional Chinese: 羅幹
- Simplified Chinese: 罗干
Transcriptions
Standard Mandarin
- Hanyu Pinyin: Luó Gàn

Luo Gan (simplified Chinese: 罗干; traditional Chinese: 羅幹; born July 18, 1935) is a retired Chinese politician. Between 2002 and 2007, Luo was one of China's top leaders, serving as a member of the nine-man Politburo Standing Committee of the Chinese Communist Party, and as the Secretary of the Central Political and Legal Affairs Commission (Zhengfawei), which became one of China's most powerful political offices, and well-funded bureaucracies, during Luo's term. In his Zhengfawei role, Luo held oversight for many law-enforcement institutions, including the police, public security officers, armed police, labor camps, prisons, and the judicial system. Luo retired from politics in 2007.

== Early career ==
Luo Gan was born in Jinan, Shandong province. In 1953, he began studying engineering at the Beijing Steel and Iron Institute. A year later, he was selected as part of a Chinese contingent to go study at Karl Marx University in Leipzig, East Germany where he studied German language. He interned at the Leipzig steel and metalworks plant. He then continued studying machine works at Technische Universität Bergakademie Freiberg. Luo joined the Chinese Communist Party in 1960, while still in Germany. It was said that Luo had stellar grades and won the Agricola prize for academic achievement while studying in Germany.

Upon returning to China, Luo continued to work in the steel industry, first being sent to the First Ministry of Machine-Building, a state-run department in charge of machines, telecommunications, and shipbuilding. There he worked as a technician and project leader in its mechanics department. As a technical specialist, Luo, like many others in his field, were displaced from their posts during much of the Cultural Revolution, and sent to perform manual labour at a May 7 Cadre School. In 1970, Luo returned to work in Henan province, working for a government machine-building project in Luohe, then transferred to Zhengzhou.

== Rise to power ==
In October 1978, as part of a nationwide reshuffle following the demise of the Gang of Four, former First Machine-Building minister Duan Junyi took on the post of party chief of central Henan Province. While in Henan, Duan was eager to promote his former associates, including Luo Gan. In 1980, Luo was made head of the provincial science and technology commission, and also a leader in the provincial trade office. A year later, Luo was made Vice Governor of Henan.

In 1983, Luo was sent to Beijing and became deputy chairman of the All-China Federation of Trade Unions, the state-sponsored trade union group. As a major leader of the ACFTU, Luo was in charge of the day-to-day management of the organization. As a result of his tenure in the union, Luo was made Minister of Labour in March 1988. In December 1988, Luo took over duties of the Secretary-General of the State Council as a result of the illness of his predecessor Chen Junsheng.

During his term as a minister, Luo had developed a close relationship with Li Peng came to be considered one of Li's protégés. Luo was appointed a State Councilor, a position with equivalent rank but slightly lesser responsibility compared as a Vice-Premier, in 1993. He served in the position until 2003. In September 1997 at the 15th Party Congress, Luo advanced further, being named a Secretary of the Central Secretariat, the Secretary of the Central Political and Legal Affairs Commission (Zhengfawei), and a member of the 15th Politburo of the Chinese Communist Party, joining the inner sanctum of party leaders.

Luo oversaw a diverse portfolio with jurisdiction over law enforcement and internal security, as well as "comprehensive social management", a nebulous new phrase that essentially meant asserting control and preventing organized protests and social disturbances; as part of his responsibilities, he was tasked by Jiang Zemin to head the 610 Office, an extrajudicial organ established to suppress the spiritual group Falun Gong. As a result of his role, Luo faced heavy criticism from Falun Gong adherents.

== Standing Committee ==
Luo entered the Politburo Standing Committee in 2002, at the 16th National Congress of the Chinese Communist Party at the age of 67. The Standing Committee was expanded from seven members to nine in 2002, some say as a result of then-Party General Secretary Jiang Zemin attempting to stack the body with his supporters. Luo, then branded by overseas media as an associate of Li Peng, became a major beneficiary of this increase in membership. That he held a seat on the nation's highest ruling council, coupled with the relative weakness of the new party General Secretary Hu Jintao, as well as the general focus placed by the Communist Party on internal security and combating dissent to party authority, vastly increased the power of the Central Political and Legal Affairs Commission. Regarded as the "security chief" of the country, Luo implemented the "strike hard" campaign against extremism in Xinjiang and against organised crime, increasing the harshness of sentences; some suggest that this policy led to increased executions; it was said that Luo had personally directed the suppression of "illegal organisations" such as the Falun Gong movement and protests such as that at the Pubugou Dam protest in 2004.

Luo's term as the chief of the Central Political and Legal Affairs Commission was also characterized by proponents of the Weiquan movement as having further solidified party control over legal and judicial affairs, and thus impeding progress on human rights and legal freedoms. During his tenure, Luo was seen to have warned party officials to rein in judicial independence and but also pay heed to the international implications of legal activities in China, while also expanding "rule by law".

Luo retired from the Politburo Standing Committee at the age of 72, after the 17th Party Congress in October 2007. By 2007, rules related to mandated retirement age have been largely entrenched within the Communist Party hierarchy. Luo, as the oldest member of the Standing Committee by that time, naturally must retire. His Zhengfawei portfolio was then inherited by Zhou Yongkang, a former oil baron who went on to oversee an even greater expansion of powers of the portfolio. Zhou was eventually convicted on corruption charges and sentenced to prison in 2015.

Luo largely disappeared from the public eye following his retirement in 2007. In 2015, the Chinese authorities published Luo Gan on Law and Politics Work in China (罗干谈政法综治工作), a compilation of Luo's thoughts on law enforcement work during his tenure. Luo also made a public appearance at the 2015 China Victory Day Parade.

On December 17, 2009, Argentinian Federal Judge Octavio Araoz de Lamadrid issued a national and international Interpol warrant for the detention of Luo Gan, along with Jiang Zemin. The warrant was issued with basis on the investigation of 17 testimonies of Falun Gong practitioners victims of persecution, along with reports by Human Rights Watch, Amnesty International, and the UN detailed in case Nº 17885/2005.

Government offices
Preceded by Ma Wenrui	Minister of Labor; 1988	Succeeded by Ruan Chongwu
Party political offices
Preceded by Ren Jianxin	Secretary of the Central Political and Legal Affairs Commission; 1998–2007	Succeeded by Zhou Yongkang
Order of precedence
Preceded by Li Changchun	9th Rank of the Chinese Communist Party; 16th Politburo Standing Committee	Succeeded by Wang Lequan (Member of the Politburo)
