= Yu Gang =

Chinese politician

- 余刚

Vice-Mayor of Heshan
- In office 2001–2002

Personal details
- Born: 1968 (age 57–58) Nan County, Yiyang, Hunan, China
- Party: Chinese Communist Party (expelled in 2014)
- Education: Renmin University of China

Chinese name
- Traditional Chinese: 余剛
- Simplified Chinese: 余刚
Transcriptions
Standard Mandarin
- Hanyu Pinyin: Yú Gāng

Yu Gang (born 1968) is a former Chinese politician and former secretary of Zhou Yongkang. Before Zhou retired in 2012 and was sent to life in prison, Yu served as the deputy director of the General Office that served the Central Politics and Law Commission, a body that Zhou headed. Yu was investigated for corruption and expelled from the Chinese Communist Party in July 2014, as part of the anti-corruption campaign against Zhou Yongkang and his associates.

== Life ==
Yu was born and raised in Nan County, Hunan. He has two brothers and one sister. In 1987, Yu was admitted to Renmin University of China, majoring in law at the School of Law. After college, Yu was assigned to the State Council of the People's Republic of China as an officer. In 2000, Yu worked as a secretary of Zhou Yongkang, who was the Minister of the Ministry of Public Security. In 2001, Yu was transferred to Heshan as the Vice-Mayor, a position he held until 2002.

On July 2, 2014, Yu was removed from office and dismissed from the Party for serious corruption.

== Personal life ==
The Radio France Internationale reported that Yu married Tang Can, who is a Chinese military singer.

== See also ==
- Liu Wei (businessman)
- Liu Han
