= Boxun =

Overseas Chinese news and community website

- Website type: Overseas Chinese community website Blog
- Available in: Chinese
- Website: www.boxun.com
- Current status: Online

Boxun (simplified Chinese: 博讯; traditional Chinese: 博訊; pinyin: Bóxùn) was an aggregation website and blog, which focused on alleged political scandals in China. Boxun was partly backed by the China Free Press project, which is partially funded by the National Endowment for Democracy, a US-funded organization.

== History ==
Boxun was created by Meicun "Watson" Meng, who studied in the United States after working for two multinational companies in China. The Boxun servers were run from an office in North Carolina since 2000. Boxun allowed anyone to submit news to the website, which has resulted in a large number of articles remaining anonymous.

== Critics ==
While the organization claimed it was independently run and audited, critics – including German leftist magazine konkret – have suggested that it was simply a tool of U.S. foreign policy. Boxun.com is blocked in mainland China.

== Defamation case ==
In 2012, Boxun falsely reported that actress Zhang Ziyi was paid $100 million to sleep with top Chinese officials. Zhang sued Boxun in a US court for defamation. In December 2013, Boxun settled the case after agreeing to pay an undisclosed amount to Zhang and issue a front-page apology.
