= Li Dongsheng =

Chinese official

Li Dongsheng 李东生

Director of the 610 Office

Vice Minister of Public Security
- In office October 2009 – 25 December 2013
- Minister: Guo Shengkun

Deputy Head of the Central Propaganda Department
- In office May 2002 – October 2009
- Head: Liu Yunshan

Personal details
- Born: December 1955 (age 70) Zhucheng, Weifang, Shandong, China
- Party: Chinese Communist Party (1986–2014, expelled)
- Education: Fudan University
- Occupation: Politician

Li Dongsheng (simplified Chinese: 李东生; traditional Chinese: 李東生; pinyin: Lǐ Dōngshēng; born in December 1955 in Zhucheng, Shandong) was a Vice Minister of China's Ministry of Public Security and a member of the Central Committee of the Chinese Communist Party. He oversaw the office in charge of suppressing the Falun Gong and other banned spiritual groups. Seen as an associate of Zhou Yongkang, Li was investigated for corruption allegations in 2013 and charged with abuse of power and bribery. In 2016, he was sentenced to 15 years in prison.

== Career ==
Li was born in Zhucheng, Weifang, Shandong in December 1955. He graduated from Fudan University in Shanghai, where he majored in journalism. After graduation, he began working for China Central Television (CCTV), where he operated cameras and was part of the reporting teams. As a journalist, he focused on politics, presumably putting him in contact with senior figures of the Chinese Communist Party and its government. He joined the CCP in March 1986. Li worked his way up the administrative ranks of CCTV, and was eventually named vice president. He was instrumental in kickstarting the Oriental Horizon program, and for much of the 1990s was responsible for overseeing the investigative journalism program Point.

In 2000, Li began his foray into the government and was named the deputy head of the State Administration of Radio, Film and Television (SARFT). In May 2002, he was appointed the Deputy Head of the Propaganda Department of the Chinese Communist Party. He was the chief official spokesperson of the 17th Party Congress in October 2007. He remained deputy head of propaganda until October 2009, when he was appointed the Deputy Minister of Public Security.

== Dismissal and expulsion from the Party ==
On December 20, 2013, the Central Commission for Discipline Inspection announced that Li Dongsheng was suspected of committing "grave violations of Party discipline and the law," and that he was undergoing investigation. This made Li the second member of the Central Committee to be investigated on corruption charges since the 18th Party Congress, when Xi Jinping became General Secretary of the Chinese Communist Party (the first to be investigated was Jiang Jiemin). Five days later, on December 25, Li Dongsheng was removed from his positions as deputy of the Leading Group on Dealing with Heterodox Religions, director of the 610 Office, and Vice Minister of Public Security.

On June 30, 2014, Xinhua announced that Li Dongsheng had been expelled from the Chinese Communist Party and transferred to judicial authorities for prosecution. He was indicted on charges of "using the convenience of his position to gain benefits for others, soliciting and accepting huge bribes."

On January 12, 2016, Li was sentenced to 15 years in prison. The total sums involved in Li's case were about 22 million yuan, or US$3.4 million.
