= Zhou Yongkang =

Chinese politician (born 1942)

- 周永康
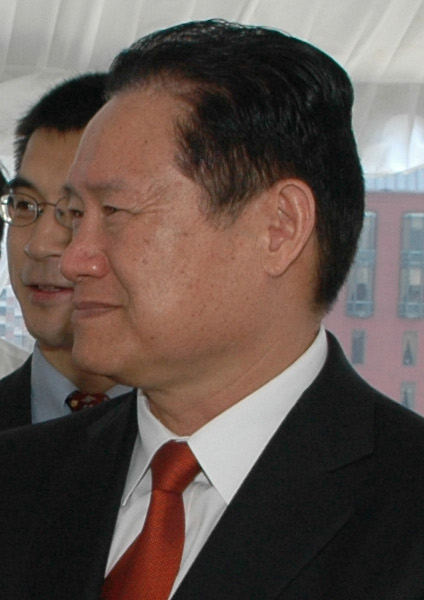
- Zhou in 2006

Secretary of the Central Political and Legal Affairs Commission
- In office October 22, 2007 – November 20, 2012
- Deputy: Wang Lequan; Meng Jianzhu
- General secretary: Hu Jintao
- Preceded by: Luo Gan
- Succeeded by: Meng Jianzhu

State Councilor of China
- In office January 19, 2003 – January 25, 2008
- Premier: Wen Jiabao

Minister of Public Security
- In office December 7, 2002 – October 28, 2007
- Premier: Wen Jiabao
- Preceded by: Jia Chunwang
- Succeeded by: Meng Jianzhu

Party Secretary of Sichuan
- In office January 6, 2000 – December 5, 2002
- Deputy: Zhang Zhongwei (governor)
- Preceded by: Xie Shijie
- Succeeded by: Zhang Xuezhong

Minister of Land and Resources
- In office March 1998 – December 1999
- Premier: Zhu Rongji
- Preceded by: Position created
- Succeeded by: Tian Fengshan

Personal details
- Born: Zhou Yuangen (周元根); December 3, 1942 (age 83) Wuxi, Jiangsu, China
- Party: Chinese Communist Party (1964–2014, expelled)
- Spouses: Wang Shuhua (1971–1997); Jia Xiaoye (2001–)
- Education: Suzhou High School; Beijing Petroleum Institute
- Occupation: Oil exploration

Zhou Yongkang
- Chinese: 周永康
Transcriptions
Standard Mandarin
- Hanyu Pinyin: Zhōu Yǒngkāng
- IPA: Mandarin pronunciation: [tʂoʊ˥ jʊŋ˧˩kaŋ˥]
Wu
- Romanization: Tzoe Yon-khân

Zhou Yongkang (Chinese: 周永康; born December 3, 1942) is a former senior leader of the Chinese Communist Party (CCP). The 17th Central Committee of the Chinese Communist Party (2007–2012) elected Zhou to be one of the nine members of the 17th Politburo Standing Committee; the highest decision-making body of the CCP, and the center of political power in the People's Republic of China. Zhou served as the Secretary of the Central Political and Legal Affairs Commission during his tenure; he oversaw China's security apparatus and law enforcement institutions, including courts, prosecution agencies, police forces, paramilitary forces, and intelligence organs until his retirement in 2012. In December 2014, Zhou was arrested on corruption-related charges and expelled from the Chinese Communist Party.

Zhou's career in the CCP was propelled by his involvement in the oil and gas industry, beginning as a technician at the Daqing Oil Field during the Cultural Revolution. He led the China National Petroleum Corporation from 1996 to 1998 before serving as Minister of Land and Natural Resources until 1999. Subsequently, Zhou became the Party Secretary of Sichuan, with Sichuan being China's second most populous province at the time. Zhou was a member of the Executive Meeting of the 10th State Council of China (2003–2008) as a State Councillor. During his tenure on the State Council, Zhou served as the Minister of Public Security, the Political Commissar of the People's Armed Police, a Secretary on the Secretariat of the Central Committee, and the Deputy Secretary of the Central Political and Legal Affairs Commission. In October 2007, the 17th Central Committee elected Zhou to the Politburo Standing Committee (PSC), where he served as the Secretary of the Central Political and Legal Affairs Commission. He retired at the 18th Party Congress in 2012.

In late 2013, Zhou was placed under investigation for alleged abuse of power and corruption, a decision publicly announced by state media in July 2014. He became the first Politburo Standing Committee member, and the highest-ranking official since the founding of the People's Republic of China, to be tried and convicted of corruption-related charges. Following his investigation, Zhou was expelled from the Chinese Communist Party (CCP). On June 11, 2015, Zhou was convicted of bribery, abuse of power, and the intentional disclosure of state secrets by the Intermediate Court in Tianjin. Zhou and his family members were said to have taken 129 million yuan (over $20 million) in bribes. He was sentenced to life in prison without parole.

== Early life ==
Zhou was born as Zhou Yuangen (Chinese: 周元根) in December 1942. He is a native of Xiqiantou Village (西前头村), Wuxi County, in Jiangsu province. Xiqiantou is located 18 kilometers (11 mi) outside Wuxi city proper. The majority of Xiqiantou residents were surnamed "Zhou". Zhou took on the surname of his mother because his father, whose surname was Lu, was a "live-in son-in-law" of his maternal grandparents. Upon joining the Zhou household when he married, his father took on his wife's surname and became known as Zhou Yisheng (周义生).

Zhou was the eldest of three sons. Zhou's family was poor; his family made a living farming and fishing for the Asian swamp eel. Zhou was sent to school with the financial assistance of his family friends. In 1954, Zhou was enrolled at one of the two top middle schools in the eastern Wuxi area. It was during this period that Zhou changed his name to "Yongkang" on the advice of his teacher, because there was another person in his class with an identical name.

Zhou excelled at school and was eventually accepted to enroll at the prestigious Suzhou High School, one of the most prominent secondary schools in the Jiangnan region. Zhou had good grades and was involved in extra-curricular activities, including the school's political ideology group as well as events promoting literacy. In 1961, after obtaining stellar results on his Gaokao exams, he was admitted to the Beijing Institute of Petroleum (now China University of Petroleum) and became the pride of his village. He majored in geophysical survey and exploration. He graduated in 1966.

In November 1964, he became a member of the Chinese Communist Party. In 1966, the Cultural Revolution ensnared Beijing's higher education institutions. Zhou was told by the authorities to "wait for an assignment" while the political struggles wreaked havoc on China's universities. He waited for a year. He joined geological survey work in north-east China in 1967, assigned to become an intern technician at factory No. 673 at the Daqing oil field. In 1970, Zhou was promoted to lead the geological survey division of a local department charged with carrying out an ambitious petroleum drilling initiative set out by the Party's top leadership.

== Career ==
Zhou worked in the oil industry from 1967 to 1998.

=== Oil exploration in Liaoning ===
In 1973, Zhou was promoted to head the Geophysical Exploration Department of the Liaohe Petroleum Exploration Bureau, located in Panjin, Liaoning. Liaohe would eventually become one of the China National Petroleum Corporation's (CNPC) largest oil fields. Zhou was seen as a hard-working and emotionally mature presence to his colleagues. He abstained from drinking and smoking, and was well known for his ability to reputedly talk unscripted for hours on end to keep his colleagues engaged.

At Liaohe, Zhou met Wang Shuhua (Chinese: 王淑华), a factory worker from Hebei province, whom he later married. As the Liaohe exploration team grew, Zhou eventually became responsible for over 2,300 employees in his department. His work consisted mainly of leading teams to unexplored, barren territory to conduct site surveys to assess the potential for future oil drilling. He was known to be great at maintaining good interpersonal relationships with his superiors and subordinates, and gained significant personal clout. During some years, Zhou did not go back to his home in Jiangsu, even during the Chinese New Year holiday period, which is a time traditionally reserved for family reunions. Instead, Zhou would visit his colleagues who were working in harsh winter conditions in remote areas. Beginning in the 1970s, Zhou would gain rapid career advancement. He owed much of his career growth to his mentors from the Beijing Institute of Petroleum, who were working in executive positions at the Liaohe oil fields at the time. In particular, the university's president was known to be fond of Zhou's skills and was eager to promote him. In 1983, with the director of the Liaohe Oil Field Management Bureau being transferred for a job in Beijing, Zhou was promoted to manage the day-to-day affairs of the oil field. Moreover, given the oil field's prominence in the municipal affairs of the city of Panjin, Zhou became concurrently the Mayor of Panjin and the city's deputy party secretary. Zhou's stint as mayor was his first major role in government.

=== National oil sector ===
In 1985, Zhou Yongkang left Liaoning for Beijing to become the Deputy Minister of the Petroleum Industry. In 1988, the ministry later folded and became a state-owned enterprise, the predecessor of the China National Petroleum Corporation (CNPC), China's largest energy company. Zhou became a member of the company's senior executive team and was named deputy general manager. In March 1989, as part of the government's overall strategy to move oil production from east to west, Zhou led an oil and gas exploration and survey team to begin work in the Tarim Basin in the Xinjiang region of far-west China, near the city of Korla.

In the mid-1990s, Zhou spearheaded CNPC's "go global" initiatives, winning bids for large projects in Sudan, Venezuela, and Kazakhstan. Zhou was particularly involved in the Sudan Nile petroleum project, including the construction of the Greater Nile Oil Pipeline, CNPC's first major project outside of China. Zhou travelled to the African country 14 times. Beginning in 1996, Zhou became general manager (chief executive) of the CNPC. As chief executive, Zhou was instrumental in the company's restructuring and the preparation of the initial public offering of the company's subsidiary, PetroChina. In October 1997, Zhou gained a seat on the Central Committee of the Communist Party, a leadership assembly of 200 top political figures of the party.

In March 1998, Zhou was elevated to become Minister of Land and Resources in Premier Zhu Rongji's cabinet. The "mega-ministry" was created after a merger of the formerly separate Ministry of Geology and Mining, the Administration of National Land, the National Administration of Oceans, and the National Surveying and Mapping Bureau. As minister, Zhou, upon finding that his staff did not have adequate housing, initiated a housing construction program for the department's engineers and senior technical staff.

=== Leading Sichuan ===
In 2000, Zhou became Party Secretary of Sichuan, the province's top political office. Sichuan was China's second most populous province at the time. Before Zhou, most of Sichuan's provincial leaders originated from the province. Zhou, an outsider, changed the province's political landscape. He spearheaded economic modernization policies, focusing on agriculture. Sichuan was known to be a province highly dependent on agriculture, and its government operated at a slower pace compared to those of China's coastal regions. Zhou was known for his quick and efficient decision-making, significantly altering the traditionally lax culture of the province's civil service.

During Zhou's tenure in Sichuan, the province's GDP grew at an average rate of 9.5% a year. One of his major achievements was securing investments from large multinationals such as Intel. The company opened a new computer chip factory near Chengdu shortly after Zhou left his post in Sichuan. He also focused on improving tourism resources, significantly revamping the Mount Emei scenic region to attract more visitors. Zhou also improved public safety in the province, for example, by enacting policies that aimed to reduce accidents in the province's water lanes. On October 20, 2000, in the spirit of attracting investment for economic development, Zhou hosted visiting Chinese and international dignitaries and businesspeople at the China Western Forum held in Chengdu. (Note: The event was noted for being a gathering of Sichuan's political and business elite at the time. Those on the guest list included Deng Hong, Li Chongxi, Ji Wenlin, Guo Yongxiang, He Huazhang, Tan Li, and Li Chuncheng. All were detained for investigation or charged with corruption related crimes fourteen years later.)

While in Sichuan, he gained a reputation for dealing firmly with any signs of dissent, coming down hard on Tibetan groups and Falun Gong.

Although Zhou left Sichuan to take up national leadership positions in Beijing in 2002, he cultivated a strong power base of patronage. The elite provincial political circles were stacked with Zhou's allies, the most notable being deputy provincial party committee Secretary Li Chongxi, Chengdu party boss Li Chuncheng, and chief administrator Guo Yongxiang. Indeed, Zhou's network of patronage in Sichuan remained a highly influential force in provincial politics until the anti-corruption campaign at the end of 2012, which saw all of Zhou's proteges fall from grace.

=== Minister of Public Security ===
Prior to the 16th Party Congress of the Chinese Communist Party in late 2002, political analysts considered Zhou a candidate for promotion to Vice Premier or a senior position within the Central Political and Legal Affairs Commission (Zhengfawei). In December 2002, following his background in the petroleum sector and administrative roles, Zhou was appointed Minister of Public Security. Concurrently, he assumed several key party and state positions, including membership in the Politburo, State Councilor, Deputy Secretaryof the Zhengfawei, First Political Commissar of the People's Armed Police (China's paramilitary police force), and Secretary of the party's Central Secretariat (the party's internal policy execution and coordination body).

Zhou's assuming the deputy secretary position at the Zhengfawei meant that his status in the Chinese domestic security system was second only to Politburo Standing Committee member Luo Gan. Zhou was the first Minister of Public Security to hold a Politburo seat since Mao's successor Hua Guofeng, a testament to the renewed importance of the domestic security portfolio. This was partially attributed to the increasingly sharp social conflict in China as a result of the wealth imbalance created by the post-Mao era economic reform policies. At the turn of the century, "mass incidents" – a catch-all euphemism that could refer to any organized or spontaneous protests of a social, political, economic, or religious nature – had become commonplace across the country. In response, Beijing mandated sweeping structural reforms that significantly elevated the status of Public Security organs across the country.

Somewhat emulating Zhou's concurrently holding party and government posts in addition to his role as Minister of Public Security, the reforms carried out during Zhou's tenure called for provincial and local police chiefs (i.e., heads of Public Security organs) to also hold membership in local party leadership councils as well as leading government posts, and, more importantly, hold a leading post in the Zhengfawei. The reforms were intended to make decisions about policing, investigations, and the court system more efficient in an era of more pronounced social conflict. However, in practice, the reforms gave party and government policymakers, who were not constitutionally empowered to serve day-to-day executive duties, an avenue to directly intervene in domestic security concerns, such as using force to crack down on "mass incidents". In addition, the Zhengfawei, which normally oversaw government policy in the courts, prosecution agencies, criminal legislation, paramilitary forces, and internal intelligence services, had combined jurisdiction over executive police organs, meaning that Zhengfawei chiefs held immense and largely unchecked legislative, executive, and judicial powers.

As Minister of Public Security, Zhou was seen as China's "national police chief". He undertook significant reforms of the country's policing system, which not only faced external pressures from a deteriorating domestic security situation but also internal dissent due to stagnant wages and lack of resources. Zhou set out mandating the construction of new office buildings to serve as police headquarters and also provided modern housing for officers. He also implemented a wide array of disciplinary regulations, including making offenses such as using firearms outside of work duties, drinking and driving, and gambling during work hours cause for dismissal. He was also said to have fired several hundred police officers from their posts due to their irresponsible drinking problems.

Zhou held high-profile "mass study sessions" in an attempt to indoctrinate officers politically on party policies. He also instituted a nationwide "professional training boot camp" intended to streamline police operations and teach officers about professional ethics, making it mandatory for rank-and-file officers to take "professional training" for half of their working day. Zhou also began a national campaign for xinfang petitioners to "speak directly with the police chief", aimed at creating a more effective means to address petitioner grievances. As part of this campaign, the number of petitions and their response rates were tied to financial and career advancement consequences for local officials. As a result, many local authorities hired thugs and private security firms to detain, harass, beat, or otherwise discourage petitioners from filing their grievances. It spawned an entire industry of private security firms specializing in petitioners, as well as an increase in the number of extrajudicial detention centres known as "black jails". With increased resources at the disposal of police departments and a higher concentration of power, law enforcement agencies often found themselves at odds with public interest; public trust in domestic security organs eroded.

=== Politburo Standing Committee ===
Zhou's time as the top official in Sichuan, the oil sector, and Public Security Minister earned him significant leadership experience and personal clout, as well as a complex network of patronage. In 2007, Zhou was transferred to fill the vacancy from Luo Gan, who retired from his leadership position as central Zhengfawei chief. With this powerful position, Zhou also gained a spot on the Politburo Standing Committee, the highest council of Communist Party rulers. With the expansion of Zhengfawei authority in the preceding years, Zhou became the top official responsible for China's courts, law enforcement, prosecution agencies, paramilitary forces, and domestic intelligence agencies. Even though he was ranked ninth in the party leadership hierarchy, Zhou, dubbed China's "security tsar" by select English-language media, emerged as one of the Standing Committee's most important members, and was believed as one of China's most powerful men after CCP General Secretary Hu Jintao and Premier Wen Jiabao.

In his position as national Zhengfawei chief, Zhou oversaw extensive security preparations for the 2008 Beijing Olympics, the 60th anniversary celebrations of the founding of the People's Republic of China in 2009, and Expo 2010 in Shanghai. At around this time, weiwen (维稳; roughly, "protecting stability") became a top political priority of the Chinese government. Zhou headed the national weiwen task force, overseeing law enforcement, suppression of dissent, state surveillance, and combating separatist movements in Xinjiang and Tibet. By 2011, during the unfolding of the Arab Spring and the subsequent "Jasmine Revolution" movement, the national weiwen budget, valued at 624.4 billion yuan (US$95 billion), had exceeded the military budget for the first time in history.

On February 20, 2011, Zhou said to assembled officials at a national security conference that law enforcement must "put together a comprehensive system to prevent disturbance and control social order, so that conflict can be resolved at the embryonic stage." In that year, some 130,000 "mass incidents" of protest and violence were reported around the country, mostly caused by official corruption, environmental degradation, and social security issues. Incidents of police brutality increased, and in many cases, police involvement in popular protests exacerbated underlying problems and led to further violence. Towards the end of his term, Zhou presided over a national security & law enforcement system that operated with no meaningful external oversight and operated independently from government organs and the party's collective leadership. As a result of his vast state security "empire" as well as strong remnants of his influence in the national oil sector and Sichuan, Zhou was ranked 29th in the 2011 Forbes list of the world's most powerful people.

Chinese rights activists, such as members of the Weiquan movement, were especially critical of Zhou's tenure as China's security chief. Civil rights lawyer Pu Zhiqiang criticized Zhou in a public lecture at Hong Kong University in December 2011. Two years later, Pu wrote on his microblog that Zhou "brought great disaster and inflicted great suffering on the country and its people." (Note: The original in Chinese was the idiomatic phrase "祸国殃民、荼毒天下") Pu wrote that the weiwen policies spearheaded by Zhou had severely undermined progress in the protection of human rights and rule of law, led to unprecedented levels of popular distrust of government authority, expanded the realm of party control in the lives of ordinary citizens, and ran counter to the spirit of the "Harmonious Society" ideology of the Hu-Wen administration. Former State Council functionary Yu Meisun (俞梅荪) said that Zhou's ten years in power were the "ten darkest years for law and order in history [...] a severe reversal of progress."

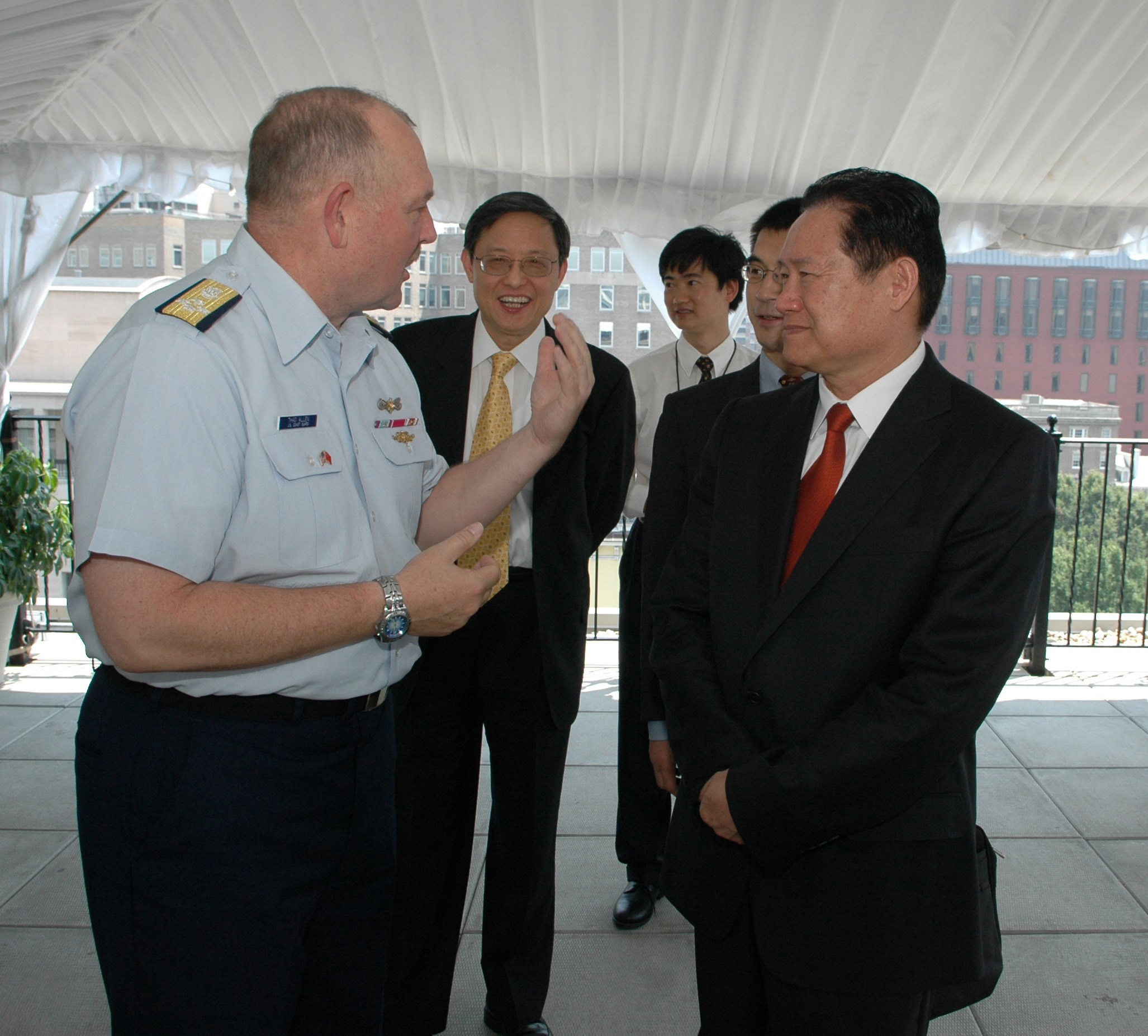
Zhou (right) listens to American Admiral Thad Allen during a 2006 trip to the United States

Several leaked U.S. diplomatic cables from Wikileaks have alleged Zhou's involvement in Beijing's cyber attack against Google, though the claim's veracity has been questioned. Other cables said it was "well-known" that Zhou Yongkang controlled the state monopoly of the oil sector. Zhou also served as China's 'high representative' in matters relating to North Korea, attending the Arirang Festival as a guest of Kim Jong-il before Kim died in 2011.

=== Aftermath of Bo Xilai's ouster ===
In February 2012, former Chongqing police chief Wang Lijun made an abrupt and unexpected visit to the United States consulate in the city of Chengdu. The event set off a political storm, which eventually resulted in the ouster of Chongqing party committee secretary Bo Xilai. Bo, considered a political ally of Zhou, was rumoured to be next-in-line to Zhou's powerful position of Legal and Political Committee (Zhengfawei) Secretary, and thus the Standing Committee. Zhou had a close relationship with Bo, and he was reportedly acquainted with Wang Lijun as far back as his early days as mayor of Panjin. On Zhou's 2010 visit to Chongqing, he publicly endorsed Bo's "Red Songs" and "Strike Black" campaigns (Chinese: 唱红打黑), showing enthusiasm for the so-called "Chongqing model" unmatched by his other Standing Committee colleagues. Zhou lauded Bo's heavy-handed approach to reduce crime in the city, and praised Bo's style of state-driven, populist "mass movements" which had some characteristics of a Maoist-style political campaign. In March, the Standing Committee moved to remove Bo from his positions as a result of Bo being implicated in the Wang Lijun scandal, a decision which Zhou alone was said to have resisted. In 2015, Hong Kong–based media Phoenix Weekly reported that Zhou Yongkang and Bo Xilai had a secret meeting in Chongqing, in which both believed they should end Deng Xiaoping's reform and opening-up policy and reinstate Mao Zedong's policy during the Cultural Revolution.

During the Politburo Standing Committee meeting before Bo's fall, Zhou is the only PSC member who object the removal and arrest of Bo Xilai. However, Zhou's attempt to save Bo Xilai failed as all other PSC members including General Secretary Hu Jintao, Premier Wen Jiabao and Vice President Xi Jinping all support the removal of Bo Xilai. It was reported that Zhou clashed with Premier Wen Jiabao on Bo's removal since Wen is one of the most active opponent of Bo in the Politburo Standing Committee. In the days following Bo Xilai's fall, rumours circulated about Zhou's break with the party leadership as well as a "coup d'etat" on March 19. Unconfirmed reports surfaced on the U.K.-based Sunday Times, citing Hong Kong magazine Frontline (《前哨》), that the paramilitary forces under Zhou's disposal had narrowly avoided direct conflict with the 38th Army in the center of Beijing. (Note: Due to the opaqueness of machinations of China's political elites, numerous conspiracy theories emerged on what really happened in Beijing on the night of March 19 in what became known as the "March 19 Beijing coup". A widely circulated theory from Chinese-language news portal Boxun alleged that Zhou dispatched paramilitary troops in an attempt to free former Dalian Shide executive chairman Xu Ming, and ally of Bo Xilai, from custody, so as to prevent Xu from testifying at Bo's trial. Another more elaborate theory by New York-based Mingjing News stated that Zhou Yongkang planned to launch a coup on the night of March 19, and that Hu Jintao dispatched the 38th Army into Beijing in order to protect the Zhongnanhai compound from incursions by Zhou's "coup militia". This theory posits that paramilitary forces stormed Xinhua Gate and were repelled by the 38th Army in a stand off during which gunshots were fired into the air. Thereafter Hu Jintao received a phone call from former leader Jiang Zemin, who told Hu that Zhou had no intentions of launching a coup, which de-escalated the situation. None of these theories have been independently verified, nor reported on by mainstream English-language news sources.) Outwardly, Zhou appeared to be toeing the party line between March 2012 and his scheduled retirement in November. For example, several days after Bo Xilai was suspended from the Politburo, Zhou held a national conference call with police officials, publicly declaring, "police officers must [...] understand what political position they need to take, maintain the correct political course, and always remain in line with the party centre led by comrade Hu Jintao as its General Secretary."

On May 14, 2012, the Financial Times reported that Zhou had relinquished the operational control of the party's Central Political and Legal Affairs Commission to Minister of Public Security Meng Jianzhu due to his support for Bo Xilai, and had lost his right to select his successor when he retires from the Politburo Standing Committee in the fall of 2012. The New York Times later reported that Zhou's status remained unchanged. At around the same time, a group of provincial party veterans from Yunnan province penned an open letter to Hu Jintao calling for the removal of Zhou Yongkang due to his support of Bo Xilai. The veterans voiced concerns that those supporting Bo intended to reinstate Mao-style policies in China.

In August 2012, party elder's annual meeting in Beidaihe decided that the secretary of Central Political and Legal Affairs Commission will not be a member of the Politburo Standing Committee after the 18th Party Congress.

== Downfall ==
Zhou retired at the 18th Party Congress held in November 2012, an event which saw Xi Jinping, the current General Secretary of the Chinese Communist Party, ascend to become China's paramount leader. In a significant change to China's top ruling council, Zhou's Political and Legal Affairs Commission portfolio did not feature in the new Standing Committee at all; instead, the committee had shrunk to its pre-2002 size of seven instead of nine members. This was followed by wide-ranging reforms to local Zhengfawei organs. For example, the practice of lower-level Zhengfawei chiefs concurrently holding the office of police chief (i.e. Public Security) and concurrent government posts was gradually phased out, and the Zhengfawei was discouraged from directly interfering with ongoing investigations or cases. These reforms signaled a reduction in the executive authority of Zhengfawei chiefs in favour of better checks and balances in the legal system, and a restoration of the Zhengfawei in a policy oversight role rather than being an executive organ, which had been the case under Zhou.

In 2013, Zhou appeared in public three times. He visited his alma maters, Suzhou High School and the China University of Petroleum in April and October, respectively; on June 23, Zhou visited the Zibo, Shandong–based Qilu Petrochemicals Company (Chinese: 齐鲁石化公司), a subsidiary of Sinopec. His visit to Suzhou High School also marked his final pilgrimage to his hometown. During this visit, Zhou suggested that it might be his last visit home. At his visit to the China University of Petroleum campus, Zhou publicly 'pledged his allegiance' to Xi Jinping, China's new leader, rallying students to unite behind Xi to pursue the "Chinese Dream".

=== Consensus among party leaders ===
The new party leadership under Xi reportedly began planning the crackdown on Zhou beginning in 2012. Xi's 'tough talk' on corruption began immediately after his ascension to the post of General Secretary. In his first days in office, Xi vowed to crack down on "tigers and flies", meaning extremely powerful officials as well as petty ones. Xi moved quickly to set a new standard for the expected behavior of party officials, issuing a series of guidelines to clean up the party bureaucracy. Xi may have also been concerned that Zhou might use his influence and power to turn various state security entities into tools for advancing his interests, and in the process, undermine the central authority of the state.

Discussions surrounding the Zhou case took place in the summer of 2013. In June, the Politburo of the Chinese Communist Party held a four-day-long conference in Beijing specifically to discuss Zhou Yongkang. During the meeting, the members of China's ruling council reportedly exchanged differing viewpoints on Zhou. Eventually, Xi Jinping and the other six members of the newly formed 18th Politburo Standing Committee came to a consensus to investigate Zhou.

Zhou's case was unprecedented, as no corruption investigation had ever been initiated against a member of the elite Politburo Standing Committee. The last PSC member to be ousted politically was Zhao Ziyang in the aftermath of the 1989 Tiananmen Square protests and massacre, and the last PSC members to be put on trial were those of the Gang of Four following the Cultural Revolution.

Owing to the far-reaching impact Zhou's case would have on the party as well as the potential for intra-party conflict, Xi also reportedly sought the blessing of former CCP General Secretary Jiang Zemin and Hu Jintao, as well as other 'party elders'. Jiang was said to have met with Xi several times in Beijing between June and July to discuss Zhou Yongkang. During these meetings, Xi was said to have directly elaborated to Jiang on Zhou's alleged crimes, as well as convincing Jiang of the potential harm to the party and the state if Zhou was not brought down. Jiang, though initially reluctant, eventually threw his weight behind Xi. Jiang subsequently applauded Xi's leadership skills during a visit by former U.S. Secretary of State Henry Kissinger. Hu Jintao was reportedly fully supportive of investigating Zhou before the power transition to Xi Jinping at the 18th Party Congress. Zhou himself reportedly sought two audiences with Xi, during which he discussed his contributions to the country and attempted to plead clemency, to no avail.

=== Investigation ===
In August 2013, the Party began a corruption investigation into Zhou. A number of Zhou's former subordinates who were then in high-ranking positions were fired in quick succession. These included Li Chuncheng, a former deputy party secretary in Sichuan; Jiang Jiemin, former chief executive of China Petroleum; Li Dongsheng, former deputy minister of Public Security; Ji Wenlin, Mayor of Haikou and Zhou's former secretary; and Li Chongxi, a high-ranking official in Sichuan province. His former secretaries (i.e., directors of his office, chief of staff) Li Hualin, Shen Dingcheng, and Guo Yongxiang were all detained.

In December, Zhou, his son Zhou Bin and his daughter-in-law Huang Wan were taken into custody. The home of Zhou's younger brother Zhou Yuanxing (周元兴) was searched by the authorities twice. Yuanxing died in December 2013 after a battle with cancer. Zhou Yongkang and his son Zhou Bin were not present at the funeral, fueling speculation that Zhou and his family members were all in custody.

Zhou's family reportedly made billions of dollars by investing in the oil industry, of which Zhou had headed the largest company, China National Petroleum Corp. According to the Hong Kong–based Apple Daily, Zhou's eldest son made more than US$1.6 billion from public works in the city of Chongqing alone. He also supposedly used his father's prominence to extort millions of dollars in protection fees from various businesses and organizations.

Zhou was reportedly being held in confinement without visitation rights in a heavily guarded facility on a military base near Baotou, Inner Mongolia.

By March 2014, Chinese authorities were reported to have seized assets worth at least 90 billion yuan ($14.5 billion) from Zhou's family members and associates.

By spring 2014, it became increasingly clear that Zhou's spheres of influence – the oil sector, Sichuan, the legal system, and his family members – were being methodically rounded up for investigation. However, in the absence of any official reports on Zhou himself, Chinese and international media became rife with speculation about his fate. At a press conference during the March 2014 national meeting of the Chinese People's Political Consultative Conference, a reporter from Hong Kong–based South China Morning Post directly asked the spokesperson if he could provide more information on the rumours circulating about the Zhou Yongkang case. In response, the spokesman chuckled and said, "like you, I've seen some stories on a select few media outlets," he then recited a prepared party-line reply, then ended his response with a smile, "this is really all I can say in response to your question, I think you know what I mean." (你懂的) (Note: The spokesman was referring to the unspoken rule that the authorities cannot confirm or deny any facts related to any party investigation before an official announcement was made. Indeed, in his response, he did not even utter Zhou's name. The phrase ni dongde (你懂的) became so popular after its use by the spokesman that it was regularly used on social media websites as a placeholder for Zhou Yongkang himself, whose name was still routinely censored at the time. To evade censorship, other names used for Zhou included "Master Kang" (康师傅), from the instant noodles brand which shares the Chinese character "Kang", "Big Tiger" (大老虎), "Old Tiger" (老老虎), and "Zhou Tiger" (周老虎).) Afterwards, the assembled press gallery burst into laughter.

=== Arrest and expulsion from the CCP ===
On July 29, 2014, state media formally announced an internal party investigation against Zhou Yongkang's "violations of party discipline", but did not mention any criminal wrongdoing. Several months later, the party investigation concluded that Zhou abused his power for the illicit gain of his family, friends, and associates, took "large amounts in bribes personally and through his family and associates; abused his power to further the interests of his family, mistresses, and associates; committed adultery with multiple women and engaged in the exchange of money and favours for sex; and leaked state and party secrets." State media announced Zhou's arrest to face criminal proceedings on December 5, 2014. He was expelled from the Chinese Communist Party. Zhou was the first Politburo Standing Committee member to be expelled from the party since the fall of the Gang of Four in 1980 (Note: The last Politburo Standing Committee members expelled from the Chinese Communist Party were members of the Gang of Four, Zhang Chunqiao and Wang Hongwen, following their trials in 1980. It is worth noting that Zhao Ziyang, PSC member at the time of the Tiananmen Square protests of 1989 who opposed martial law, and the last PSC member before Zhou to have fallen out of political favour, was never expelled from the party.) after the Cultural Revolution.

After the announcement of Zhou's expulsion from the party, the party's official newspaper People's Daily editorialized that Zhou's expulsion was part of the "strong resolve" to stamp out corruption in the party by General Secretary Xi Jinping. The editorial said the case demonstrated that the party saw "everyone as equal in the eyes of the law." It said that Zhou "betrayed the essence and mission of the party" and that "corruption in the party is like fire and water." Media outlets outside of mainland China speculated about the political reasons behind Zhou's downfall. The Economist compared Zhou's fall with earlier internecine struggles in the party and noted Xi's anti-corruption campaign had "apparent factional bias", quoting a study that no "Princelings" have been investigated in the anti-corruption campaign. He Pin (何频), the chief editor of the overseas Chinese news portal Mingjing, went one step further and asserted plainly that Zhou fell because he was engaged in a political conspiracy to depose Xi Jinping. (Note: According to He, Zhou had formed a "New Gang of Four" with Bo Xilai, disgraced general Xu Caihou, and former General Office chief Ling Jihua, a modern incarnation of the so-called "counter-revolutionary clique" whose real crime was deviating from the party line and "standing on the wrong side". He compared Zhou to losers of historical power struggles in the party, including Gao Gang, Rao Shushi, Liu Shaoqi, Lin Biao, the Gang of Four, Hu Yaobang, and Zhao Ziyang, and asserted that out of these cases only Zhou had truly engaged in forming a political clique to commit a conspiracy against the party's leaders. These assertions have not been independently verified.)

In contrast, The New York Times did not speculate on political reasons behind Zhou's arrest, simply writing that ordinary Chinese people may be alarmed that the legal system was once in the hands of a deeply corrupt politician. Duowei News expressed disappointment with mainstream Western media characterization of the event as "yet another political purge", asserting that seeing modern China, particularly the post-Xi Communist Party, as rife with political intrigue and full of backroom deals is imprecise and naive. Duowei stated that Western media had a very poor grasp of what Xi was trying to achieve, and that Zhou's downfall was but a small element of a larger campaign by Xi Jinping to clean up the party, institutionalize power structures, and re-build the party's legitimacy.

=== Trial and sentencing ===
In the days leading up to the anticipated trial, Supreme Court President Zhou Qiang (of no relation) told an assembled international press conference that Zhou Yongkang's trial would be "open and in accordance with the law." In April 2015, Zhou Yongkang was formally charged with abuse of power, bribery, and intentionally leaking state secrets, and scheduled to face trial at the Tianjin First Intermediate People's Court. Overseas Chinese media were rife with speculation about the 'treatment' Zhou was to receive. However, Zhou's trial unexpectedly took place behind closed doors. On June 11, state media made an announcement – without any apparent warning – that Zhou's verdict had already been reached. The official report on Zhou's trial was brief and stated that he had been convicted on all three charges. The legal sentence, according to the state, was life in prison for bribery, seven years for abuse of power, and four years for "leaking state secrets". The court decided that Zhou could serve prison terms concurrently and amalgamated the sentences into one 'combined' life sentence. The total value of bribes taken by Zhou and his family was said to be 129.7 million yuan (~$18.87 million). State television showed Zhou pleading guilty with a head of fully gray hair, in contrast to his combed jet black hair dye he was known for before his retirement.

Overseas media had compared Zhou's trial to that of Bo Xilai two years earlier, which was noted for being unusually open. In contrast to Bo, Zhou did not appear to dispute his charges. Bo, for the most part, denied his guilt and blamed much of the misdeeds he was accused of on his associates and his family. Zhou, on the other hand, said that "they tried to bribe my family, but really they were after my power. I should assume major responsibility for this". State-run news agency Xinhua said that the trial took place in secret because state secrets were involved in the case. However, it was also likely that Zhou's trial was not open to the public as a result of the sensitivity of the subject matter and its political implications. Observers also cited that the Bo trial became "out of control" as Bo made many shocking revelations during the deliberation of his trial, which became tabloid fodder and led to many rumours circulating on social media, making the authorities more risk-averse to do the same with Zhou.

Zhou's son, Zhou Bin, fled to the US in early 2013 and returned after negotiations with Chinese authorities. In June 2016, Zhou Bin was found guilty of taking 222 million yuan ($34m) in bribes and illegally trading in restricted commodities, and 350 million yuan ($53m) of illicit gains were confiscated; Zhou's wife, Jia Xiaoyue, was fined 1m yuan ($150,000) for bribe-taking. Zhou's son and wife were sentenced to 18 years and 9 years imprisonment respectively.

Since the trial, Zhou has been interned at Qincheng Prison. According to the South China Morning Post in 2019, Zhou's cell is an isolated compound and he has his own garden. It said he has a small plot of land to grow his own produce and that "When his relatives and friends visit him, they sometimes take home fruit and pumpkins grown by Zhou".

== Personal life ==
Zhou Yongkang has two sons, Zhou Bin (周滨) and Zhou Han (周涵), with his first wife, Wang Shuhua (王淑华), whom he met while working in the oilfields of Liaoning province. Wang has been described as a plain, hardworking woman who devoted much of her time to family and raising their two children. The couple had cordial relations while Zhou was at the Liaohe oil field, but the marriage later deteriorated. Zhou was said to be a workaholic on the oil fields, often working into the morning hours and sleeping in his office. Wang died in a motor vehicle collision in 2001, reportedly one of the vehicles involved had military license plates; the cause of the crash was unclear. In 2013, overseas Chinese news websites Mingjing and Boxun both reported that Zhou Yongkang had conspired with his secretary to kill Wang. The credibility of these reports has been questioned.

After Wang died, Zhou married Jia Xiaoye (贾晓烨, also been written as 贾晓晔), a former reporter and television producer at CCTV-2, who is 28 years his junior. According to the autobiography of Shen Bing, (Note: Shen Bing (born 1976), is also a former television host with CCTV. It has been suggested by overseas Chinese media that Shen was a favourite of Zhou, though this has not been confirmed by any authoritative sources. Her autobiography was published in Hong Kong and its authenticity has been questioned.) Zhou and Jia wed at a small, tense private ceremony; no photos were allowed to be taken. Jia continued to maintain a low profile following their wedding; she did not appear at any official functions with Zhou. Indeed, the first official mention of Jia Xiaoye in her capacity as Zhou's wife was during the latter's sentencing announcement in June 2015.

Zhou's son, Zhou Bin, born in 1972, was a prominent oil and gas executive who ostensibly used his father's connections to further his own business interests. The younger Zhou was the primary shareholder and Chairman of Beijing Zhongxu Yangguang Energy Technology Holdings Ltd. (Note: The Chinese name of the company was "北京中旭阳光能源科技股份有限公司". Abbreviated Zhongxu)) Zhou Bin was investigated, tried, and sentenced to 18 years in prison. The younger Zhou is married to Chinese-American Huang Wan (黄婉), whom he met while studying oil and gas exploration in Texas. Huang's mother, Zhan Minli (詹敏利), held a stake in a number of companies with business dealings with China National Petroleum and lives in southern California. Zhou's younger son, Zhou Han, maintains a comparatively lower profile and was not close to his father.

== Notes ==
Party political offices
Preceded by Xie Shijie	Party Secretary of Sichuan; 1999–2002	Succeeded by Zhang Xuezhong
Preceded by Luo Gan	Secretary of the Central Political and Legal Affairs Commission; 2007–2012	Succeeded by Meng Jianzhu
Government offices
Preceded by Position created	Minister of Land and Resources; 1998–1999	Succeeded by Tian Fengshan
Preceded by Jia Chunwang	Minister of Public Security; 2002–2007	Succeeded by Meng Jianzhu
Order of precedence
Preceded by He Guoqiang; Discipline Secretary	9th Rank of the Chinese Communist Party; 17th Politburo Standing Committee	Succeeded by Wang Gang; Member of 17th Politburo, ranked first according to Surname stroke order
