= Li Hualin =

Chinese politician (born 1962)

- 李华林
- Born: October 1962 (age 63); Tianmen, Hubei, China
- Education: Southwest Petroleum University; China University of Petroleum
- Occupations: Deputy General Manager, China National Petroleum Corporation (2013); Deputy General Manager, PetroChina Company Limited (2013); Chairman of the board, Kunlun Energy Company Limited (2013); Vice-president, China National Petroleum Corporation (2007–2009)
- Years active: 1987–2013
- Political party: Chinese Communist Party

Chinese name
- Traditional Chinese: 李華林
- Simplified Chinese: 李华林
Transcriptions
Standard Mandarin
- Hanyu Pinyin: Lǐ Huálín

Li Hualin (Chinese: 李华林; born October 1962) is a Chinese oil and gas executive, and former deputy general manager of China National Petroleum Corporation and PetroChina. Li has over 30 years of experience in the oil and gas industry in China. He spent 25 years in state-owned China National Petroleum Corporation, having worked in the United States, Canada, and Kazakhstan. He also at one point served as Zhou Yongkang's secretary.

In August 2013, Li came under investigation for corruption and was dismissed from his positions.

== Career ==
Li was born in Tianmen, Hubei, with his ancestral home in Nanyang. In July 1983 he graduated from Southwest Petroleum University, majoring in geophysical prospecting. He earned his master of management degree from China University of Petroleum in December 2002.

After graduating from Southwest Petroleum University, he was assigned to the Ministry of Petroleum Industry of the People's Republic of China as an officer, he worked there until March 1987.

Beginning in 1987, he served in several posts in China National Petroleum Corporation, including deputy director, secretary, and general manager. In 1988, while Li was sent to work in the United States, he escorted Zhou Bin (周滨), son of Zhou Yongkang, to study in the United States.

In July 2013, Li was promoted to become the deputy general manager of China National Petroleum Corporation and PetroChina Company Limited, he also served as the board chairman of Kunlun Energy Company Limited (昆仑能源有限公司). When he was the board chairman of Kunlun Energy Company Limited, he used his powers made hundreds of millions of RMB.

== Downfall ==
On August 27, 2013, Li was being investigated by the Central Commission for Discipline Inspection of the Chinese Communist Party for "serious violations of laws and regulations".
