= Jiang Jiemin =

Chinese politician

- 蒋洁敏

Head of the State-owned Assets Supervision and Administration Commission
- In office March 2013 – December 2013
- Preceded by: Wang Yong
- Succeeded by: Zhang Yi

Personal details
- Born: October 1954 (age 71) Taonan, Jilin, China
- Party: Chinese Communist Party (1976–2014, expelled)
- Occupation: Oil and gas executive

Jiang Jiemin (Chinese: 蒋洁敏; pinyin: Jiǎng Jiémǐn, [tɕjàŋ tɕjěmìn]; born October 1954) is a former Chinese oil executive and senior Communist Party and economic official. He was the general manager and then chairman of the China National Petroleum Corporation (CNPC), before being appointed the director of the State-owned Assets Supervision and Administration Commission (SASAC) in March 2013. He was also a member of the 18th Central Committee of the Chinese Communist Party.

In September 2013, Jiang was abruptly removed from his post and came under investigation for corruption and abuse of power, along with four other senior oil executives. Jiang was considered an ally of former security chief Zhou Yongkang, and part of a group of officials that had political ties with Zhou.

In June 2014, Jiang was expelled from the Chinese Communist Party; he was convicted on charges of abuse of power and bribery and sentenced to 16 years in prison.

== Career ==
Jiang Jiemin graduated from Shandong University in Industrial Economics Management. In August 1976, Jiang joined the Chinese Communist Party.

Jiang was made deputy director of the Shengli Petroleum Administration Bureau in March 1993, Senior Executive of the Qinghai Petroleum Administration Bureau in June 1994, and Director of the Qinghai Petroleum Administration Bureau in November 1994. In February 1999 he was made Assistant to the General Manager and the team leader in charge of the preparation for the initial public offering of China National Petroleum Corporation (CNPC). In November of that year he was promoted again, to Director and Vice President of PetroChina, a subsidiary of CNPC.

From there his career went to Qinghai Province, as deputy governor and member of the provincial Party Standing Committee in June 2000. In June 2001, he became Deputy Party Secretary of Qinghai province. In April 2004, he was transferred back to CNPC, as Deputy General Manager and Vice Chairman; in May he was made President of PetroChina, and in November 2006 General Manager of CNPC. In May 2007 he became the Chairman of PetroChina. In May 2008, he stepped down from the position.

Jiang was reported to have faced unusual public criticism from small investors after PetroChina's share price fell sharply due partly to the government's control of retail fuel prices. The Times noted that he was a key figure in "China's determined expansion of its energy empire overseas."

In November 2012, the South China Morning Post reported that in the aftermath of the Ferrari death of Ling Gu, the 23-year-old son of Ling Jihua, top aide to former Party General Secretary Hu Jintao, Jiang wired hush money from the company's accounts to the families of the two women who were accompanying Ling Gu at the time of his death.

Jiang was an alternate of the 17th Central Committee of the Chinese Communist Party, and a full member of the 18th Central Committee. He was expelled from the Central Committee at the Third Plenum in 2014.

== Corruption investigation ==
On September 1, 2013, Jiang was detained by the Central Commission for Discipline Inspection, the party's anti-graft agency, on suspicion of corruption, and was removed from his post as Chairman of SASAC. It was widely speculated that Jiang's case was part of a bigger corruption probe whose ultimate target was former Politburo Standing Committee member Zhou Yongkang. Jiang (after former Sichuan deputy Party chief Li Chuncheng) was the second high-ranking official associated with Zhou detained following the 18th Party Congress.

On June 30, 2014, Jiang was expelled from the Chinese Communist Party. Authorities announced at the conclusion of the investigation that Jiang "abused his power for the illicit gain of others," and "solicited and received massive bribes."

On March 19, 2015, Jiang was indicted on charges of bribery, large amounts of property from unknown source and abuse of power. According to Zhou Ruijin, a former editor in chief of Communist Party's flagship newspaper People's Daily, Jiang Jiemin was part of a "network of vice and corruption" along with Zhou Yongkang, Bo Xilai, Xu Caihou, Ling Jihua, and Li Dongsheng."

On October 12, 2015, the court found Jiang guilty on all counts, including accepting bribes, unidentified huge property, abuses of power, and sentenced him to 16 years in prison.
