= Secretary of the Central Political and Legal Affairs Commission =

Chinese Communist Party position

Secretary of the Political and Legal Affairs Commission of the Central Committee of the Chinese Communist Party
- 中国共产党中央政法委员会书记
- Emblem of the Chinese Communist Party

- Flag of the Chinese Communist Party

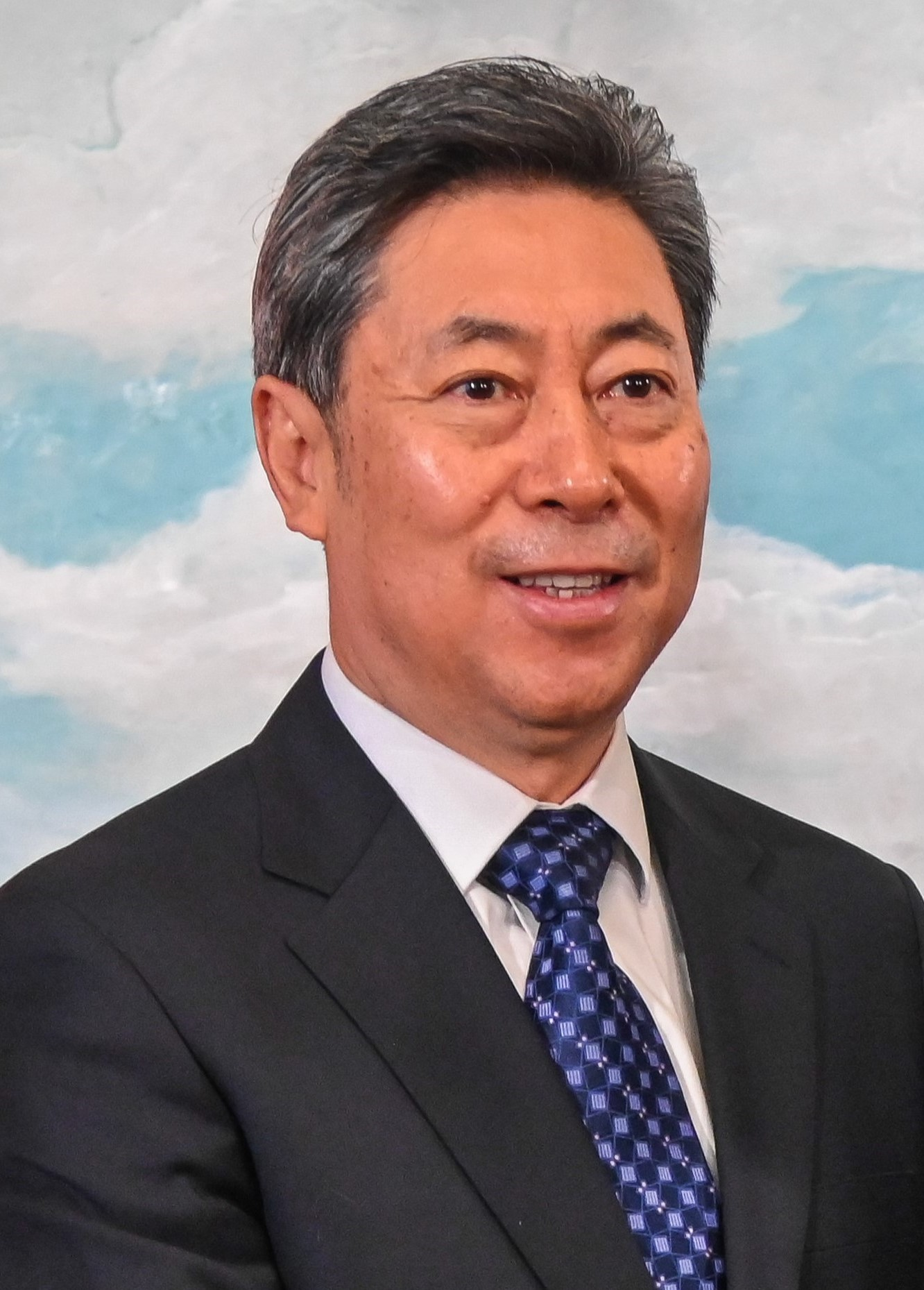
- Incumbent; Chen Wenqing since October 28, 2022
- Central Political and Legal Affairs Commission
- Type: Department Head
- Status: Provincial and ministerial-level official
- Seat: Beijing
- Nominator: Central Committee
- Appointer: Central Committee
- Inaugural holder: Peng Zhen
- Formation: 1958
- Deputy: Deputy Secretary

The secretary of the Political and Legal Affairs Commission of the Central Committee of the Chinese Communist Party is the leader of the Central Political and Legal Affairs Commission (CPLC), the department of the Central Committee of the Chinese Communist Party (CCP) responsible for political and legal affairs.

The Central Political and Legal Affairs Commission is headed by a single secretary, operating under a "secretary responsibility system." The secretary is assisted by deputy secretaries and members. The secretary of the Central Political and Legal Affairs Commission is a key leadership position within the CCP Central Committee, typically held by a member of the Secretariat, a member of the Politburo, or sometimes a member of the Politburo Standing Committee, a position that places them among the Party and state leaders. The current head of the CPLC is Chen Wenqing, who is a member of the CCP Politburo.

== History ==
In 1958, a Politics and Law Leading Group was set up, with Peng Zhen as its leader. In 1980, the commission was established, with Peng Zhen back as its secretary.

In 2013 and 2014, the Politburo of the CCP Central Committee held meetings to hear the findings of an investigation against Zhou Yongkang and, in June 2015, Zhou was found guilty of accepting bribes, abuse of power, intentionally leaking state secrets for which his private possessions were confiscated and he was sentenced to life in prison. Zhou is among the most senior and powerful Chinese leaders to be jailed in CCP general secretary Xi Jinping's anti-corruption campaign.

== List of secretaries ==
=== Leaders of the Central Political and Law Group ===
Name	Start	End	Ref.
Peng Zhen 彭真 (1902–1997)	June 1958	1958	
Luo Ruiqing 罗瑞卿 (1906–1978)	1958	December 1960	
Xie Fuzhi 谢富治 (1909–1972)	December 1960	1966	
Ji Dengkui 纪登奎 (1923–1988)	1969	January 1980	

=== Secretaries of the Central Politics and Legal Affairs Commission ===
No.	Officeholder	Term of office		Ref.
No.	Officeholder	Start	End	Ref.
1	Peng Zhen 彭真 (1902–1997)	January 1980	May 1982	
2	Chen Pixian 陈丕显 (1916–1995)	May 1982	July 1985	
3	Qiao Shi 乔石 (1924–2015)	July 1985	November 1992	
4	Ren Jianxin 任建新 (1925–2024)	November 1992	March 1998	
5	Luo Gan 罗干 (born 1935)	27 March 1998	22 October 2007	
6	Zhou Yongkang 周永康 (born 1942)	22 October 2007	20 November 2012	
7	Meng Jianzhu 孟建柱 (born 1947)	20 November 2012	31 October 2017	
8	Guo Shengkun 郭声琨 (born 1954)	31 October 2017	28 October 2022	
9	Chen Wenqing 陈文清 (born 1960)	28 October 2022	Incumbent	
