= Liangcheng County =

Liangcheng County 凉城县 • ᠯᠢᠶᠠᠩᠴᠠᠩ ᠰᠢᠶᠠᠨ
- County
- Location in Inner Mongolia Liangcheng (China)
- Coordinates: 40°32′N 112°30′E
- Country: China
- Autonomous region: Inner Mongolia
- Prefecture-level city: Ulaan Chab
- County seat: Tagin Nur

Area
  - Total: 3,437 km^{2} (1,327 sq mi)
- Elevation: 1,257 m (4,124 ft)

Population (2020)
  - Total: 119,061
  - Density: 34.64/km^{2} (89.72/sq mi)
- Time zone: UTC+8 (China Standard)
- Website: www.liangcheng.gov.cn

Liangcheng County

Chinese name
- Simplified Chinese: 凉城县
- Traditional Chinese: 涼城縣
Transcriptions
Standard Mandarin
- Hanyu Pinyin: Liángchéng Xiàn

Mongolian name
- Mongolian Cyrillic: Лианцан шиан
- Mongolian script: ᠯᠢᠶᠠᠩᠴᠠᠩ ᠰᠢᠶᠠᠨ
Transcriptions
- SASM/GNC: Liyaŋčaŋ siyan

Liangcheng County (Mongolian: ᠯᠢᠶᠠᠩᠴᠠᠩ ᠰᠢᠶᠠᠨ; Chinese: 凉城县) is a county of south-central Inner Mongolia, China, bounded by Shanxi province to the south. It is under the administration of Ulaan Chab city, and borders Fengzhen City to the east, Zhuozi County to the north, and the regional capital of Hohhot to the west.

== Administrative divisions ==
Liangcheng County is made up of 6 towns, 1 township, and 1 ethnic township.

Name	Simplified Chinese	Hanyu Pinyin	Mongolian (Hudum Script)	Mongolian (Cyrillic)	Administrative division code
Towns
Hongmao Town	鸿茅镇	Hóngmáo Zhèn	ᠬᠤᠩ ᠮᠣᠤ ᠪᠠᠯᠭᠠᠰᠤ	Хон муу балгас	150925103
Jurgadugar Sum Town	六苏木镇	Liùsūmù Zhèn	ᠵᠢᠷᠭᠤᠳᠤᠭᠠᠷ ᠰᠤᠮᠤ ᠪᠠᠯᠭᠠᠰᠤ	Зургадугаар сум балгас	150925104
Maihand Town	麦胡图镇	Màihútú Zhèn	ᠮᠠᠢᠬᠠᠨᠳᠤ ᠪᠠᠯᠭᠠᠰᠤ	Майхант балгас	150925105
Yongxing Town	永兴镇	Yǒngxīng Zhèn	ᠶᠦᠩ ᠰᠢᠩ ᠪᠠᠯᠭᠠᠰᠤ	Юн шин балгас	150925106
Manhan Town	蛮汉镇	Mánhàn Zhèn	ᠮᠠᠨ ᠬᠠᠨ ᠪᠠᠯᠭᠠᠰᠤ	Ман хан балгас	150925107
Tagin Nur Town	岱海镇	Dàihǎi Zhèn	ᠲᠠᠭ᠎ᠠ ᠶᠢᠨ ᠨᠠᠭᠤᠷ ᠪᠠᠯᠭᠠᠰᠤ	Даагын нуур балгас	150925108
Township
Tiancheng Township	天成乡	Tiānchéng Xiāng	ᠲᠢᠶᠠᠨ ᠴᠧᠩ ᠰᠢᠶᠠᠩ	Даяан цэн шиян	150925218
Ethnic township
Caonian Manchu Ethnic Township	曹碾满族乡	Cáoniǎn Mǎnzú Xiāng	ᠼᠣᠤ ᠨᠢᠶᠠᠨ ᠮᠠᠨᠵᠤ ᠦᠨᠳᠦᠰᠦᠲᠡᠨ ᠦ ᠰᠢᠶᠠᠩ	Цуу нян манж үндэстэний шиян	150925220

== Climate ==
Climate data for Liangcheng, elevation 1,269 m (4,163 ft), (1991–2020 normals, extremes 1981–2010)
Month	Jan	Feb	Mar	Apr	May	Jun	Jul	Aug	Sep	Oct	Nov	Dec	Year
Record high °C (°F)	8.1 (46.6)	16.0 (60.8)	23.8 (74.8)	32.0 (89.6)	33.4 (92.1)	39.3 (102.7)	38.6 (101.5)	34.1 (93.4)	33.6 (92.5)	26.0 (78.8)	18.9 (66.0)	11.6 (52.9)	39.3 (102.7)
Mean daily maximum °C (°F)	−4.9 (23.2)	0.2 (32.4)	7.4 (45.3)	15.9 (60.6)	22.1 (71.8)	26.4 (79.5)	27.8 (82.0)	26.1 (79.0)	21.2 (70.2)	13.9 (57.0)	4.7 (40.5)	−3.1 (26.4)	13.1 (55.7)
Daily mean °C (°F)	−12.2 (10.0)	−7.4 (18.7)	0.2 (32.4)	8.4 (47.1)	15.1 (59.2)	19.6 (67.3)	21.4 (70.5)	19.6 (67.3)	14.0 (57.2)	6.7 (44.1)	−2.0 (28.4)	−9.6 (14.7)	6.1 (43.1)
Mean daily minimum °C (°F)	−18.4 (−1.1)	−13.9 (7.0)	−6.4 (20.5)	0.9 (33.6)	7.3 (45.1)	12.4 (54.3)	15.1 (59.2)	13.3 (55.9)	7.5 (45.5)	0.6 (33.1)	−7.3 (18.9)	−15.0 (5.0)	−0.3 (31.4)
Record low °C (°F)	−34.5 (−30.1)	−32.2 (−26.0)	−23.2 (−9.8)	−10.3 (13.5)	−5.3 (22.5)	0.6 (33.1)	7.3 (45.1)	3.7 (38.7)	−2.4 (27.7)	−9.7 (14.5)	−25.4 (−13.7)	−34.0 (−29.2)	−34.5 (−30.1)
Average precipitation mm (inches)	1.9 (0.07)	4.2 (0.17)	9.0 (0.35)	18.8 (0.74)	32.7 (1.29)	52.1 (2.05)	117.4 (4.62)	84.1 (3.31)	54.1 (2.13)	22.4 (0.88)	8.3 (0.33)	2.7 (0.11)	407.7 (16.05)
Average precipitation days (≥ 0.1 mm)	2	2.8	4.3	4.3	6.9	10.3	13.5	11.4	9.3	5.8	3.3	2.3	76.2
Average snowy days	3.7	4.5	4.8	2.3	0.2	0	0	0	0	0.9	3.9	4.4	24.7
Average relative humidity (%)	57	50	43	37	39	50	64	67	63	57	55	55	53
Mean monthly sunshine hours	206.2	212.4	252.3	273.9	291.3	273.2	263.1	259.9	236.7	236.3	201.2	198.8	2,905.3
Percentage possible sunshine	69	70	68	68	65	61	58	62	64	70	68	69	66
Source: China Meteorological Administration
