= Liaohe oil field =

Oil field in Liaoning Province, China

Liaohe
- Country: China
- Region: Liaoning
- Location: Panjin
- Offshore/onshore: onshore
- Operator: China National Petroleum Corporation

Field history
- Discovery: 1958
- Start of production: 1970

Production
- Estimated oil in place: 968 million tonnes (~ 1.093×10^{9} m^{3} or 6873 million bbl)

The Liaohe oil field is an oil field located in Liaoning Province (Bohai Basin), China. It was discovered in 1958 and developed by China National Petroleum Corporation. It began production in 1970 and produces oil. The total proven reserves of the Liaohe oil field are around 6.87 billion barrels (968 million tonnes), and production is centered on 312,000 barrels per day (49,600 m^{3}/d). Production peaked in 1995.

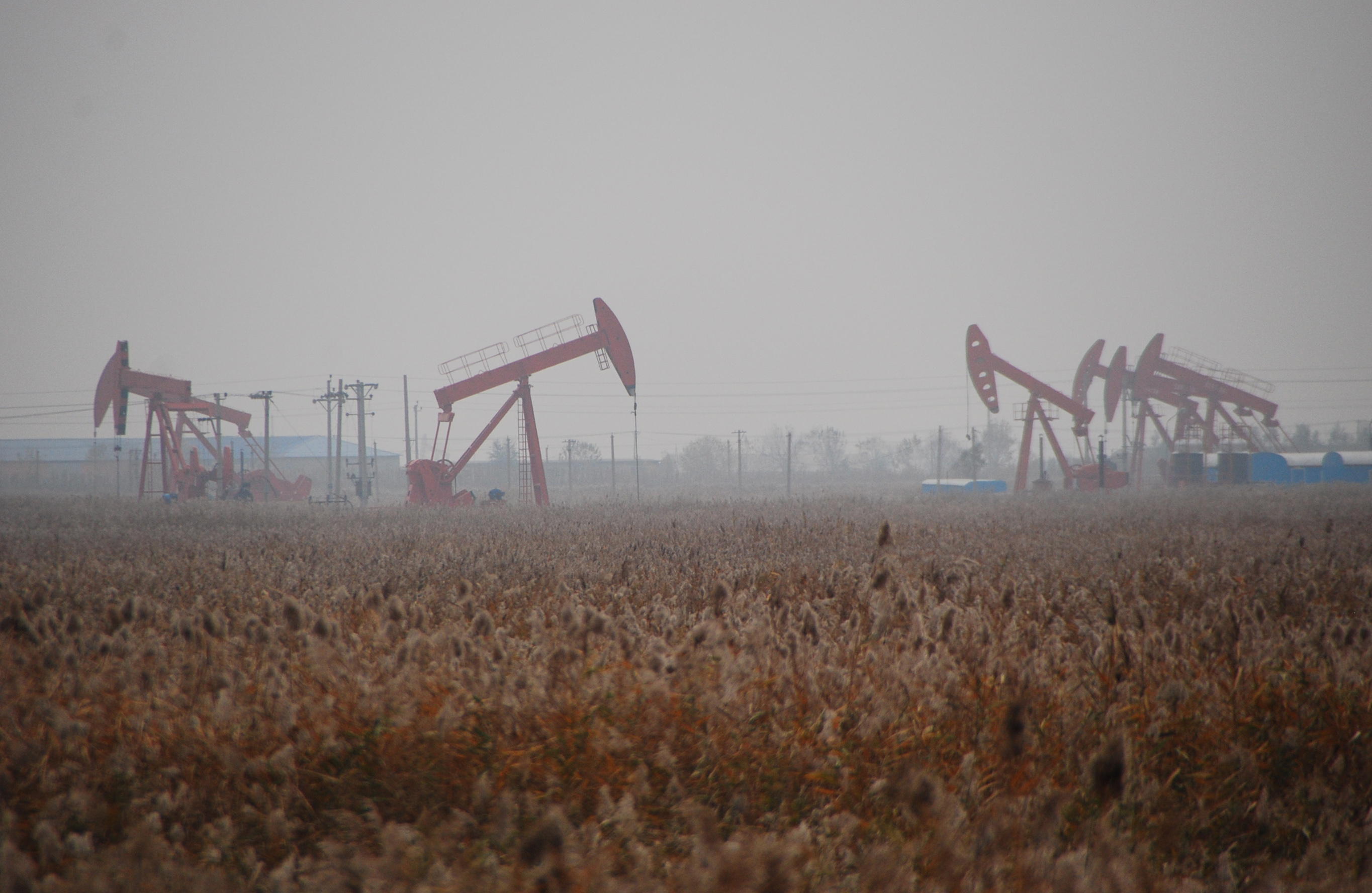
Liaohe oil field in Panjin, Liaoning, China
