= Guo Yongxiang =

Chinese politician

- 郭永祥

President of Sichuan Federation of Literary and Art Circles
- In office February 2009 – April 2014

Vice-Chairman of the Sichuan People's Congress
- In office January 2008 – February 2013
- Leader: Liu Qibao (chairman)

Vice-Governor of Sichuan
- In office January 2006 – January 2008
- Governor: Zhang Zhongwei; Jiang Jufeng

Personal details
- Born: February 1949 (age 77) Linyi County, Shandong, China
- Party: Chinese Communist Party (1971–2014, expelled)
- Education: Central Party School of the Chinese Communist Party

Guo Yongxiang (Chinese: 郭永祥; pinyin: Guō Yǒngxiáng; born February 1949) is a former Chinese politician. He worked for the China National Petroleum Corporation before joining the Ministry of Land and Resources. He was subsequently transferred to work in Sichuan province, and successively served as the Vice Governor and Vice Chairman of the provincial People's Congress. He was investigated for corruption, dismissed from office, expelled from the Chinese Communist Party (CCP), and sentenced to 20 years in prison. Guo was a close associate of disgraced former security tsar Zhou Yongkang.

== Biography ==
Guo was born in Linyi County, Shandong in February 1949, during the Republic of China.

Guo joined the Chinese Communist Party in January 1971 and he got involved in politics in December 1972.

During the Cultural Revolution, Guo worked in Shengli Oil Field, Shandong as an officer, he entered the China National Petroleum Corp in August 1990.

He attended Central Party School of the Chinese Communist Party in August 1992, majoring in economic administration, where he graduated in December 1994. In July 1998, Guo was appointed as Chief of Office Ministry of Land and Resources.

In January 2000 he was promoted to become the deputy secretary general of Sichuan Committee of Chinese Communist Party, a position he held until December 2002.

In December 2002, he was appointed a Standing Committee member of Sichuan Committee of Chinese Communist Party, the secretary general of Sichuan Committee of Chinese Communist Party and the chairman of CCP Sichuan Provincial Committee Office, he remained in that positions until January 2006, when he was appointed the vice-governor of Sichuan.

In January 2008, Guo was elected as the vice-chairman of the Sichuan People's Congress.

In February 2009, Guo was appointed as the president of Sichuan Federation of Literary and Art Circles.

== Downfall ==
On June 23, 2013, Guo was being investigated by the Central Commission for Discipline Inspection for "serious violations of laws and regulations".

On April 8, 2014, Guo was dismissed from his government positions and expelled from the CCP.

On October 13, 2015, Guo was sentenced 20 years in the jail.

== See also ==
- List of members of the 11th National People's Congress
