= Ji Wenlin =

Chinese politician

- 冀文林

Vice-Governor of Hainan
- In office January 2013 – February 2014
- Governor: Jiang Dingzhi

Mayor of Haikou
- In office February 2011 – 2014
- Preceded by: Xu Tangxian
- Succeeded by: Ni Qiang

Personal details
- Born: July 1966 (age 60) Liangcheng County, Inner Mongolia, China
- Party: Chinese Communist Party (1994–2014, expelled)
- Education: China University of Geosciences

Ji Wenlin (Chinese: 冀文林; pinyin: Jì Wénlín; born July 1966) is a former Chinese politician. He was investigated by the Chinese Communist Party's anti-graft agency in February 2014. Previously he served as the mayor of Haikou and the vice-Governor of Hainan. He once worked as the secretary of Zhou Yongkang.

== Biography ==
Ji was born in Liangcheng County, Inner Mongolia in July 1966. He graduated from China University of Geosciences, majoring in Geophysics.

He got involved in politics in July 1989 and joined the Chinese Communist Party in August 1994. In 1998 he joined the newly created Ministry of Land and Resources, working as the secretary of Minister Zhou Yongkang.

In 2008, he became a director of the Office Ministry of Land and Resources, a position he held until January 2009.

In February 2011, he was appointed the Mayor of Haikou, capital of Hainan province, then promoted to Vice-Governor of Hainan in January 2013.

=== Downfall ===
On February 18, 2014, he was being investigated by the Central Commission for Discipline Inspection for "serious violations of laws and regulations". Ji was sentenced 12 years in prison for corruption on March 30, 2016.

Government offices
Preceded by Xu Tangxian	Mayor of Haikou; 2011–2014	Succeeded by Ni Qiang
