= Southwest Petroleum University =

Provincial public university in Chengdu, Sichuan, China

- 西南石油大学
- Former names: Sichuan Petroleum College; Southwest Petroleum College
- Motto: 明德，笃志，博学，创新
- Motto in English: Righteous deed, persistent quest, extensive learning and creative mind
- Type: Public university
- Established: 1958; 68 years ago
- Parent institution: Sichuan Provincial People's Government
- Academic affiliations: Double First Class University
- President: Guo Jianchun
- Vice-president: Zhang Wenwei; Zhang Liehui; Guo Jianchun
- Chair of the University Council: Zhao Zhengwen
- Faculty: 298
- Administrative staff: 1,340
- Students: 32,498
- Undergraduates: 26,490
- Postgraduates: 3,801
- Doctoral students: 715
- Location: Chengdu and Nanchong, Sichuan, China
- Campus: Suburban, 200 ha (490 acres)
- Website: www.swpu.edu.cn

Chinese name
- Simplified Chinese: 西南石油大学
- Traditional Chinese: 西南石油大學
Transcriptions
Standard Mandarin
- Hanyu Pinyin: Xīnán Shíyóu Dàxué

Southwest Petroleum University (SWPU; 西南石油大学) is a provincial public university in Chengdu, Sichuan, China. It is affiliated with the Province of Sichuan, and co-sponsored by the Ministry of Education of China, Sichuan Provincial Government, China National Petroleum Corporation, China Petroleum & Chemical Corporation, and China National Offshore Oil Corporation. The university is part of the Double First-Class Construction.

The university was founded in 1958.

== Introduction ==
Southwest Petroleum University (SWPU), located in Chengdu City and Nanchong City, was founded in 1958. SWPU was originally named Sichuan Petroleum Institute and in 1970, was renamed to Southwest Petroleum Institute. It became Southwest Petroleum University (SWPU) after achieving university status in 2005. Originally, SWPU was supported and administered by the Ministry of Petroleum Industry and the China National Petroleum Corporation (CNPC). Since 2000, the university has been co-administered by both Sichuan Province and CNPC.

SWPU has two campuses: the original campus at Nanchong City and the main campus at Chengdu City with a total area of about 200 hectares (490 acres). The total floor space is more than 900,000 square meters.

The university is divided into 18 schools and departments that, together, offer 60 bachelor's degree programs. SWPU is one of the first universities in China that was authorized to confer bachelor, masters and doctoral degrees. It has one provincial-level graduate school offering three post-doctoral research programs. SWPU has 23 doctor's degree programs, 85 master's degree programs, and one key discipline program in oil and gas engineering. At the provincial and ministerial level, it has seven laboratories and 25 research and technical centers, including a center for well-completion techniques built with the assistance of the United Nations. In addition, it has the Sino-Canadian Training Center for Natural Gas Exploration and Exploitation, built with the support of the Canadian government. At the national level, it has one key laboratory of Oil and Gas Reservoir Geology and Exploitation in which three key disciplines are pursued. Under the auspices of the Ministry of Education, SWPU owns an oil and gas equipment key laboratory, the Natural Gas Exploitation Engineering Research Center, and the Oil Field Petrochemical Engineering Research Center. At the university, two extensive libraries are available offering a collection of over two million volumes.

Students from across the nation attend SWPU. Each year, more than 5,000 first-year undergraduates enroll in addition to over 1,000 first-year master's and doctoral degree candidates. The present enrollment of full-time students is more than 32,498, including 8 international students, 26,490 undergraduates, 3,801 postgraduates and 715 PhD students. More than 100,000 students have graduated from SWPU since its establishment. Within the past ten years, the proportion of students successfully being employed is more than 94 percent every year.

As of September 2025, the university has a total of 2,769 faculty and staff members, including 394 individuals holding senior professional titles and 709 holding associate senior professional titles.

SWPU has been involved in over 6,121 scientific programs since 2001 and has obtained 783 million RMB (renminbi) in scientific funding, winning 95 provincial or ministerial prizes. 495 patents have been approved, 184 of which are invented patents.

SWPU has established worldwide cooperative relationships with universities and research institutions, including those in the United States, United Kingdom, Japan, France, Germany, Canada, Russia and India. One example being a 2+2 degree program with the University of Leeds, UK.

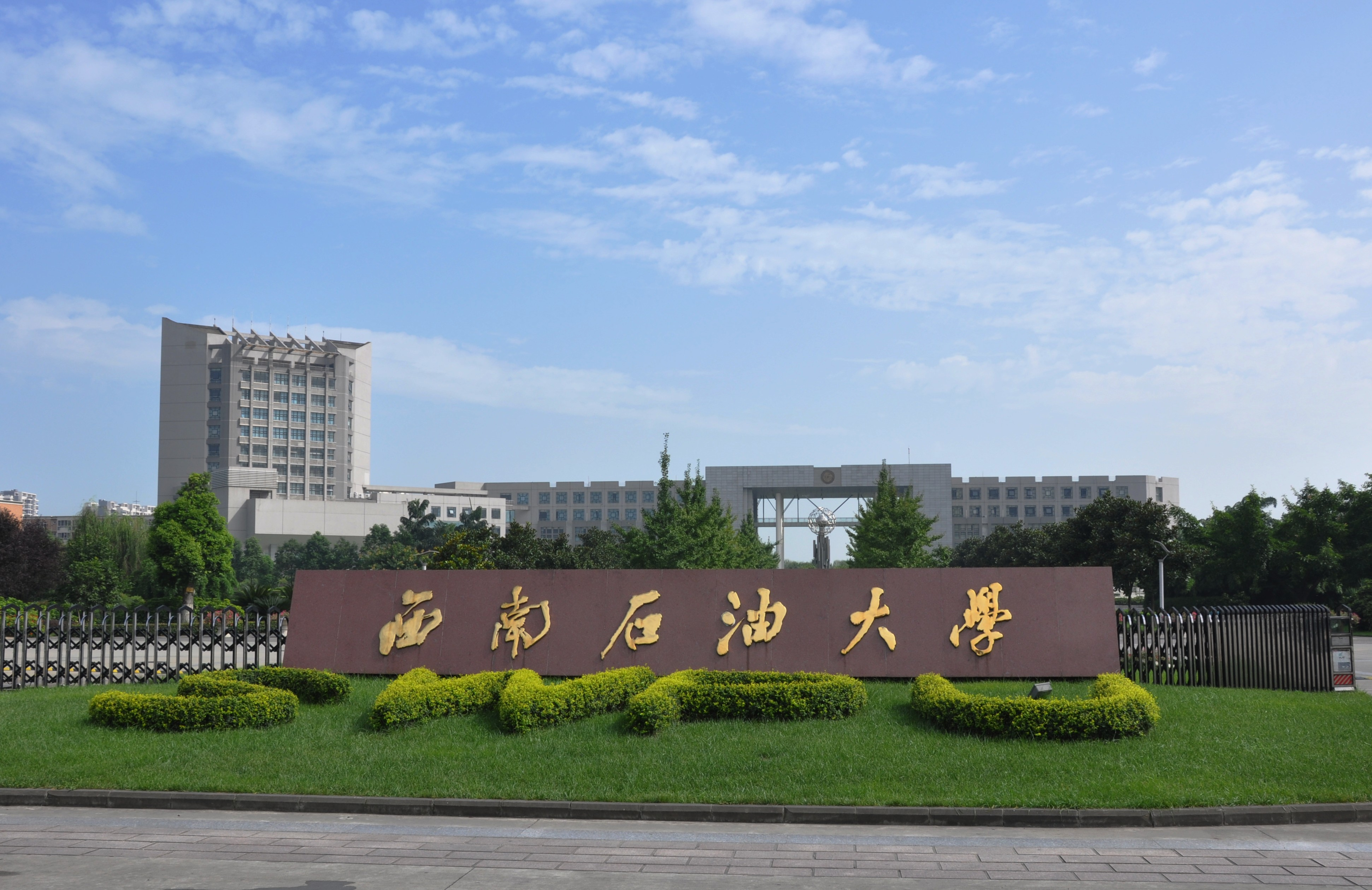

== Administration ==
The schools and departments are organized into the following divisions:

=== Schools and departments ===
- School of Oil and Natural Gas Engineering
- School of Geosciences and Technology
- School of Mechanical Engineering
- School of Chemistry and Chemical Engineering
- School of New Energy and Materials
- School of Computer Science
- School of Electronics and Information Engineering
- School of Civil Engineering and Architecture
- School of Sciences
- School of Economics and Management / MBA
- Educational Center
- School of Law
- School of Marxism
- School of Foreign Languages
- School of Physical Education
- School of Art
- School of Vocational and Technical Education

=== National Level Key Disciplines ===
Southwest Petroleum University has a number of National Key Disciplines.

1. Oil and Gas Exploitation Engineering
2. Oil and Gas Drilling Engineering
3. Oil and Gas Storage and Transportation Engineering

=== Provincial or Ministerial Level Key Disciplines ===
1. Applied Chemistry (Both Provincial and Ministerial Level)
2. Mineral Survey and Exploration (Provincial Level)
3. Mechanical Design and Theory (Both Provincial and Ministerial Level)
4. Mechanical Manufacture and Automation (Provincial Level)
5. Geodetection and Information Technology (Provincial Level)

=== History ===
1958-1962 Sichuan Petroleum Institute run by the local government of Sichuan Province

1962-1970 Sichuan Petroleum Institute run by the Ministry of Petroleum Industry, P.R.China

1970-1978 Southwest Petroleum Institute run by the local government of Sichuan Province

1978-1988 Southwest Petroleum Institute run by the Ministry of Petroleum Industry, P.R. China

1988-1998 Southwest Petroleum Institute run by China National Petroleum Corporation, P.R.China

1998-2000 Southwest Petroleum Institute run by China National Petroleum Corporation (Group), P.R.China

2000-2005 Southwest Petroleum Institute run by the local government of Sichuan Province

2005- Southwest Petroleum University run by the local government of Sichuan Province.
