= Anti-corruption campaign under Xi Jinping =

Campaign in China since 2012

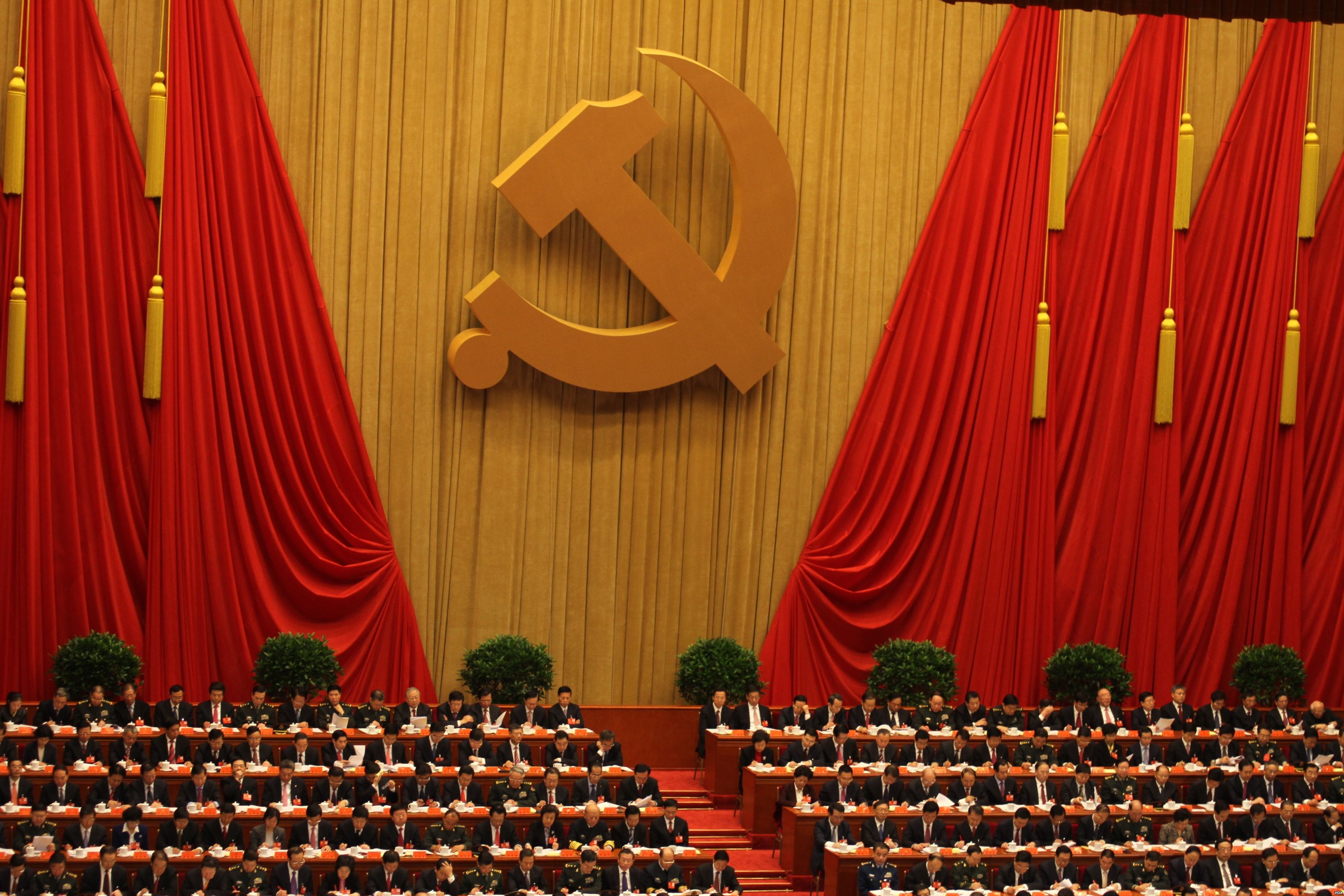
The anti-corruption campaign began after the conclusion of the 18th National Congress of the Chinese Communist Party held in Beijing in November 2012.

A far-reaching anti-corruption campaign was launched in China following the conclusion of the 18th National Congress of the Chinese Communist Party (CCP) in 2012. Initiated by CCP general secretary Xi Jinping, the campaign became the most extensive and systematic anti-corruption effort in the history of CCP governance. The campaign began with the Central Commission for Discipline Inspection (CCDI) conducting investigations and purging numerous high-ranking CCP and government officials, as well as People's Liberation Army (PLA) generals and heads of state-owned enterprises and institutions, for violations of discipline and law. Nationwide, disciplinary inspection and supervision departments at all levels of the CCP and government have investigated and punished CCP members and senior officials for violations of discipline and law.

Upon assuming office, Xi pledged to crack down on both "tigers and flies", referring respectively to high-ranking officials and grassroots civil servants. Most of the officials investigated were dismissed from office and faced charges of bribery and abuse of power, though the severity and nature of the alleged misconduct varied considerably. Administered primarily by the CCDI its Secretary from 2012 to 2017, Wang Qishan, alongside the relevant military and judicial bodies, the campaign has targeted hundreds of senior officials, including dozens of ministerial-level official and senior PLA officers, hundreds of deputy ministerial-level officials, several executives of state-owned enterprises, and five national leaders. The campaign has also led to strengthening of the CCDI apparatus within the CCP, as well as enhanced power over local Discipline Inspection Commissions. In 2018, the National Supervisory Commission was formed as the country's highest state supervisory body following a merger between various anti-corruption government departments, strengthening the CCDI's powers and reach.

The campaign notably investigated both sitting and former national-level leaders. These included former Politburo Standing Committee (PSC) member Zhou Yongkang and former Politburo members and Central Military Commission (CMC) vice chairmen Xu Caihou and Guo Boxiong. The campaign also targeted sitting Politburo members such as Chongqing CCP committee secretary Sun Zhengcai in 2017, CMC vice chairmen He Weidong and Zhang Youxia in 2025 and 2026 respectively. and former Xinjiang CCP committee secretary Ma Xingrui in 2026. As of 2023, approximately 2.3 million government officials had been prosecuted. The campaign formed a central component of a broader initiative aimed at curbing corruption within the CCP and reinforcing internal unity through a process termed self-revolution. It has since become one of the defining features of Xi's political legacy and has been cited as a key factor that allowed Xi to consolidate power.

== Campaign oversight ==
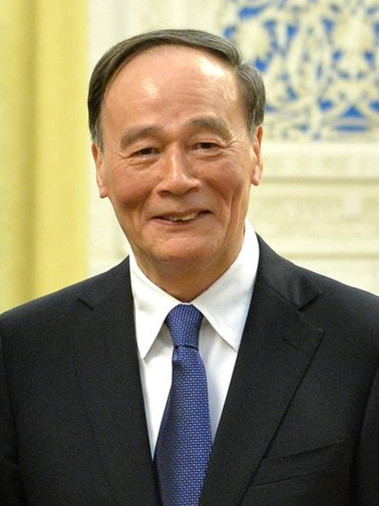
Wang Qishan (2012–2017)

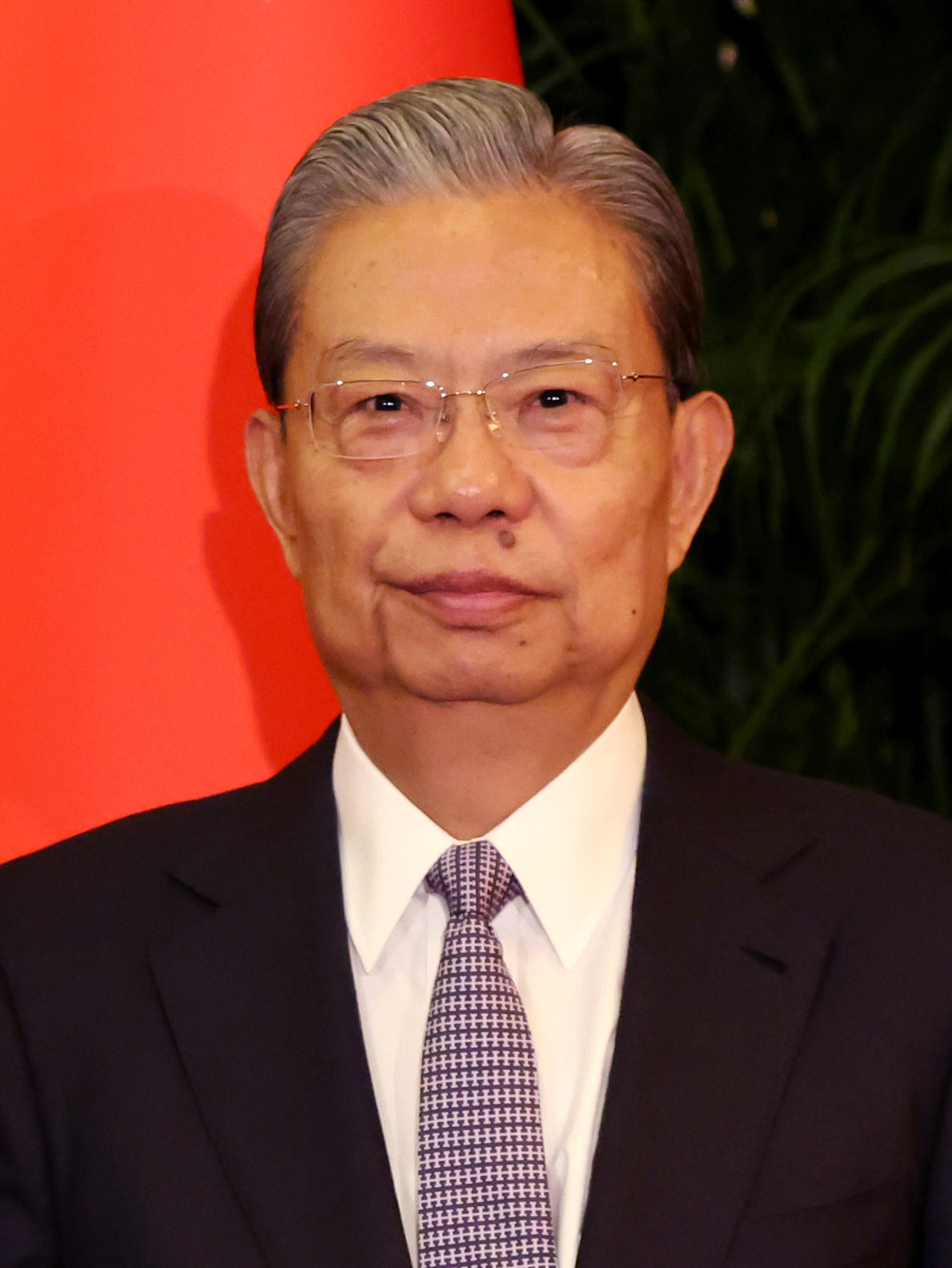
Zhao Leji (2017–2022)

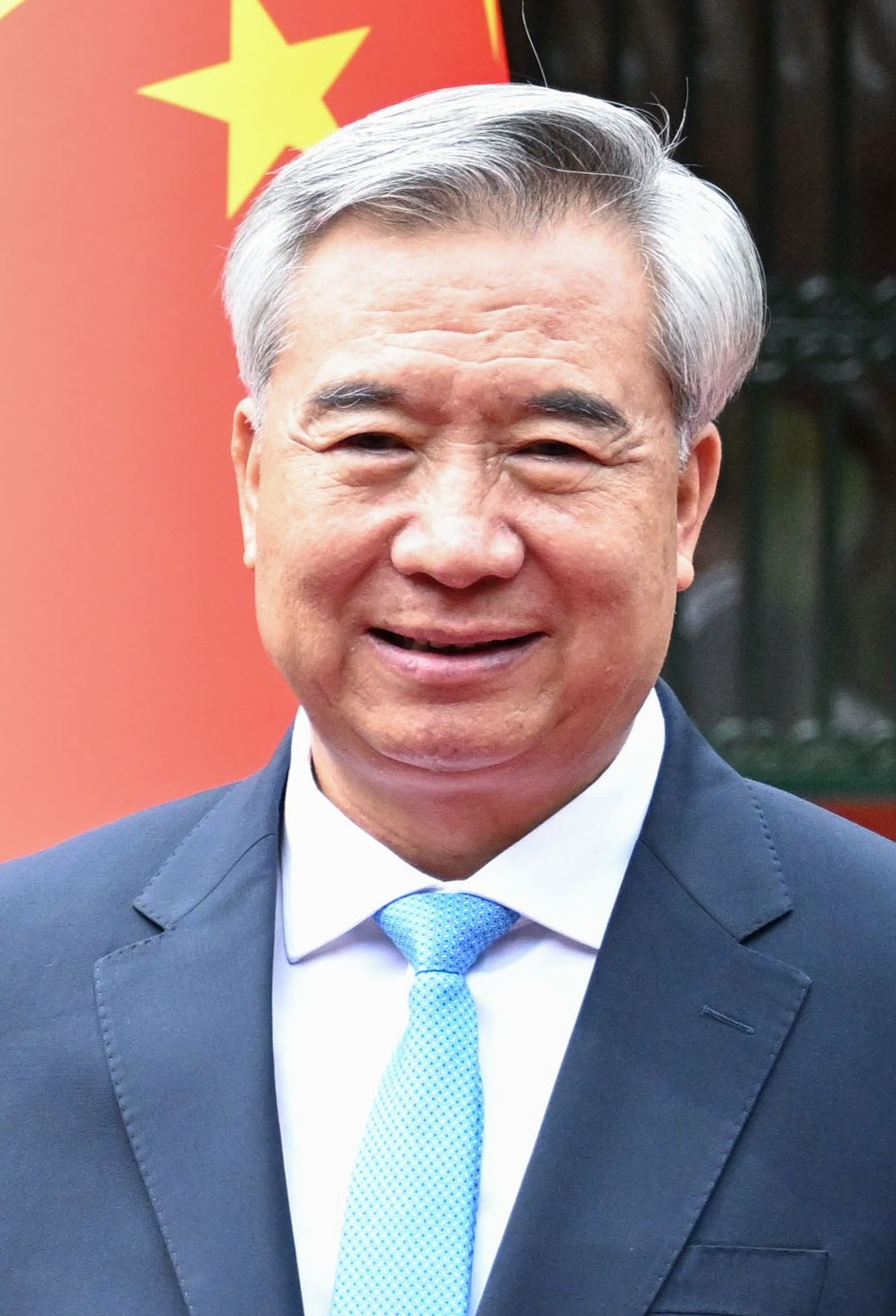
Li Xi (2022–)

The secretaries of the Central Commission for Discipline Inspection since Xi Jinping took office in 2012

The agency directly charged with overseeing the campaign is the CCDI, which, at the time of the campaign, was headed by Secretary Wang Qishan, a politician known for his work in the financial sector and one of the seven members of the CCP Politburo Standing Committee. Wang was in charge of the day-to-day execution of the campaign. The CCDI's official mandate is to enforce party discipline, combat malfeasance, and punish party members for committing offenses. The CCDI is an internal agency of the party and therefore does not have judicial authority. In general, the CCDI investigates officials and, when necessary, forwards evidence gathered to judicial organs, such as the Supreme People's Procuratorate (in charge of investigation and prosecution), which proceeds to charge the accused with criminal wrongdoing and move the case to trial.

While the CCDI formally reports into the CCP National Congress, nominally the highest representative body of the party which gathers once every five years, and is intended to be an 'independent' agency from a constitutional standpoint, in practice ultimate oversight of the agency falls under the purview of Xi Jinping by virtue of holding the office of General Secretary (i.e., de facto leader). Xi, who also directs anti-graft efforts of the military through his holding the office of Chairman of the Central Military Commission (i.e., commander-in-chief). The majority of reporting on the campaign by media sources has highlighted Xi Jinping's direct involvement in managing the campaign, which has become a central hallmark of his term in office. However, formal disciplinary measures meted out to high-ranking officials, such as former Politburo members, must undergo ratification by the sitting Politburo. According to The Wall Street Journal, anti-corruption punishment to officials at or above the vice ministerial level need approval from Xi.

The power of anti-corruption is centralized in the CCP Politburo Standing Committee by undermining the original functions of the local Discipline Inspection Commissions. Coordination of anti-corruption efforts in the provinces and state-owned enterprises has been carried out by "central inspection teams" (中央巡视组), which reports to the Central Leading Group for Inspection Work, which, like the CCDI, was also led by Wang Qishan. The inspection teams are typically 'stationed' for a few months at the organization they were tasked with overseeing, and are in charge of thorough audits into the conduct of officials and organizational practices. The inspection teams send the results of the audits to the CCDI to enact formal investigative procedures such as Shuanggui (the practice of detaining individual party members for investigation).

The proposed constitutional changes published on 25 February 2018 envisioned the creation of a new anti-graft state agency that merges various anti-corruption government departments. The thus formed National Supervisory Commission is the highest state supervisory body in the country, and holds same constitutional status as that of the State Council, of the Supreme People's Court, and of the Supreme People's Procuratorate, outranking courts and the office of the prosecutor. Effectively functioning as the state arm of the CCDI, the commission covers all public servants, whether or not they're CCP members. Additionally under Xi, the resident discipline offices and inspectors have been embedded to cover all central agencies and state ministries.

== Chronology ==
=== Background ===
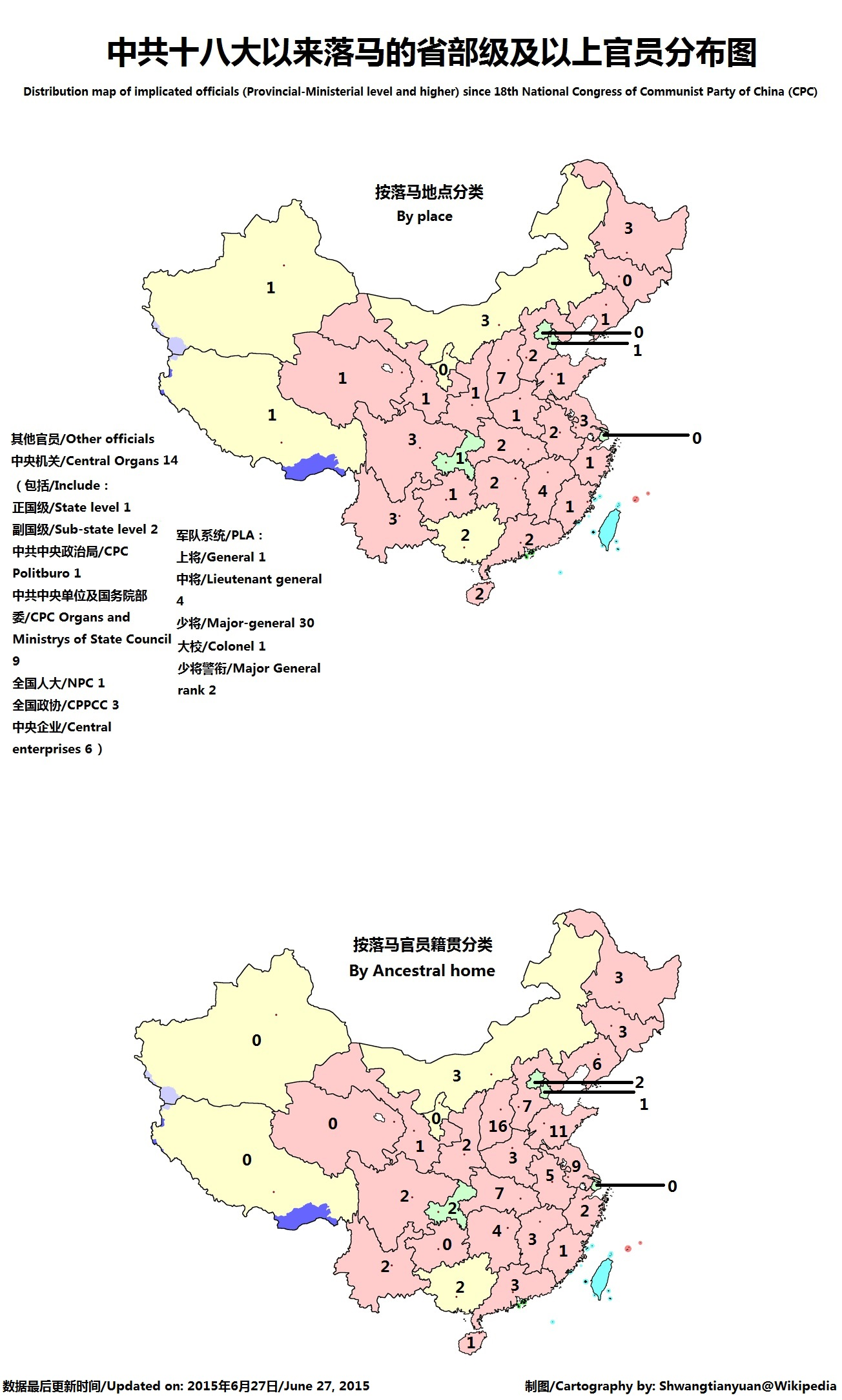
A distribution map of implicated officials (Provincial-Ministerial level and higher) since the 18th National Congress of the Chinese Communist Party.

Anti-corruption efforts have been on the agenda of successive Chinese leaders, though the effectiveness of these campaigns has varied. Since the reform and opening up began in 1978, political corruption in China has grown significantly. The types of offenses vary, though usually they involve trading bribes for political favours, such as local businesses trying to secure large government contracts or subordinates seeking promotions for higher office.

We should continue to catch "tigers", as well as "flies" when dealing with cases of leading officials in violation of Party discipline and state laws as well as misconduct and corruption problems that directly affect the people's interests. All are equal before the law and Party discipline; whoever is involved in a corruption case must be thoroughly and impartially investigated.

— Xi Jinping, "Power Must Be "Caged" by the System", Qiushi, 22 January 2013,

At the 18th National Congress, both outgoing General Secretary Hu Jintao and incoming party leader Xi Jinping repeatedly emphasized that corruption is a threat to the party's survival. Xi made special mention of corruption in his inaugural speech as General Secretary on 15 November 2012. In his first days in office, Xi vowed to crack down on "tigers and flies", that is, high-ranking officials and petty civil servants alike. He also warned his colleagues on the Politburo that corruption would "doom the party and state." Xi proposed to eliminate the "Four Bad Work Styles" of "formalism, bureaucratism, hedonism, and extravagance" (the latter two referring to types of corruption) from the CCP.

In other cases, some violate the regulation regarding officials reporting major personal matters...Some [Cadres] do not report the fact that their children or spouses have stayed abroad for a long time. According to regulations, officials should report to the Party organization if their family members settle down abroad. They think it is unnecessary to report since their family members have not officially settled down abroad. Some do not report major changes in their family situation. Even after they have been divorced or remarried for years, the Party organization is still kept in the dark. Some have many passports and even fake ID cards. Should not these things be reported? According to the rules, they should report them. Why do some keep such things unreported? One reason is that they do not know the rules, and the other is that they have ulterior motives.

Recent years of investigations into serious violations of Party discipline and state laws by high-ranking officials, Zhou Yongkang, Bo Xilai, Xu Caihou, Ling Jihua and Su Rong in particular, show that violations of the Party's political discipline and political rules have become a prominent problem and must be treated with the utmost importance. In the case of such people, the greater power and higher position they hold, the less they take the Party's political discipline and rules seriously. Some of their conduct is outrageous. Driven by their overinflated political ambitions and eagerness to acquire personal gain or the benefit of their inner circle, some resort to political conspiracies against the Party and plot to undermine and divide it.

— Xi Jinping, "Observe Discipline and Rules", Qiushi, 13 January 2015,

Around 20 days after Xi assumed office as general secretary, the Politburo issued the Eight-point Regulation, stressing reforms such as prohibiting private use of public cars, reduce and simplify official meetings, and prohibit expensive meals and showy official trips. In January 2013, the CCDI held a meeting to mobilize for the anti-corruption campaign. It was announced that the campaign would be implemented directly from Beijing by dispatching inspection teams with full power with no limits or quotas. The powers of the CCDI were also expanded, which was given enhanced power over local CDIs so that local officials could not interfere with its affairs. By July 2013, CCDI had sent out ten roving inspection teams led by retired ministerial-level officials to the provinces, state-owned enterprises, and other units. The number of inspection teams increased from 20 in 2012, 39 in 2014, 82 in 2015, to more than one hundred in 2016. In 2015, the CCDI issued a list of one hundred "most wanted" suspects for corruption crimes.

=== First regional inspections ===
The first salvos of the campaign were the abrupt sacking of Sichuan CCP deputy committee secretary Li Chuncheng, which took place in December 2012, shortly after Xi took office as leader of the CCP. The first batch of central inspection teams was dispatched in the third quarter of 2013 to various Chinese provinces, including Jiangxi, Inner Mongolia, Chongqing, and Hubei. A handful of provincial-level officials were investigated for corruption and removed from office as a result of the first round of inspection work. Of these regions, the inspection team in charge of Jiangxi uncovered far-reaching official corruption in the province, bringing down about a dozen officials, including Lieutenant Governor Yao Mugen. The inspection work in Hubei province also resulted in about a dozen cases, including that of Lieutenant Governor Guo Youming. In Inner Mongolia, head of the party's regional United Front department Wang Suyi was detained.

=== 'Encircling' Zhou Yongkang ===
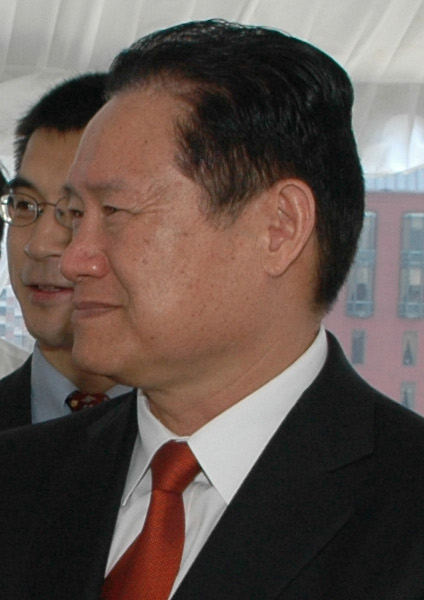
Zhou Yongkang was the first Politburo Standing Committee member investigated for corruption in history

Meanwhile, in the latter half of 2013, a separate operation began to investigate officials with connections to Zhou Yongkang, former Politburo Standing Committee member and national security chief. Three sectors in which Zhou was known to carry immense influence were targeted for investigation, including the national oil sector (where Zhou was once a chief executive), Sichuan province (where Zhou was party chief), and security organs (once under the jurisdiction of the Central Political and Legal Affairs Commission, which Zhou headed). Senior officials, such as former China Petroleum chief executive Jiang Jiemin, senior Sichuan officials Li Chongxi and Guo Yongxiang, and former deputy minister of public security Li Dongsheng, were all dismissed in 2013. Many of Zhou's former secretaries who later received promotions, including Ji Wenlin, Tan Li, Shen Dingcheng, and Li Hualin, were also rounded up for investigation.

The fall of Jiang Jiemin – who were seen as a close confidant of Zhou Yongkang and who also held membership on the elite Central Committee of the Chinese Communist Party – in September 2013 was seen as an unmistakable sign that the net was closing in on Zhou himself. On 15 December 2013, The New York Times, in a front-page article, confirmed that Zhou Yongkang was the ultimate target of the campaign, and that it would be only a matter of time before the investigation was made public. On 30 January 2014, Caixin, a Chinese website known for its investigative journalism, released a video and an accompanying article entitled "The Three 'White Gloves' of Zhou Bin", detailing allegations about the wrongdoing of Zhou Yongkang's son, without mentioning the senior Zhou directly as a means to skirt censorship rules. Zhou's targeting broke the long-standing convention of "PSC criminal immunity" (Chinese: 刑不上常委) that had persisted since the end of the Cultural Revolution.

=== Second regional rounds and Shanxi "political earthquake" ===
In November 2013, a second round of inspection teams was dispatched. These teams were sent to the provinces of Shanxi, Jilin, Yunnan, Anhui, Hunan and Guangdong, as well as the Xinhua News Agency, the Ministry of Commerce, and the state-owned company overseeing the construction of the Three Gorges Dam. In Guangdong, the inspections resulted in the abrupt downfall of the populist party chief of the provincial capital, Guangzhou, Wan Qingliang. In Yunnan, former provincial party chief Bai Enpei and Vice Governor Shen Peiping were implicated in corruption and detained.

In Shanxi, a coal-producing province in central China, the stationed inspection team picked up on a corruption labyrinth that seeped into almost all aspects of governance in the province, particularly the collusion between local politicians and business elites, most of whom ran coal companies. The inspection initially resulted in the dismissal of CCP deputy committee secretary Jin Daoming, Vice Governor Du Shanxue, and Ling Zhengce, the brother of the once-powerful chief presidential aide Ling Jihua.

The political drama in Shanxi played out over the third quarter of 2014, as the province experienced a wholesale cleansing of its political establishment with ferocity unseen in post-Mao era China. Between 23 and 29 August 2014, four sitting members of the province's top governing council, the provincial Party Standing Committee, were sacked in quick succession, giving rise to what became known as the "great Shanxi political earthquake". The province's CCP committee secretary Yuan Chunqing was then abruptly transferred out of office, as the central authorities 'parachuted' then Jilin party chief Wang Rulin to take his place. During the transfer-of-power announcement in the provincial capital Taiyuan, Politburo Standing Committee member Liu Yunshan sat centre stage as party organization officials and provincial politicians ran the motions and exchanged obligatory political declarations to stabilize the province and maintain unwavering loyalty to the party centre.

=== Fall of the "Four Big Tigers" ===
As the public awaited word on the fate of Zhou Yongkang amid intense rumours circulating inside the country and in international media, on 30 June, an announcement came from Beijing that General Xu Caihou, former member of the Politburo and vice chairman of the Central Military Commission from 2004 to 2013, was being expelled from the party for taking bribes in exchange for promotions, and facing criminal prosecution. The CMC Vice-chairman position is the highest position held by a military officer in China, as the chairmanship (commander-in-chief) is customarily occupied by a civilian. Xu was the highest-ranked PLA military officer ever to be implicated in corruption and the first Politburo member investigated for corruption since the sacking of former Chongqing party chief Bo Xilai. Unlike the steady build-up of speculation surrounding the Zhou case, the announcement of Xu's expulsion from the party came without any apparent warning. Reports later surfaced that the 71-year-old general, who was going through medical treatment for bladder cancer at 301 Military Hospital in Beijing, was taken from his sickbed in March 2014 to be investigated.

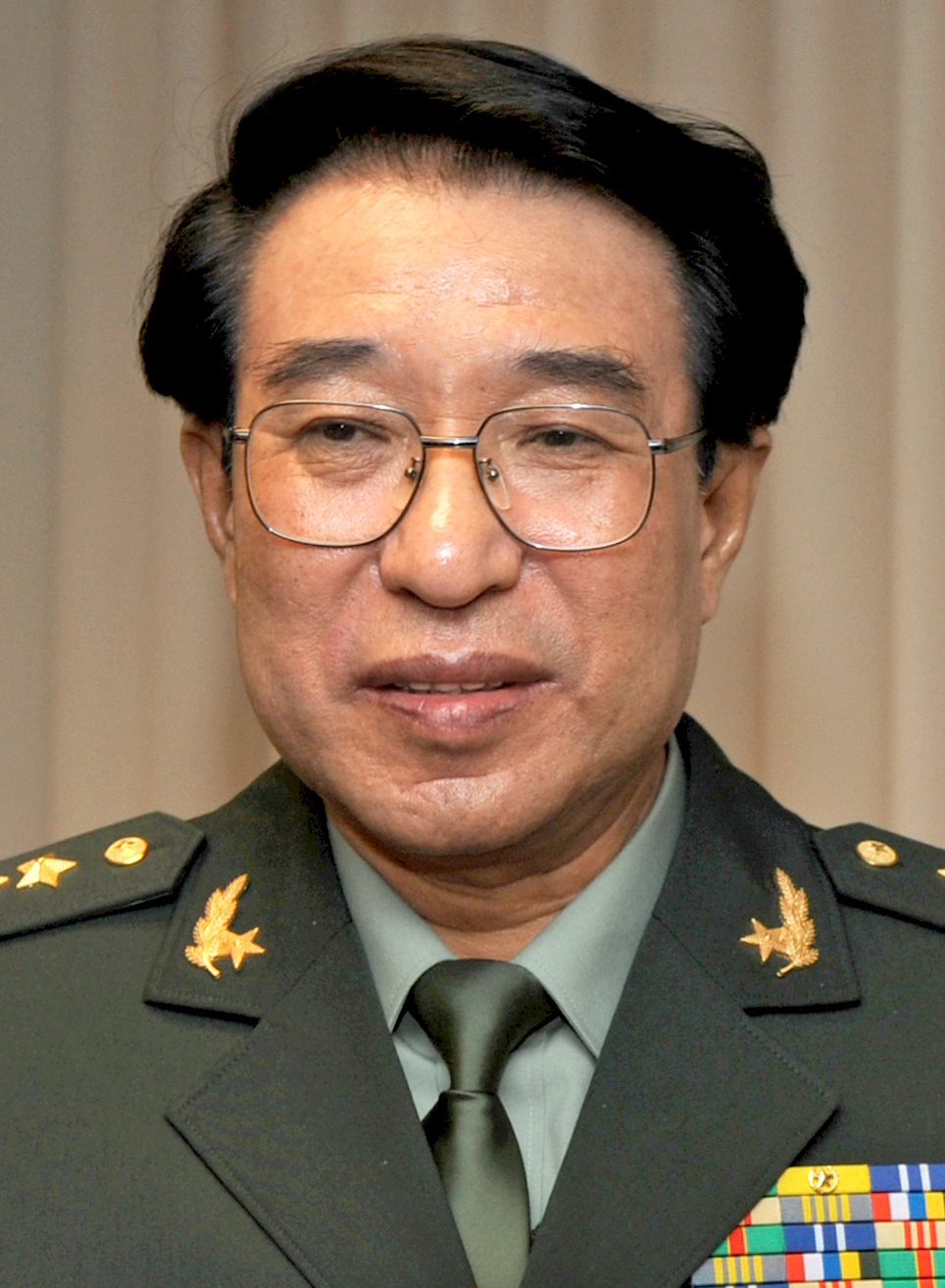
General Xu Caihou became the highest-ranking military officer in PLA history to be investigated for corruption.

A month after Xu's fall, on 30 July 2014, state media finally broke months of silence on Zhou Yongkang with a press release naming him the subject of an investigation into "severe disciplinary violations". The terse news bulletin, carried throughout Chinese media, signalled that Zhou was "no longer a comrade" but did not discuss criminal wrongdoing. Zhou was likely placed under some form of house arrest long prior to the announcement. The official confirmation that Zhou was under investigation made him the first Politburo Standing Committee member to fall from grace since the end of the Cultural Revolution, and broke the unspoken rule of "PSC criminal immunity" that has been the norm for over three decades. Moreover, it was unusual that the case against Zhou was pursued despite his having retired from office in 2012. Prior to Xi's ascension to power, corruption cases were typically targeted at incumbent Politburo members, such as Chen Xitong, Chen Liangyu, and Bo Xilai. Zhou would be formally expelled from the party in December 2014, after the Politburo reviewed findings of his case. The internal investigation concluded that Zhou abused his power, maintained extramarital affairs with multiple women, took massive bribes, exchanged money and favours for sex, and "leaked state and party secrets."

The fourth quarter of 2014 saw another flurry of officials detained for investigation. Criminal proceedings had also begun. On July 31, Wang Suyi was sentenced to fifteen years in prison for bribery. On August 5, Tong Mingqian was convicted of dereliction of duty in a vote-buying scandal and sentenced to five years in prison. In September 2014, the trial of former economic official Liu Tienan became the first high-profile televised trial of the campaign. On camera, a teary-eyed Liu recanted his crimes and lamented having ruined the future of his son, who was said to be complicit in his corrupt activities.

On 22 December 2014, Ling Jihua, former senior aide to former CCP general secretary Hu Jintao and a political star whose ambitions were quashed by the untimely death of his Ferrari-driving son, also fell under the anti-graft dragnet. Ling was serving as the head of the party's United Front Work Department at the time, and was also vice chairman of the Chinese People's Political Consultative Conference (CPPCC), a legislative advisory body. Ling hailed from the prominent Linghu political family from Pinglu County, Shanxi. Several of his relatives were reported as having been investigated beginning in the third quarter of 2014, in what seemed to be another 'encirclement campaign' similar to what was happening with Zhou Yongkang. It was later alleged that Ling served as somewhat of a ringleader for the so-called Xishan Society, a secret society-like network of high officials from Shanxi province.

Su Rong, the fourth 'big tiger' who was then also serving as CPPCC Vice-chairman, was already 'netted' earlier in the year, but was officially expelled from the party in February 2015. Su was better known for his lengthy career as party chief in three Chinese provinces, but his term in Jiangxi (2007–2013), where corruption was said to have flourished under his watch, was cited as the major reason for his downfall.

=== Continuation of the campaign ===
By 2015, 138,867 party members were punished in accordancy with the Eight-point Regulation. A media campaign accompanied the anti-corruption campaign. In 2017, the TV show In the Name of the People, which had gotten funding from the Supreme People's Procuratorate, premiered. From January to November 2016, 35,800 cases of Eight-point Regulation" violations involving 50,800 party members were investigated, and 37,000 were punished. Xi also ordered that all central investigations be repeated for a second time to net those who escaped scrutiny, a practice which has been adopted since. Anti-corruption efforts intensified in 2017. The central inspection teams had concluded twelve rounds of inspections with 160 inspections covering 277 localities and units by this time.

In October 2017, Chinese media reported that 440 officials among the central leadership were investigated and punished, including 40 members and alternate members of the Central Committee. More than one million corruption cases were investigated, and more than two million party members and cadres were punished; of these were about 1,343,000 party members and cadres at or above the township level, and 648,000 party members and cadres in the rural areas, a total of nearly two million cadres. The government also claimed the Operation Sky Net and Operation Fox Hunt had extradited 3,453 fugitives from more than ninety countries and ¥9.51 billion were retrieved, with 48 out of a list of one hundred "most wanted" suspects had been returned to China. In addition, 79 officials in the CCDI and CDI, the overseers of the campaign, were disciplined; 160,000 cases of violating the Eight-point Regulation were investigated, while 136,100 were punished. In 2016, 57,000 party members turned themselves in and confessed wrongdoing; and 160,000 public complaints were received by the eleventh round of inspections, and 110,000 complaints against the SOEs were received.

During Xi's second term, the anti-corruption's focus shifted to lower level officials. While a total of 26 officials of provincial-ministerial rank or higher were put under investigation from 2012 to 2017, more than the total under Jiang Zemin and Hu Jintao, the number of provincial-ministerial rank officials under investigation from 2017 to 2022 was 13.

In January 2025, at the third plenary session of the 20th Central Commission for Discipline Inspection, Xi said that "the fight against corruption has won an overwhelming victory and has been comprehensively consolidated" but warned that the situations "remains grim and complicated", reiterating that corruption remains the "biggest threat" to the CCP, reaffirming the government's continued determination to confront entrenched corruption and strengthen internal discipline.

=== Anti-corruption work in the military ===
In September 2023, Reuters reported that Defense Minister Li Shangfu was under anti-corruption investigations by the Commission for Discipline Inspection of the CMC (CMCCDI). His absence had been observed and speculated on by U.S. government officials, who told the Financial Times they believed that Li was under investigation. On 24 October 2023, the sixth meeting of the Standing Committee of the 14th National People's Congress (NPC) decided to remove Li from the posts of State Councilor and Minister of National Defense. He was also removed from the CMC. On 27 June 2024, the CCP Politburo announced that Li, along with former defense minister Wei Fenghe, have been expelled from the party for "disciplinary and law violations", and the case has been referred to the PLA's procuratorial organs for criminal prosecution, with Li being accused of accepting financial bribes as well as bribing others. Both the men were also stripped of their rank of general. In July 2024, the 3rd Plenary Session of the 20th CCP Central Committee confirmed the decision to expel Li.

In April 2025, the Financial Times reported that Central Military Commission Vice Chairman He Weidong had been arrested, placed under anti-corruption investigations and was removed from his post as vice chairman of the Central Military Commission. In June 2025, Miao Hua, a senior admiral and head of the political work department of CMC, was dismissed following an investigation for "serious violations of discipline," a term commonly used to indicate corruption. His removal made him one of the highest-ranking CMC officials to be purged since the 1960s and the eighth CMC member to be ousted since Xi Jinping came to power in 2012. Miao, who had been suspended in 2024 and expelled from the National People's Congress in April 2025, was among several senior military figures targeted in Xi's ongoing anti-corruption campaign, which has increasingly focused on military procurement and has raised concerns over the image of China's armed forces.

On 17 October 2025, the Ministry of National Defense announced that He was expelled from the CCP and the PLA for "serious violations of discipline and law". He was replaced by Zhang Shengmin. His removal as the First-ranked CMC Vice Chairman was the first since the fall of Zhao Ziyang (also the CCP General Secretary) after the 1989 Tiananmen Square protests and massacre. He, along with eight other senior military officials, was investigated and punished for "serious violations of Party discipline and law" and "suspected of major duty-related crimes". A spokesperson for the Defense Ministry stated that the violations involved "exceptionally large amounts of money" and were of an "extremely serious nature and with extremely negative impacts". Reports indicated that He Weidong's expulsion was also linked to accusations of political disloyalty and personal misconduct described by official sources as "loss of chastity," suggesting violations of party discipline beyond financial corruption. On 27 December 2025, He Weidong was disqualified as a deputy to the National People's Congress along four other military officers including He Hongjun, Wang Peng, Wang Renhua and Zhang Hongbing.

On 24 January 2026, the Ministry of National Defense announced that CMC Vice Chairman Zhang Youxia and Chief of Staff of the Joint Staff Department of the Central Military Commission Liu Zhenli were placed under investigation due to a decision by the CCP Central Committee over suspected "serious violations of discipline." The South China Morning Post reported Zhang was arrested on 19 January. It also reported that top CCP officials were briefed about Zhang's case on 23 January, and that Zhang was suspected of corruption, failing to rein in his close associates, family members and relatives and for not flagging problems to the party leadership at the first instance. The People's Liberation Army Daily published an editorial stating that Zhang and Liu had "severely trampled on and undermined the CMC Chairman responsibility system". This was a more severe characterization than the previous characterization of the charges against He Weidong.

On 7 May 2026, Wei Fenghe and Li Shangfu were sentenced to death with reprieve for corruption.

== Regional profiles ==
Several provinces have faced the brunt of the anti-corruption campaign: Guangdong, Shanxi, Sichuan, and Jiangsu. In addition to tackling corruption, the campaign has also had the effect of reducing regional factionalism and dissecting entrenched patron-client networks that have flourished since the beginning of economic reforms in the 1980s. Xi Jinping had declared in his speeches that internal factionalism is as harmful to the party's ability to govern as corruption. As of November 2015, all 31 provincial-level divisions, including municipalities like Beijing and Shanghai, which were once considered to be relatively free of corruption, have seen at least one provincial-level official investigated for corruption.

=== Prevalence of party chiefs from provincial capitals ===
Notably, many of those investigated had served in the past as CCP committee secretaries of provincial capitals, making the position especially 'susceptible' for investigation. For example, Taiyuan (Chen Chuanping, Shen Weichen), Nanning (Yu Yuanhui), Jinan (Wang Min), Guangzhou (Wan Qingliang), Nanjing (Yang Weize), Xining (Mao Xiaobing), Urumqi (Li Zhi), Lanzhou (Lu Wucheng), Kunming (Qiu He, Zhang Tianxin, Gao Jinsong), and Chengdu (Li Chuncheng).

=== Shanxi ===
Of the most heavily targeted provinces, Shanxi has been the most notable 'disaster zone', with a total of nine officials of provincial rank investigated or dismissed for corruption, five of whom were sitting members of the provincial party standing committee, the province's highest de facto governing body. At the time of the 18th National Congress in November 2012, there were 13 seats on the provincial standing committee. By March 2015, less than a year after the "political earthquake", only three members of the original group remained, and only two members were born and raised in Shanxi province. The remainder have been removed from office, transferred out of the province, or otherwise replaced, indicating that the central authorities from Beijing had essentially 'taken over' political control of the province from Shanxi locals. Moreover, many municipal and local district leaders were also sacked and investigated for corruption in quick succession, such as in the cities of Datong, Lüliang, Yuncheng, Yangquan, and the provincial capital Taiyuan. According to official data, in 2013 alone, 26 officials of prefecture-department rank (厅局级) and 336 officials of county-division rank (县处级) were disciplined in Shanxi province.

In 2014, 17 county-level party chiefs were investigated in Shanxi. The inspection teams in the province uncovered widespread collusion between those who hold political power and the "coal bosses" who stack their wallets in exchange for favourable treatment in approving development projects. Even officials who were previously seen as incorruptible eventually caved in to the systemic culture of graft. At one point in 2015, the anti-corruption campaign was so intense that 300 government jobs were vacant.

=== Guangdong ===
In Guangdong, the campaign severely upset the political ecosystem that had long been dominated by native Cantonese politicians. Wan Qingliang, the popular and relatively youthful party chief of Guangzhou known for his frugality and accessibility, was sacked in the third quarter of 2014 and was also replaced by an outsider, former Tianjin vice mayor Ren Xuefeng. The province's top political advisor, Zhu Mingguo, also became one of the few incumbent officials of full provincial rank to be investigated for corruption. Lieutenant Governor Liu Zhigeng, another native Cantonese official who was once the party chief of Dongguan, and Zhuhai party chief Li Jia, who had spent his entire political career in Guangdong, were also sacked. The breaking down of local patronage networks had already begun before the 18th National Congress, and continued with greater intensity following the Congress under newly anointed party chief Hu Chunhua. The party leadership team in Shenzhen, China's most successful Special Economic Zone, also underwent significant changes, with party chief Wang Rong moving to a provincial office; several of Wang's subordinates were investigated for corruption.

=== Yangtze River Delta ===
In Jiangsu, home province of former party leader Jiang Zemin and disgraced security chief Zhou Yongkang, several 'native sons' with seemingly promising political futures underwent investigation. Nanjing mayor Ji Jianye was the "first tiger" to fall in the province. His dismissal was trumpeted by the city's then party chief Yang Weize, as having "removed a tumour" from the provincial capital. In January 2015, Yang himself was also detained for investigation. Former provincial party secretary-general Zhao Shaolin and Executive Vice Governor Li Yunfeng were also rounded up for investigation.

Zhejiang, 'home turf' of CCP general secretary Xi Jinping and the site of much smaller-scale anti-corruption experimentation during Xi's term as party chief there, had been largely spared of high-profile political changes in the wake of the anti-corruption campaign. Whether this is because Xi instilled a puritan political culture in the province during his tenure there or because officials with patronage links to him were given favourable treatment was unclear. As of 2016, former provincial CCP Standing Committee member Si Xinliang was the sole high official from the province to be investigated for disciplinary offenses.

=== Inner Mongolia ===
From January 2020 to October 2020, 534 cadres in Inner Mongolia were investigated for corruption related to dealings in the coal industry.

=== Hunan ===
In December 2013, 512 out of 529 delegates at the Henyang Prefecture People's Congress in Hunan were disqualified due to allegations of vote-buying.

=== Macau ===
As part of the anti-corruption campaign, in December 2014, central government officials met with local officials in Macau and reached an agreement allowing the central economic crimes bureau to have real-time access to all transactions in Macau involving UnionPay cards. UnionPay transactions had previously been a primary tool for gray-market money transfers from Macau to the rest of China.

=== Central State-owned enterprises ===
Central SOEs were investigated as part of the campaign. The Central Commission for Discipline Inspection began inspections of two central SOEs in 2013, ten in 2014, 43 in 2015, 42 (and the State-owned Assets Supervision and Administration Commission itself) in 2019, and 27 central SOEs in 2023. From the beginning of the campaign through 2017, twelve top executives of core central SOEs were removed from office based on corruption charges.

== Analysis ==
Reaction to the campaign has been mixed. It is believed to enjoy popular support among most ordinary Chinese, but has raised some concerns in the country's legal community. Much of the press coverage surrounding the campaign has included speculation over its aims and the political and economic effects of the campaign.

According to historian and sinologist Wang Gungwu, Xi Jinping inherited a political party that was faced with pervasive corruption and in danger of collapse. Xi and the new generational leaders aimed to eliminate corruption at the higher levels of the CCP because of their belief that only the party was capable of governing China, and that a collapse of the party would be disastrous for the Chinese people. Wang further adds, "Xi Jinping obviously believes that his anti-corruption campaign was vital to enable him to save the Party."

=== Political motives ===
==== "Purge" and "factional warfare" hypotheses ====
Academics have characterized Xi's anti-corruption campaign as a political purge.

In 2014, the British news magazine The Economist wrote in its "Banyan" column, "it is hard not to see corruption allegations as the latter-day weapon of choice in the winner-takes-all power struggles that the party has always suffered". Meanwhile, He Pin, editor at overseas Chinese news portal Boxun, likened Zhou Yongkang, Bo Xilai, Ling Jihua, and Xu Caihou to a latter-day "Gang of Four", whose real crime was not corruption but conspiring to usurp power. Chinese writer Murong Xuecun, a continual critic of the CCP, wrote in an opinion article "In my view, Xi's anti-corruption campaign looks more like a Stalinist political purge... he relies on the regulations of the party and not on the laws of the state, the people carrying it out operate like the KGB, and most cases cannot be reported on with any transparency."

Factional struggle has been proposed as another explanation. The Economist in 2014 cited a study by an Australian scholar, which concluded that no Princelings, or descendants of the early Communist revolutionaries, otherwise known as the "red second generation", have been targets of the anti-corruption campaign. Xi himself is considered a princeling; some also consider CCDI chief Wang Qishan a princeling through his father-in-law. However, the cohesiveness of the princelings as a political faction with similar policy preferences has not been well established. Indeed, just prior to Xi's ascension to power, Bo Xilai, arguably China's most high-profile princeling, was ousted from office as party chief of Chongqing and member of the Politburo. At the same time, between 2013 and 2015, almost all the high-level officials investigated or removed from office were from 'commoner' backgrounds, most of them farmers. By 2024, the influence of princelings under Xi declined significantly; according to Voice of America, Xi "effectively excluded the second generation of princelings of his generation from China's highest decision-making and provincial-ministerial leadership".

The profiles of several prominent Chinese nuclear, missile, and radar experts were removed from the Chinese Academy of Engineering's website, following a series of purges linked to Xi Jinping's anti-corruption campaign. These removals are seen as part of broader efforts impacting China's military and scientific leadership.

==== "Reducing elder influence" and "institution-building" theories ====
Other observers acknowledge the campaign may be intended to achieve political ends but depict its ultimate aims as something far less sinister. Li Weidong, former editor of the Reform magazine in China, told Voice of America that by signalling that no one is off limits and by targeting retired officials, the campaign aimed to reduce the undue influence of party "elders" who were no longer in office but nevertheless wanted to interfere in political affairs. Writing for Radio Free Asia, Liu Qing, among others, suggest that the campaign's main aim was to extinguish vestiges of the influence of former CCP general secretary Jiang Zemin.

Jiang's time in power saw a marked increase in patronage appointments that spanned the military, the provinces, and the party apparatus. Patron-client relationships, rather than merit, became the primary factor in securing promotions, giving rise to the formation of internal factions based on personal loyalty. Prominent examples of factions identified by observers include Jiang's Shanghai clique, Zhou Yongkang's spheres of influence in the state oil and public security sectors, and the so-called Xishan Society of Shanxi officials – apart from these well-known cases, political factionalism seemed to be the order of the day down to the lowest levels of party bureaucracy. This meant that factional patrons often exerted massive influence through informal channels rather than through the offices they hold. Indeed, the refusal of Jiang Zemin to relinquish his influence years after he had formally left office was said to have caused much unease with the party rank-and-file. It also had unduly constrained the ability of his successor, Hu Jintao to enact systemic reforms or to carry out a cohesive agenda. By reversing this part of Jiang's legacy, some observers believe, Xi would be better equipped to discipline and unite the party under a common agenda. Proponents of this view believe that the ultimate aim of the campaign is to strengthen the role of institutions and stamp out factionalism and networks of personal loyalty, thereby creating a more united and meritocratic organization and achieving greater efficiency for governance.

==== "Positive change" hypothesis ====
Several Chinese-language media sources rejected the notion that the corruption campaign should be likened to a political purge, calling this view naive and overly cynical. Duowei wrote that the campaign is part of a wider agenda of systemic reform aimed at restoring legitimacy of the CCP's mandate to rule, which – in the decades immediately prior – was heavily challenged by widespread corruption, a widening gap between rich and poor, social injustice, and excessive focus on material wealth. In this view, the campaign is consistent with the other initiatives focused on social justice undertaken by Xi, including pushing ahead legal reform, abolishing re-education through labour, and castigating local officials from meddling in judicial proceedings. Moreover, many officials implicated in the campaign were long retired or no longer serving in influential roles, and therefore posed no direct political threats to the incumbent administration. Chinese sociologist Hu Xingdou told Deutsche Welle that the campaign was only the first stage of a long-term strategy aimed at genuinely tackling corruption and speculated that the second stage would include the establishment of independent anti-corruption organs.

Brookings Institution China scholar Cheng Li asserted that attributing ulterior motives to the campaign was not only wholly misleading but also unproductive. Li believes that not only has Xi's campaign had the effect of truly curbing corrupt practices at all levels of government, but it has also restored public confidence in the CCP's mandate to rule, and has also returned massive ill-gotten gains back into state coffers, which could be redirected towards economic development. Li also refuted the "political purge" and "factional warfare" hypotheses, contending that Xi's main patrons were Jiang and Jiang's ally Zeng Qinghong, yet major targets of the campaign, such as Xu Caihou, Zhou Yongkang, and Liu Zhijun, were in Jiang's camp, while others affiliated to the purged officials remain in office. His anti-corruption drive has widespread consensus in the party.

The BBC's Jonathan Fenby, among others, believes that the campaign may also be motivated by economic rather than political goals. For example, by tackling graft in state-owned enterprises, seen as bastions of entitlement, entrenched vested interests, and glaring inefficiencies, the government is better able to pursue economic reform programs aimed at liberalizing markets, breaking up monopolies, and reducing state control. Hu Xingdou also suggested the campaign has helped Xi conduct some much-needed "clean-up" of entrenched vested interests before pushing ahead with much larger structural reforms.

Academic Keyu Jin writes that though there may be political motivations behind the campaign, its scope, depth, and sustained effort "prove the seriousness of the intention to sever corrosive links fostered in an era of rapid but disorderly growth."

Neil Thomas and Wang Shengyu of the Asia Society Policy Institute argue that the anti-corruption campaign is part of self-revolution's goal to make the CCP durable in the long-term: "If self-revolution succeeds, and it well might, it could make the CCP a more effective and durable institution—one capable of ruling China indefinitely irrespective of who is at the helm. In that sense, self-revolution is Xi’s effort to render China’s succession concerns moot". They argue the view that the campaign is a "merely a tool of power consolidation" does not explain why the campaign has continued and intensified beyond the 20th Party National Congress in 2022. They add the campaign has remained "far less brutal, far less chaotic, and far more focused on governance than the late-stage purges of dictators such as Mao and Joseph Stalin".

=== Security rationale ===
A December 2020 article in Foreign Policy suggested that decades of corruption inside the CCP had created vulnerabilities exploited by outside intelligence agencies, particularly the Central Intelligence Agency. Purges under the guise of anti-corruption were at least partially motivated by counterintelligence concerns. Further reporting by Axios also revealed that years of corruption from the Hu-Wen era had left the CCP vulnerable to infiltration after Chinese officials discovered that the U.S. intelligence agencies were allegedly paying "promotion fees" for certain government officials; simultaneously to the anti-corruption drive beginning in 2013, dozens of U.S. intelligence assets within China were reportedly executed and arrested.

The Economist has reported that the purge has been justified as a way to increase military readiness after viewing the effects of corruption on the Russian armed forces during the invasion of Ukraine. Some scholars have argued that the purge has weakened Chinese military effectiveness. Others argue that the campaign might allow for a cleaner and less corrupt military to emerge in the long-term.

=== Due process ===
Investigations by the party's disciplinary bodies are not part of the state judicial system. When an official is detained for an investigation, known as Shuanggui, they are essentially placed under house arrest and are isolated from the outside world. The subject often must endure days of grueling interrogation. Data from the first half of 2014 showed that the conviction rate of those who were investigated in that time period was around 99%. The CCDI and its local counterparts usually gather evidence covertly well in advance of detaining the subject. Generally, when an official is announced to be under investigation, the CCDI has already collected an overwhelming amount of hard evidence. China scholar Willy Lam also wrote that the CCDI has seen a massive expansion of its powers since Xi's ascension, and that it was increasingly involved in the governance of the state. Lam also contended that the CCDI seemed to be deriving most of its power from Xi Jinping personally.

Conversely, state media and some observers have pointed out that the CCDI has undergone significant structural reform in recent years aimed at making anti-corruption efforts more depoliticized, rules-based, and process-oriented. For much of its history, the CCDI has been seen as a body that is largely inept at fighting corruption, but during the term of Hu Jintao, the organization began a series of reforms strengthening its independence. Upon Xi's assuming the party leadership, further reforms were enacted to make the CCDI a bona fide control and auditing organization governed by a sophisticated set of rules and regulations to ensure professionalism and procedural fairness. Under Xi, the CCDI became much less likely to face interference from local barons and vested interests in performing its duties.

=== Public perception ===
The anti-corruption campaign has been well received by the Chinese public, which generally views corruption as a major problem. Harvard studies on the attitudes of the Chinese public found that the campaign's approval rating was 71.5% in 2016. Harvard survey data for 2003-2020 also showed that trust in government had increased over the period studied, but particularly following the anti-corruption campaign.Academics Steve Tsang and Olivia Cheung write that by all measures, the campaign has obtained broad support among the public.

There was some initial cynicism among the Chinese public about the intent of the campaign and its effectiveness. Earlier on, domestic and international observers commented on the possibility that the campaign is an emblematic feature of Chinese political culture which has, since its imperial days, invariably attempted to tackle corruption in a high-profile manner when a new leader comes to power. The 2014 ranking of countries by Transparency International's Corruption Perceptions Index ranked China lower than a year before, falling to 100th from 80th place. However, the extent and reach of the campaign have surprised even the most seasoned Chinese political observers.

Some members of the Chinese legal community argue that the lack of an independent judiciary contributes to endemic corruption and that these problems will not be permanently resolved without deeper systemic reforms.

Guanxi and other social customs may have also contributed to the prevalence of practices seen as corrupt from a strictly legal perspective but seem relatively benign from a cultural standpoint. Gift-giving during holidays, securing patrons for career advancement, hosting banquets at expensive restaurants to secure minor deals, exchanging favours, and navigating the complex web of guanxi to get things done was seen as ordinary parts of Chinese life. Indeed, many people did not see these activities as illegal or even morally problematic. Moreover, many regulations and laws governing cadre work and public service were rarely enforced, resulting in two prevailing winds among Chinese officialdom that "if everyone else is doing it, then it must be okay," and that "I probably won't ever be caught anyway".

Following the announcement of the campaign, former Premier Zhu Rongji made a rare public statement voicing support for the campaign.

=== Number of people affected ===
The campaign eventually targeted more than 1,500 senior officials, including about a dozen senior military officers, several executives of state-owned enterprises, and five national leaders. As of 2023, approximately 2.3 million government officials had been prosecuted. The number of people disciplined each year is as follows:

Number of people disciplined each year
| Year | Amount |
|---|---|
| 2010 | 146,517 |
| 2011 | 142,893 |
| 2012 | 160,718 |
| 2013 | 182,038 |
| 2014 | 232,000 |
| 2015 | 336,000 |
| 2016 | 415,000 |
| 2017 | 527,000 |
| 2018 | 621,000 |
| 2019 | 587,000 |
| 2020 | 604,000 |
| 2021 | 627,000 |
| 2022 | 592,000 |
| 2023 | 610,000 |
| 2024 | 889,000 |
| 2025 | 983,000 |

=== Analysis of effects ===
Publishing in 2026, academic Yueduan Wang observes that the campaign is widely considered the most extensive and enduring anti-corruption campaign in Chinese history.

The Eight-point Regulation led a drop in official banqueting and entertainment, as well as a reduction in number of meetings, plan fulfillment celebrations, and land requisitions for official use, expensive government cars, overseas trips, clubs, and "cadre training". It also led to a reduction in vanity projects.

A 2022 study by researchers at the University of Navarra and the University of Manchester suggested that economic corruption (indexed by the greater success of private firms with political connections) increased during the Xi Jinping administration. In particular, corruption involving CCP cadres and so-called "political scammers" has increased.

Melanie Manion, an expert on China's corruption, argues that Xi's anti-corruption campaign has been distinct from previous campaigns in that it features institutionalization and credible commitments to good governance, and that it has been the longest campaign with the most far-reaching impact. The enhancement of the power of the CCDI led to streamlining or severing dual rule at the expense of horizontal leadership by the local authorities, and the campaign has significantly reduced rent-seeking opportunities, as thousands (or tens of thousands at the local levels) of regulations required for doing business before 2012 have been abolished. Removals of the structural incentives also impacted corruption.

The campaign has also led to an overall decrease in petty bribery and open embezzlement. According to the World Bank’s Worldwide Governance Indicators, China has advanced under Xi on metrics of "control of corruption" and "government effectiveness", moving from around the same as other upper-middle-income countries to well above the average. According to one study, the campaign led to stronger environmental protection, leading air pollution at the city-level to decrease by around 20.3 percent. Another study showed that companies lost some of the political protection that protected them from punishment for negative impacts on the environment. The anti-corruption campaign also helped reduce corruption during the battle against poverty that was launched in 2015, with research suggesting that in normally corruption-prone counties, the anti-corruption campaign helped increase poor households’ incomes and reduced poverty by decreasing state expropriation and limiting households' exclusion from transfer payments and formal credit from state financial institutions. In research and development spending, the campaign led to lowered corruption in the allocation of resources, making them "more merit-based and more likely to flow to firms that later produced stronger innovation outcomes".

Luxury sales have been affected by the campaign. During the seven months after December 2013, luxury jewelry imports fell by 55 percent. In her 2023 book The Blind Eye (Danish: Det Blinde Øje), which examines the 2020 mink cull in Denmark, author Mathilde Walter Clark links the decline in global fur prices after 2013 directly to Xi's campaign, arguing that the arrest of several key customers, crackdowns on illegal zero-tariff smuggling to China via Hong Kong, and a more cautious approach by Chinese elites towards projecting wealth were pivotal to the decline.

In 2026, it was reported that an underground market emerged in China for information about officials who could face corruption investigations. Paid online groups shared coded and often unverified claims about officials who might be investigated, which the authorities attempt to shut down.

== See also ==
- Officials implicated by the anti-corruption campaign in China (2012–2017)
- Officials implicated by the anti-corruption campaign in China (2017–2022)
- Officials implicated by the anti-corruption campaign in China (2022–)
- Operation Fox Hunt
- Chinese police overseas service stations
