= Chen Chuanping =

Chinese politician and businessman

- 陈川平

Communist Party Secretary of Taiyuan
- In office September 2010 – August 2014
- Preceded by: Shen Weichen
- Succeeded by: Wu Zhenglong

Vice-Governor of Shanxi
- In office January 2008 – November 2010
- Governor: Wang Jun

Personal details
- Born: February 1962 (age 64) Pinglu County, Shanxi, China
- Party: Chinese Communist Party (1985–2015, expelled)
- Education: Shenyang University; Xi'an Jiaotong University

Chinese name
- Traditional Chinese: 陳川平
- Simplified Chinese: 陈川平
Transcriptions
Standard Mandarin
- Hanyu Pinyin: Chén Chuānpíng

Chen Chuanping (Chinese: 陈川平; born February 1962) is a former Chinese politician and businessman. Chen spent 26 years in state-owned Taiyuan Iron & Steel (Group) Co. Ltd, he served as the president of Taiyuan Iron & Steel (Group) Co. Ltd. from 2001 to 2008. He served as the Communist Party Secretary of Taiyuan between 2010 and 2014. Alongside Ling Jihua, Bai Yun, and others, he was removed from office in August 2014 for corruption, tried on charges of bribery, and sentenced to six years in prison.

== Career ==
Chen was born and raised in Pinglu County, Shanxi province. Two of his later collaborators Ling Jihua and Ling Zhengce were from the same county in Shanxi. After the resumption of university entrance examination, Chen entered Shenyang University in September 1979, studying at the department of mechanics, where he graduated in August 1982. Chen also earned a Master of Science degree from Xi'an Jiaotong University in November 2006.

Chen joined the workforce in August 1982 and joined the Chinese Communist Party in March 1985.

Chen spent much of his earlier career in the steel industry. Beginning in 1982, Chen worked for the Taiyuan Iron and Steel Group, serving as a technologist, director, factory manager, and general manager. Chen served as the chairman of Taiyuan Iron and Steel Group between December 2001 to April 2008. From September 2007 to April 2008, he also served as the chairman of Taigang Stainless Steel.

Chen made a transition from business to politics in 2008. Chen became the Vice Governor of Shanxi in January of that year, and remained in the position until November 2010. In September 2010, Chen was appointed the Party Secretary of the provincial capital Taiyuan and a member of the provincial Party Standing Committee, succeeding Shen Weichen.

== Downfall ==
On August 23, 2014, Chen was being investigated by the Central Commission for Discipline Inspection (CCDI) for "serious violations of laws and regulations". On August 28, Chen was removed from his government posts by the Chinese government.

On February 17, 2015, at the conclusion of the CCDI investigation, Chen was expelled from the Communist Party. The investigation concluded that Chen "accepted bribes personally and through his family, used his political position to obtain illicit gain for the activities of his friends and family and for the promotion of officials and caused major loss of state assets." He was also indicted on charges of criminal bribery and abuse of power, and his case transferred to judicial authorities for prosecution. Chen was sentenced to six and a half years in prison for taking bribes and abuse of power, and fined 300,000 yuan.

Party political offices
Preceded by Shen Weichen	Communist Party Secretary of Taiyuan; 2010–2014	Succeeded by Wu Zhenglong
