= YBC =

YBC may refer to:

- Baie-Comeau Airport - IATA code
- Yale Babylonian Collection
- Yamagata Broadcasting Company
- Yarichin Bitch Club
- Yerevan Brandy Company
- Yeshiva Boys Choir
- Yokohama B-Corsairs
- Youth Business China
