= Yun Gongmin =

Chinese politician

- 云公民

General Manager of China Huadian Corporation
- In office June 2008 – November 2013
- Preceded by: Cao Peixi
- Succeeded by: Li Qingkui

Vice-Vhairman of Shenhua Group
- In office October 2006 – June 2008

Deputy Communist Party Secretary of Shanxi
- In office June 2003 – October 2006
- Communist Party Secretary: Tian Chengping

Communist Party Secretary of Taiyuan
- In office September 2001 – January 2006
- Preceded by: Hou Wujie
- Succeeded by: Shen Weichen

Vice Governor of Shanxi
- In office July 2001 – November 2001
- Governor: Liu Zhenhua

Vice-Chairman of Inner Mongolia
- In office January 1997 – July 2001
- Chairman: Uliji→Yun Bulong→Uyunqimg

Communist Party Secretary of Yih Ju League
- In office January 1995 – October 1996
- Preceded by: Chen Qihou
- Succeeded by: Xing Yun

Mayor of Yih Ju League
- In office May 1993 – January 1995
- Preceded by: Hu Zhi'an
- Succeeded by: Xing Yun (politician)

Personal details
- Born: September 1950 (age 76) Hohhot, Inner Mongolia, China
- Party: Chinese Communist Party (expelled; 1979-2020)
- Education: Tsinghua University

Chinese name
- Traditional Chinese: 雲公民
- Simplified Chinese: 云公民
Transcriptions
Standard Mandarin
- Hanyu Pinyin: Yún Gōngmín

Yun Gongmin (Chinese: 云公民; born September 1950) is a retired Chinese politician of Mongol ethnicity. He entered the workforce in August 1968, and joined the Chinese Communist Party in January 1979. He was investigated by the Central Commission for Discipline Inspection (CCDI), the party's internal disciplinary body, and the National Supervisory Commission, the highest anti-corruption agency of China, in October 2019. He retired in November 2013 after five years as the deputy Communist Party Secretary and general manager of China Huadian Corporation, one of China's largest power companies, between 2008 and 2013.

== Early life and education ==
Yun was born in September 1950. During the Down to the Countryside Movement, he was a sent-down youth in Gucheng Township of Togtoh County. From 1971 to 1975 he was a worker at a transportation company in Hohhot. In 1975 he was accepted to Tsinghua University, majoring in automobile making, where he graduated in 1979.

== Career ==
After graduation, he involved in politics. He took the role of Inner Mongolia government's vice-chairman in January 1997 and was transferred to Shanxi province as vice-governor in July 2001. He concurrently served as Communist Party Secretary of Taiyuan between September 2001 and January 2006. In June 2003 he was elevated to deputy Communist Party Secretary of Shanxi, a position he held until October 2006. From October 2006 to June 2008 he was vice chairman and deputy Party Branch Secretary of Shenhua Group, a state-owned mining and energy company. He became general manager and deputy Party Branch Secretary of China Huadian Corporation in June 2008, serving in the post until he retirement in November 2013.

He was a delegate to the 16th National Congress of the Chinese Communist Party and a member of the Standing Committee of the 12th National Committee of the Chinese People's Political Consultative Conference.

== Downfall ==
On October 24, 2019, he has been placed under investigation for serious violations of laws and regulations, the Central Commission for Discipline Inspection (CCDI) said in a statement on its website, without elaborating.

On September 30, 2020, he was expelled from the Chinese Communist Party and removed from public office. He was under arrest on suspicion of taking bribes in the following month. In November, he has been indicted on suspicion of accepting bribes.

Yun's former boss Li Qingkui, a former Party Branch Secretary and chairman of China Southern Power Grid, one of China's largest regional grid operators, was placed on two-year probation within the Party (留党察看二年).

On October 9, 2022, he was sentenced to death with a two-year reprieve for accepting more than 468 million yuan ($70.2 million) in bribes by the Changchun Intermediate People's Court, and will face a life imprisonment without any possibility of commutation or parole after the two-year reprieve.

Government offices
Previous: Hu Zhi'an (呼治安)	Mayor of Yih Ju League; 1993-1995	Succeeded by Xing Yun
Party political offices
Preceded by Chen Qihou (陈启厚)	Communist Party Secretary of Yih Ju League; 1995-1996	Succeeded by Xing Yun
Preceded by Hou Wujie (侯伍杰)	Communist Party Secretary of Taiyuan; 2001-2006	Succeeded by Shen Weichen
Preceded by Shen Weichen	Director of Shanxi Provincial CCP Committee Publicity Department; 2000–2006	Succeeded by Gao Jianmin (高建民)
Business positions
Preceded by Cao Peixi (曹培玺)	General Manager of China Huadian Corporation; 2008-2013	Succeeded by Li Qingkui
