= Walk to Guangzhou =

Fundraising event in China

- Traditional Chinese: 行路上廣州
- Simplified Chinese: 行路上广州
- Literal meaning: Walk to Guangzhou
Transcriptions
Standard Mandarin
- Hanyu Pinyin: Xíng Lù Shàng Guǎng Zhōu
Yue: Cantonese
- Jyutping: Haang^{4} Lou^{6} Soeng^{6} Gwong^{2} Zau^{1}

Walk to Guangzhou (simplified Chinese: 行路上广州; traditional Chinese: 行路上廣州) is a fundraising campaign held each year for funding education for orphans and poor children in isolated areas of mainland China. The 30 km (18.64 mi) walk is between Hong Kong and Guangzhou and lasts four days with volunteers walking eight hours a day.

== History ==
Sowers Action, a non-profit organisation founded in 1992, and the Guangdong branch of the China Youth Development Foundation started the annual Walk to Guangzhou fundraising campaign in 1993 through Project Hope. The walk takes place during each Chinese New Year from Hong Kong to Guangzhou with the first event taking place in 1994. The event raises money to fund education for orphans and poor children in isolated areas of mainland China. During the 2005 walk, 330 volunteers began a four-day walk at Hong Kong's Kowloon Park. Their aim that year was to raise HK$5 million (US$642,894). Each day, they spend eight hours walking. The participants walk through Shenzhen, Futian District, Nanshan, Bao'an District, Chang'an, Humen Town, Guangzhou, Nansha Subdistrict, Panyu District, Huangpu to get to their destination, Guangzhou's Tianhe Stadium. According to China National Radio, the aim of the 30 km (18.64 mi) daily walk is to have the volunteers experience how determined the children who live in poverty-stricken mountains must be to attend school to learn. The children must walk up multiple hills daily when going to school.

By the 16th year, over 3800 people had participated, raising a total of HK$68,110,000 in charity donations. Since 2006 the Chinese government has gradually expanded the waiving of school-related fees in China's rural areas. In 2010 about 200 people joined in to raise funds for Yunnan, Sichuan, Gansu and Guizhou. By 2018, over 5,500 people had participated in the event, raising over HK$88 million (US$11,226,638).
