= Xishan Society =

Political alliance in Shanxi, China

The Xishan Society (simplified Chinese: 西山会; traditional Chinese: 西山會; pinyin: Xīshān Huì; lit. 'Western Hills Meeting') was an association consisting of prominent politicians from Shanxi province in China. The group was formed sometime around 2007, and was described as a "loose alliance" between officials and businesspeople, and allegedly operated somewhat like a secret society. The society is discussed at length in Datieji (打铁记 "Fighting Iron"), a book by journalist Luo Changping (罗昌平) about the investigation into former economic official Liu Tienan.

The group was said to have consisted of full and alternate members of the Central Committee of the Chinese Communist Party who had roots or were otherwise associated with Shanxi province, and select wealthy businesspeople. They were said to have met once every three months in the Western Hills of Beijing (hence Xishan). The name "Xishan" is also the characters of "Shanxi" in reverse order. Members are taken to the site of the meetings by luxury vehicles, and must surrender their mobile phones. Secretaries and romantic partners were not allowed at the meeting sites.

As the organization did not have a formal charter nor any known written records, there have been suggestions that the reports about the group have been exaggerated, or that it is a fairly routine gathering of friends with similar interests. Nevertheless, Datieji asserted that membership in the society was a sure "ticket to high office," and alleged that Liu Tienan had used the network to gain his promotions.

== Suggested members ==
The following people have been named in Chinese-language media reports but not independently verified.

- Ding Shumiao, born in Jincheng, Shanxi, multi-millionaire, businesswoman. Sentenced to 20 years in prison for her role in the Liu Zhijun corruption scandal, allegedly the original "bankroller" of the group.
- Liu Tienan, traces ancestry to Qi County, Shanxi, former Vice Chairman of the National Development and Reform Commission, former Director of the National Energy Administration; convicted on bribery charges, sentenced to life in prison.
- Ling Jihua, born in Pinglu County, Shanxi. Former Chief of the General Office of the Chinese Communist Party, top aide to Party general secretary Hu Jintao, held for investigation since December 2014, sentenced to life imprisonment in July 2016.
- Ling Zhengce, born in Pinglu County, Shanxi, Ling Jihua's older brother. Former Vice Chairman of the Shanxi Provincial Political Consultative Conference, former Director of the Shanxi Development and Reform Commission, held for investigation since June 2014, sentenced to 12 and a 1/2 years imprisonment in December 2016.
- Shen Weichen, born in Lucheng, Shanxi, former party chief of Taiyuan, former deputy head of the Central Propaganda Department of the Chinese Communist Party, held for investigation since August 2014, sentenced to life imprisonment in October 2016.
- Jin Daoming, from Beijing but spent much of his later career in Shanxi, former Vice Chairman of Shanxi Provincial People's Congress, former deputy provincial party chief, former Shanxi Discipline Inspection Secretary, held for investigation in February 2014
- Du Shanxue, born in Linyi County, Shanxi, former Vice Governor of Shanxi, held for investigation in June 2014
