= Jason Wang =

Jason Wang may refer to:

- Ling Wancheng (born c. 1960), Chinese businessperson
- Wang Shih-hsien (born 1968), Taiwanese singer and actor
