= Ling Jihua =

Chinese politician (born 1956)

- 令计划
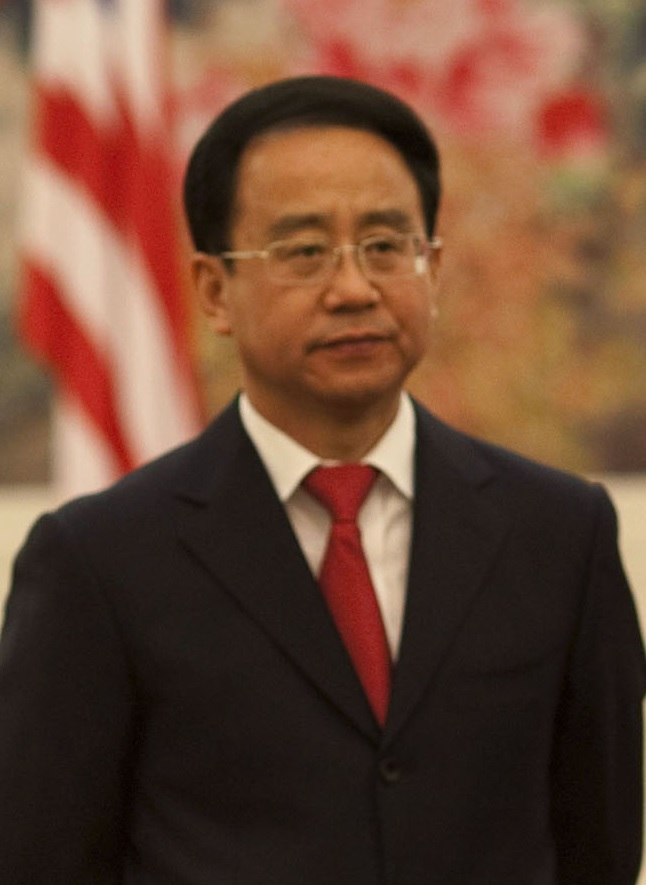
- Ling Jihua in 2009

Vice Chairman of the Chinese People's Political Consultative Conference
- In office 11 March 2013 – 20 January 2015
- Chairman: Yu Zhengsheng

Head of the United Front Work Department
- In office 1 September 2012 – 31 December 2014
- General secretary: Hu Jintao; Xi Jinping
- Preceded by: Du Qinglin
- Succeeded by: Sun Chunlan

Director of the General Office of the Chinese Communist Party
- In office 19 September 2007 – 31 August 2012
- General Secretary: Hu Jintao
- Preceded by: Wang Gang
- Succeeded by: Li Zhanshu

Personal details
- Born: Linghu Jihua (令狐计划); 22 October 1956 (age 69) Pinglu County, Shanxi Province
- Party: Chinese Communist Party (1976–2015, expelled)
- Spouse: Gu Liping
- Relations: Ling Zhengce (brother); Ling Wancheng (brother); Linghu Luxian (sister)
- Children: Ling Gu (son; d. 2012)
- Education: Hunan University

Chinese name
- Simplified Chinese: 令计划
- Traditional Chinese: 令計劃
Transcriptions
Standard Mandarin
- Hanyu Pinyin: Lìng Jìhuà

Linghu Jihua
- Simplified Chinese: 令狐计划
- Traditional Chinese: 令狐計劃
Transcriptions
Standard Mandarin
- Hanyu Pinyin: Línghú Jìhuà

Ling Jihua (Note: Chinese: 令计划; pinyin: Lìng Jìhuà) (born 22 October 1956) is a Chinese former politician and one of the principal political advisers of former leader Hu Jintao. Ling was best known for his tenure as director of the General Office of the Chinese Communist Party between 2007 and 2012. Ling was charged with corruption, bribery, and other misconduct and was sentenced to life imprisonment as part of a larger anti-corruption campaign carried out by Xi Jinping.

Ling began his career as a functionary in regional branches of the Communist Youth League in his native Shanxi Province. His Youth League involvement propelled him to the national-level organization in 1979. At the Youth League Ling worked in its Publicity Department and edited its flagship newspaper. Closely following the footsteps of his patron Hu Jintao, Ling was promoted to a leadership position in the General Office of the Chinese Communist Party in 1999, and became an important member of the State Commission for Public Sector Reform.

Ling rose to become the Director of the General Office, an organ that handles day-to-day logistics and bureaucratic functions of the Communist Party, in 2007, when Hu was the party's General Secretary (i.e., paramount leader). He was initially seen as a promising candidate for promotion to the top leadership at the 18th Party Congress in 2012. However, his political fortunes abruptly took a turn when his 23-year-old son was killed while driving a Ferrari in 2012, an event that caused embarrassment for the party elite. Ling was then politically sidelined.

In December 2014, Ling was placed under investigation by the Central Commission for Discipline Inspection (party's anti-graft agency) and removed from office. He was expelled from the Communist Party and tried on charges of corruption, illegal possession of state secrets, and abuse of power, and was sentenced to life imprisonment in July 2016.

== Career ==
=== Early career ===
Born Linghu Jihua, Ling was the third son to Linghu Ye (令狐野), a party official, in Pinglu County, Shanxi Province. He and all four of his siblings received names related to the Communist Party's policies. His own name, Jihua, means "planning". In December 1973, as with many other young Chinese, he was sent to work in the countryside as part of the Down to the Countryside Movement. Ling worked in a printing factory. "Linghu" is a very rare surname, eventually most members of the Ling family shortened the "Linghu" to "Ling".

In June 1975, Ling was admitted into the Communist Youth League (CYL) organization in Pinglu County, and was soon elevated to deputy secretary of the local CYL committee. He joined the Chinese Communist Party (CCP) in June 1976. In December 1978, Ling was transferred to CCP's Yuncheng Committee in Shanxi. In 1979, Communist Youth League's central organization selected young cadres nationwide to work in the capital. Ling, at the age of 23, was recruited to work in the Publicity Department of CYL Central Committee.

=== Rising through the ranks in Beijing ===
From August 1983, Ling studied at the Communist Youth League Academy (later China Youth University of Political Studies), majoring in political education. In July 1985, Ling worked in the political theory section of the Publicity Department of the Communist Youth League. At that time, Hu Jintao was the First Secretary (i.e., leader) of the Youth League, though it is not clear whether there was direct contact between Ling and Hu. From June 1988, Ling served in various posts in CYL, mostly as part of the CYL Secretariat and the CYL General Office. He also was editor-in-chief of Chinese Communist Youth League, the primary theory publication of the CYL, and between 1994 and 1995, and the CYL's chief of propaganda.

In December 1995, after having served in CYL for over ten years, Ling was transferred to General Office of the Chinese Communist Party, and continued his work in political theory. Between 1994 and 1996 Ling obtained an "on-job master's degree" in commercial management at Hunan University. In June 1998, he was promoted to head of research office of the General Office (中央办公厅调研室主任). In December 1999, Ling was appointed as deputy director of General Office. Later, he also was the deputy chief of the General Office in charge of the Central Institutional Organization Commission, and chief of staff of the Office of General Secretary Hu Jintao.

On 19 September 2007, Ling was promoted to become Director of General Office of the Chinese Communist Party, the nerve center of the party that was in charge of all manner of administrative activities of the party's central authorities, including communications and leaders' scheduling and agendas. He also became a Secretary of the Central Secretariat, in charge of the implementation of tasks set forth by the party's Politburo.

=== Son's Ferrari crash ===
Throughout Hu Jintao's leadership, Ling accompanied Hu on trips abroad and was often seen with Hu on inspection visits around the country. As one of Hu Jintao's closest associates and most trusted advisors, in addition to being of an appropriate level of seniority, Ling seemed to be a good candidate for higher office. Ling's political fortunes, however, took an abrupt turn in 2012. On March 18, Ling Jihua's only son, 23-year-old Ling Gu, was killed in a car crash on Beijing's 4th Ring Road while driving a black Ferrari 458 Spider accompanied by two women, reportedly of Tibetan ethnicity, one of whom died in the crash. Ling Gu was said to have been found naked, and the women were described as either naked or otherwise "scantily clad," which seemed to suggest sexual activity while driving. While this account was later disputed, the widely discussed "Ferrari crash" was sensationalized in the media and exacerbated the general public's cynicism over the debauchery and conspicuous consumption often associated with children of the Communist ruling elite.

News of the crash was reported in mainland Chinese media shortly after it happened, but the story was then rapidly suppressed. Reportedly, Ling Jihua, after viewing the body of the driver at the morgue, denied it was his son. Ling was also said to have mobilized staff from the Central Security Bureau, an organization in charge of national leaders' security which reported into the General Office, to cover up the crash. Chinese media also reported that Ling had contacted Zhou Yongkang, then chief of the powerful Central Political and Legal Affairs Commission, to reach unspecified "political deals" in exchange for assistance in covering up the death of his son. Ling then went on to work as normal. In China, Internet search terms such as "Ferrari", "Little Ling" and "Prince Ling" were blocked, and a message dispelling the rumour was also posted under Ling Gu's social media alias "Wang Ziyun". In November 2012, an 'exclusive' from the South China Morning Post reported that Jiang Jiemin, a former associate of Zhou Yongkang then chief executive of China National Petroleum Corporation, wired money from the company's accounts to the families of the two women involved in the crash to keep silent about the crash.

Despite media censorship regarding the event, news of the crash was widely circulated in China and later reported abroad by major international media, including the Wall Street Journal and Reuters. Online Chinese-language communities also questioned how Ling Gu could afford a car worth around $500,000 when his parents had government jobs. The crash and subsequent suppression of the incident by Ling were said to have been what ultimately led to his demotion in August 2012, and his wife Gu Liping's subsequent removal from her position in January 2013.

=== Demotion and investigation ===
On 1 September 2012, prior to the transfer of power between Hu Jintao and Xi Jinping at the pivotal 18th Party Congress, Ling was abruptly transferred from his position as General Office chief to become head of the United Front Work Department, an organ considered to be of less importance. Li Zhanshu, a close associate of Xi Jinping, replaced Ling's position as Director of General Office. This was seen as a demotion for Ling. At the 18th Party Congress held in the fall of 2012, Ling did not gain a seat on the Politburo as expected, nor did he retain his position as Secretary of the Secretariat; this signalled that Ling was excluded from all the major power organs of the party. In March 2013, Ling was elected as one of the vice-chairmen of the Chinese People's Political Consultative Conference (CPPCC), barely holding onto his status as a "national leader". In addition, of the 23 candidates standing for confirmation for the CPPCC Vice-Chairmanship, Ling received, by far, the fewest votes in favour. A total of 90 CPPCC delegates voted against Ling, while 22 delegates abstained.

In the latter half of 2014, members of the Ling family were successively detained by the authorities (see #Family section below). Moreover, an unprecedented number of high-ranking officials in Ling's native Shanxi province were investigated for corruption and removed from office. Rumours circulated about Ling's own fate. Ling was officially placed under investigation by the Central Commission for Discipline Inspection (party's anti-graft agency) on 22 December 2014, and dismissed from his position as United Front Work Department head about a week later. The CPPCC then removed him from the office of vice-chairman in February 2015, in addition to stripping him of his ordinary CPPCC delegate status.

Several weeks prior to the announcement of the investigation, Ling continued to make appearances on state television in his positions of CPPCC Vice Chairman and United Front chief. On 15 December Ling penned an article on the Communist theory publication Qiushi brimming with praise for the signature political philosophies of Xi Jinping such as the "Chinese Dream". This was seen by observers as a 'last-ditch' declaration of fealty to the new Chinese leader with whom Ling was thought to have lost favour.

Ling was one of the highest-profile targets (next to Zhou Yongkang and Xu Caihou) of the anti-corruption campaign following the 18th Party Congress spearheaded by Party General secretary Xi Jinping and central discipline chief Wang Qishan. He was the second sitting "national leader"-level figure to be investigated by the party's anti-graft agency, after CPPCC Vice-chairman Su Rong. Chinese-language media have linked Ling to a mysterious political network composed of prominent politicians and businesspeople with origins in Shanxi called the Xishan Society.

=== Detention and trial ===
On 20 July 2015, Ling was expelled from the Chinese Communist Party, and was arrested to face criminal proceedings. Ling's case received significant media attention, since he was the most prominent political figure expelled from the party since criminal proceedings were initiated against former Politburo Standing Committee member Zhou Yongkang. In the party's disciplinary dossier against Ling, he was accused of "violating political discipline, violating political rules, violating organizational discipline, and violating confidentiality discipline." He was further accused of taking in large bribes, aiding in the business interests of his wife, sexual misconduct with "numerous women", and illegally obtaining party and state secrets.

On 13 May 2016, the No. 1 branch of Tianjin Municipal People's Procuratorate filed suit against Ling on behalf of the state at the No. 1 Intermediate People's Court of Tianjin. On 4 July 2016, after a closed-door trial, Ling was sentenced to life imprisonment. He was convicted on charges of taking bribes, illegally obtaining state secrets and abuse of power. Upon hearing his sentence, Ling read aloud from a prepared script stating that he did not contest the conviction and "thanked" the court and the lawyers for their work, and used a Chinese idiom (kegu mingxin) to describe how unforgettable the trial had been to him.

The sentencing revealed many details which were previously unknown. The conviction stated that Ling had sought to use his influence to advance the interests of senior regional officials Li Chuncheng, Pan Yiyang, and Bai Enpei; all three had fallen under the axe of the anti-corruption campaign though their links to Ling were unclear prior to the conviction. It also stated that his wife, Gu Liping, and his son, Ling Gu, had taken bribes on behalf of the Ling family. Ling Gu was said to have solicited bribes worth some 6.5 million yuan (~$1 million) from Wei Xin, a senior executive of Founder Group. Ling and his wife, Gu Liping, additionally were said to have received some 15 million yuan (~$2.3 million) from Guangsha Group, in exchange for political favours from Ling. Following his departure from the General Office, it was said that Ling gained access to privileged state secrets through his former subordinate Huo Ke, who was also indicted and tried.

Ling was an alternate of 16th Central Committee of the Chinese Communist Party, a full member of 17th and 18th Central Committees, and a member of the 17th Central Secretariat. Ling was expelled from the 18th Central Committee at the Fifth Plenary Session in October 2015.

== Family ==
Ling is married to Gu Liping (谷丽萍), the former director-general of Youth Business China, a non-profit program that aims to promote youth entrepreneurship that is headquartered in Beijing. In 2010 she was deputy director of the Ying Public Interest Foundation, a charity sponsored by the Communist Youth League. In that role she reportedly solicited donations for the foundation. Gu was thought to be placed in custody prior to the initiation of the investigation on Ling Jihua.

Ling and Gu had one son, Ling Gu (令谷; born c. 1989), alias Wang Ziyun (王子云), who majored in international relations at Peking University. Ling Gu died in March 2012 at the age of 23 in the aforementioned Ferrari crash. According to Red Roulette by Desmond Shum, who claimed to have mentored Ling Gu at the request of Gu Liping, Ling Gu had organized a reading group with other princelings, modeled after Skull and Bones. Shum also wrote that Gu Liping was convinced her son was killed not in an accident, but as part of a conspiracy to eliminate Ling Jihua and the Youth League Faction.

Ling had three brothers and one sister. His eldest brother, Ling Fangzhen (令方针), was in the military, and died after a fall while cleaning windows in 1977. Ling's second eldest brother, Ling Zhengce, was a provincial-level politician in Shanxi Province until he was placed under investigation in June 2014. On December 16, 2016, the Intermediate People's Court of Changzhou, Jiangsu Province, found Ling Zhengce guilty of accepting bribes totaling over 16 million RMB in a first-instance trial and sentenced him to 12 1/2 years in prison. Ling's sister, Linghu Luxian (令狐路线), was a hospital executive in the city of Yuncheng, and was married to the city's Vice-Mayor Wang Jiankang (王健康); the couple disappeared from public view for several months in 2014, suspected of being placed under investigation, but re-appeared later on. Ling's younger brother, Ling Wancheng, was a businessman and golf enthusiast, who was reported to be under investigation in 2014, but disappeared in October of the same year. He and his wife fled to the United States in March 2015, reportedly with thousands of classified documents given to them by Ling Jihua.

== Notes ==
Party political offices
Preceded by Du Qinglin	Head of the United Front Work Department; 2012–2014	Succeeded by Sun Chunlan
Preceded by Wang Gang	Director of the General Office of the Chinese Communist Party; 2007–2012	Succeeded by Li Zhanshu
