= Ling Wancheng =

Chinese businessman

- 令完成
- Born: c. 1960; Pinglu County, Shanxi, China
- Other names: Wang Cheng (王诚), Jason Wang
- Education: Jilin University
- Occupation: Businessman
- Years active: 1983 - 2014
- Relatives: Ling Jihua (brother); Ling Zhengce (brother)

Ling Wancheng (Chinese: 令完成; born c. 1960), also known as Wang Cheng (王诚) and Jason Wang, is a Chinese businessman who once held investments in the communications and entertainment industries.

He left for the United States shortly after his brothers Ling Jihua and Ling Zhengce, who are prominent politicians, were placed under investigation as part of the anti-corruption campaign under Xi Jinping, the general secretary of the Chinese Communist Party.

== Early life and education ==
Ling Wancheng was born in Pinglu County, Shanxi, China. Ling is a member of the prominent Ling political family from Shanxi province. He is the youngest of five siblings. All of his siblings were named after Mao-era Chinese Communist Party (CCP) terminology. His own name 完成 means "to complete". His elder brothers Ling Jihua and Ling Zhengce are both politicians.

Ling Wancheng was graduated with a degree in economics from Jilin University. He earned an MBA from Hunan University in 2004.

== Career ==
After graduation Ling joined the Xinhua news agency. He compiled internal documentation for CCP officials and worked as a news reporter. He was an editor at Outlook Weekly (瞭望) magazine. He rose to become the deputy chief of the General Office of the Xinhua news agency.

In 2004 he became the CEO of Tiantian Zaixian (天天在线), a subsidiary of China Netcom. Ling, along with associates from his home province of Shanxi, co-founded an investment firm in 2008, and became chief executive of its subsidiary Huijin Lifang Capital Management Ltd. shortly thereafter. Huijin owned a stake in the Chinese online entertainment company LeTV.com. Under Ling's leadership the company was thought to have profited some 300 million yuan ($48.27 million) from the appreciation of LeTV stocks.

== Personal life ==
A golf enthusiast, Ling has won many amateur golf tournaments in Beijing under the pseudonym "Wang Cheng", and was a member of the China Golf Association.

In November 2014, Ling was placed under investigation by the Chinese government.

== Investigation ==
Two of Ling's brothers, Ling Zhengce and Ling Jihua, were placed under investigation in 2014. However Ling left for the United States after his brother's investigation had been initiated. The New York Times reported that Ling purchased a home from NBA player Beno Udrih in Loomis, California, and had resided there with his wife for a period of time and befriended their neighbors, but disappeared in October 2014. Ling's subsequent whereabouts were unknown.

In August 2015 the Obama administration expressed concerns about undercover Chinese law enforcement operatives with the Chinese Ministry of Public Security in the United States who were searching for and repatriating Chinese fugitives under Operation Fox Hunt. According to The New York Times, "should he seek political asylum, he could become one of the most damaging defectors in the history of the People's Republic."
