= China Youth Development Foundation =

Chinese non-governmental organization

The China Youth Development Foundation or China Youth Development Fund (CYDF) is a national non-profit and non-governmental organization founded in March 1989 in Beijing. The CYDF works to develop Chinese youth through education, science and technology, culture, physical education, health, and environmental protection. The CYDF is best known for launching and managing its largest program to date, "Project Hope." Project Hope has sought to help school dropouts in poor remote regions return to school and complete at least an elementary education.

== Structure ==
The CYDF's parent organization is the Communist Youth League.

== Non-profit sector in China ==
The non-profit or "third" sector in China developed during a period of reform and opening-up. An open, dynamic market economy was gradually replacing a closed, centrally planned economy, resulting in widespread social change and breakdowns in the welfare system. No longer able to rely on the government to ensure job security and social benefits, people became increasingly self-sufficient and more independent. The rejuvenation in Chinese society created an unprecedented friendly environment for the development of China's previously insignificant non-profit sector. As one of the earliest non-profit organizations to be established, the CYDF has seen remarkable success.

Their success as a non-profit has prompted the CYDF to aid the development of other non-profit organizations in China by organizing and promoting international exchanges and cooperation. The CYDF hosted a conference to examine the development of non-profit organizations in China and the lessons that might be learned from Project Hope in that development. The CYDF is currently undertaking China's first-ever "grant making" program in the area of education with the help of funds provided by international organizations. The CYDF's attempts to "professionalize" its own senior staff as well as other senior non-profit managers in China through the establishment of formal training programs at the People's University and at the Chinese University in Hong Kong.

== Programs ==
=== Project Hope ===
Project Hope is the flagship program of CYDF. Founded in 1989, the goal of the project is to improve primary school education in China's poorest regions. As of 2021, Project Hope has raised approximately 20 billion RMB in donations, supported more than 6 million students with financial aid, and built more than 20,000 primary schools.

In addition, the foundation has set up a "Stars of Hope Award Fund" to support top-ranked Project Hope students in further studies and a "Hope Primary School Teacher-Training Fund" to allow teachers to sharpen their skills.

=== Mother River Protection Project ===
This project was created to help improve the ecological environment of China. Launched in 1999, the "Mother River Protection Project" aims to plant large numbers of trees near sources of the Yangtze River and the Yellow River and eventually in other environmentally threatened areas throughout the country. The Project has raised donations of RMB 300 million and has undertaken 1,196 programs across China, planted 412,000 hectares of trees, and organized over 300 million youth volunteers to participate in planting trees and other environmental protection activities.

=== Action Red Ribbon ===
Launched in 2003, "Action Red Ribbon" attempts to increase HIV/AIDS awareness among Chinese youth to support the education of children in AIDS-affected areas. The program aims to construct 100 "Red Ribbon Clubs of Care" in areas of China, selected by the Chinese Ministry of Health. These clubs will educate rural populations, especially youth, on AIDS prevention. The goal is to increase awareness in these 100 areas to 70%.

=== Chinese Ancient Poem Recital Program ===
The "Chinese Ancient Poem Recital Project" is intended to foster an appreciation for China's traditional culture among youth. Over 4 million participants from different regions and provinces around China have participated in the program.

=== Prospect Plan ===
Initiated in 1993, along with the China Association for International Exchange of Personnel, this project aims to empower underprivileged people in economically backward regions and promote development of the society by capacity building and pursuit of excellence.

=== Western China Talent Project ===
Initiated in 2000, the Project has so far trained more than 8,000 talents for the development of western China through public demonstration with government's support, promotion from civil organizations and participation of the general public.

=== New Countryside Prospect Plan ===
To promote capacity building of the talented people in rural western China, the New Countryside Prospect Plan aims to support the poor and help the talented by empowering them through demonstration to make millions of people in rural areas turn wealthy.

=== Rural Leader Capacity Building Program ===
This program aims to improve the capacity building of those in rural western China talented in business management, entrepreneurship, and leadership through training and support. The leaders are expected reach out and with their expertise in business development, benefit people in the neighborhood to achieve the ultimate goal of a socialist harmonious society.

=== Happy Rural Family Hotel Program ===
The goal of this program is to help young people of rural areas in western China engage in tourism service and set up and run family hotels with rural features to alleviate poverty.

== Award Programs ==
Another activity of the CYDF is the presentation of awards and prizes that encourage Chinese youth to develop their talents. Since 1990 the CYDF has cooperated with the All-China Youth Federation and ten media groups including CCTV, in selecting "Ten Outstanding Chinese Youths" each year. The award goes to outstanding young people who have made great contributions and have made prominent achievements in the country's development. CYDF is also involved in the selection of "Young Chinese Scientists Winners."

The CYDF has established, together with the United Nations Development Programme, an annual International Youth Prize for Poverty Elimination. This award was created in 1996 to enhance the development of young people in poverty-stricken areas and strengthen the determination to eliminate poverty. The award recognizes young people under the age of 25 who have made great contributions to underdeveloped areas.

The CYDF also recognizes excellent teachers who have been working for a long time for rural primary education and have made outstanding achievements in the implementation of Project Hope in poverty-stricken areas. This award is called "Project Hope Gardener".

== Partners ==
=== Procter & Gamble ===
As an internationally renowned corporation, Procter & Gamble has a long-standing partnership with CYDF. From 1996 to 2005, P&G donated more than RMB 240 million in total, and built 100 Project Hope primary schools in 27 provinces, a record among multi-national companies. In 2005, P&G adopted the theme "Caring for Children, Delight from the Heart" and donated RMB 1.5 million. It continued to promote the "Loving 1+1" campaign, built 11 primary schools and supported 600 students from poor rural families. At the Hainan Qiong Shan P& G Hope Primary School, the company launched the "Loving, Caring, Understanding – Volunteer Child Psychologist visit to a Project Hope School" to provide continuing service for children there.

In 2002 P&G launched a new project entitled "The Double Hundred Hope School Project" to build another 100 schools with partners before 2010.

=== Motorola ===
Since 1995, Motorola has contributed consistently to CYDF, giving more than RMB 33 million. It has supported various programs and activities including providing support to get children back in school, building schools, supporting teacher training, providing scholarships for outstanding students, building libraries and computer labs, and providing sponsorship for the children of migrant workers in cities.

Motorola has placed its focus on direct participation; site visits and long term follow up for projects. It organizes senior leadership, outstanding staff and volunteers for annual visits to program beneficiaries. These visits have enabled those involved to obtain first hand experience of the impact made on rural areas.

=== General Electric ===
The GE Foundation made a three-year grant of US$800,000 to CYDF in 2005 to train a large number of Project Hope school principals and teachers in 10 counties in Inner Mongolia, Sichuan, Jiangxi, Yunnan, and Guangxi. By the end of 2005, CYDF had organized ten GE-Project Hope training sessions and field-based training for about 4,800 school principals and teachers. About 40 volunteers from GE participated in the trainings.

=== Jeanswest ===
In July 2005, Jeanswest International (HK) Co. Ltd. Donated RMB 9 million to CYDF to create the "Jeanswest College Financial Aid Fund" to support more than 2,000 talented college students facing financial difficulties.

=== China Basketball Association ===
In April 2005, CYDF and the China Basketball Association (CBA) launched the "Growing Up with the CBA Charity Program" and "ANTA Love Action" to promote sports development for young people in underprivileged regions in West China. This charity program will take advantage of the CBA Season to set up the charity fund by hosting a series of activities designed to collect donations to build CBA Hope Schools and Hope basketball courts and encourage Hope Schools to offer sports activities. The China Basketball Association donated RMB 1.31 million in start-up funds for the program. ANTA (China) Co. Ltd, the major sponsor of the CBA season, donated RMB 1 million in cash and RMB 2 million in in-kind donations to the program. ANTA has committed RMB 1 from the proceeds of the sale of each and every pair of basketball shoes to the program through the end of 2007.

== See also ==
- List of charities in China
- Walk to Guangzhou
- Youth Business China
