= Geng Yanbo =

Chinese politician

- 耿彦波

Mayor of Taiyuan
- In office April 2013 – 15 January 2019
- Leader: Wu Zhenglong→Wang Weizhong→Luo Qingyu (party chief)
- Preceded by: Lian Yimin
- Succeeded by: Li Xiaobo

Mayor of Datong
- In office July 2008 – February 2013
- Leader: Feng Lixiang (party chief)
- Preceded by: Feng Lixiang
- Succeeded by: Li Junming

Communist Party Secretary of Yuci District
- In office March 2000 – February 2004
- Preceded by: Wang Xinyi
- Succeeded by: Wang Jianlin

Magistrate of Lingshi County
- In office March 1995 – March 2000

Personal details
- Born: November 1958 (age 67) Heshun County, Shanxi, China
- Party: Chinese Communist Party
- Education: Shanxi University; Central Party School of the Chinese Communist Party; Northwest University; Cheung Kong Graduate School of Business

Chinese name
- Traditional Chinese: 耿彥波
- Simplified Chinese: 耿彦波
Transcriptions
Standard Mandarin
- Hanyu Pinyin: Gěng Yànbō

Geng Yanbo (Chinese: 耿彦波; born November 1958) is a Chinese politician from Heshun, Shanxi, who served as the mayor of Datong from 2008 to 2013 and the mayor of Taiyuan from 2013 to 2019.

== Biography ==
Geng was born in Heshun County, Shanxi, in November 1958. He entered the workforce in August 1976, and joined the Chinese Communist Party in December 1981. In July 1983 he was accepted to Shanxi University, majoring in Chinese language and literary. He also studied at Northwest University, Cheung Kong Graduate School of Business and Central Party School of the Chinese Communist Party as a part-time student.

In April 1993 he was promoted to become deputy party chief of Lingshi County, a position he held until March 2000. He became party chief of Yuci District in March 2000, and served until February 2004. He was deputy secretary-general of Shanxi Provincial Government in February 2004, and held that office until June 2006. He served as vice-mayor of Taiyuan in June 2006, but having held the position for only a year and a half, when he was transferred to Datong and appointed deputy party chief and vice-mayor. During his term in office, he was known as "Demolition Geng" after he became mayor in 2008. Geng earned his name from his campaign to demolish much of the city center, relocating 40,000 of its 140,000 households, before rebuilding it in an ancient style, with a view to attracting tourists. In February 2013 he became vice-mayor of Taiyuan, rising to mayor two months later.

On January 15, 2019, Geng resigned as Mayor of Taiyuan, having reached the unofficial retirement age for male officials. Geng was appointed as a counselor of the Shanxi Provincial Government in June 2019, and served as acting president of the Shanxi Provincial Celebrity Federation social club in 2024.

The documentary film The Chinese Mayor covers Geng Yanbo's tenure as mayor of Datong city and his efforts to redevelop the city. It addresses issues including urbanization, hukou, and local government debt.

Party political offices
Preceded by Wang Xinyi (王新义)	Communist Party Secretary of Yuci District; 2000-2004	Succeeded by Wang Jianlin (王建林)
Government offices
Preceded by Feng Lixiang	Mayor of Datong; 2008-2013	Succeeded by Li Junming (李俊明)
Preceded by Lian Yimin (廉毅敏)	Mayor of Taiyuan; 2013-2019	Succeeded by Li Xiaobo (李晓波)
