= Politics of Taiyuan =

The politics of Taiyuan in Shanxi province in the People's Republic of China is structured in a dual party-government system like all other governing institutions in mainland China.

The Mayor of Taiyuan is the highest-ranking official in the People's Government of Taiyuan or Taiyuan Municipal Government. However, in the city's dual party-government governing system, the Mayor has less power than the Taiyuan Municipal Chinese Communist Party Committee Secretary, colloquially termed the "CCP Party Chief of Taiyuan" or "Communist Party Secretary of Taiyuan". The Taiyuan Municipal People's Congress is the highest legislative body in the city and is responsible for making and amending local laws and regulations. The Taiyuan Municipal People's Government, on the other hand, is the executive body responsible for implementing the decisions and policies of the People's Congress and overseeing the day-to-day administration of the city.

== History ==
On April 12, 2014, Shen Weichen was being investigated by the Central Commission for Discipline Inspection (CCDI) for "serious violations of laws and regulations".

On August 23, 2014, Chen Chuanping was being investigated by the CCDI for "serious violations of laws and regulations".

== List of mayors of Taiyuan ==
No.	English name	Chinese name	Took office	Left office	Notes
1	Han Chunde	韩纯德	October 1949	December 1952	
2	Wang Daren	王大任	December 1952	January 1955	
3	Yue Weifan	岳维藩	January 1955	February 1957	
4	Liu Shihong	刘世洪	1958	1978	
5	Yue Weifan	岳维藩	1978	1982	
6	Wang Maolin	王茂林	September 1982	April 1985	
7	Yang Chongchun	杨崇春	April 1985	March 1988	
8	Wan Liangshi	万良适	February 1988	April 1991	
9	Meng Lizheng	孟立正	March 1991	March 1993	
10	Zhang Zeyu	张泽宇	January 1993	March 1995	
11	Cao Zhonghou	曹中厚	March 1995	March 2000	
12	Li Ronghuai	李荣怀	March 2000	February 2006	
13	Zhang Bingsheng	张兵生	February 2006	April 2006	Acting
14	Zhang Bingsheng	张兵生	April 2006	February 2011	
15	Lian Yimin	廉毅敏	February 2011	March 2011	Acting
16	Lian Yimin	廉毅敏	March 2011	February 2013	
17	Geng Yanbo	耿彦波	February 2013	April 2013	Acting
18	Geng Yanbo	耿彦波	April 2013	15 January 2019	
19	Li Xiaobo	李晓波	15 January 2019		

== List of CCP Party secretaries of Taiyuan ==
No.	English name	Chinese name	Took office	Left office	Notes
1	Zhao Lin	赵林	April 1937	October 1937	
2	Han Chunde	韩纯德	June 1949	December 1952	
3	Wang Daren	王大任	December 1952	December 1954	
4	Wang Daren	王大任	December 1954	June 1955	
5	Chi Biqing	池必卿	June 1955	December 1957	
6	Li Qi	李琦	December 1957	December 1960	
7	Ma Guishu	麻贵书	December 1960	May 1964	
8	Yuan Zhen	袁振	May 1964	January 1967	Overthrown during Cultural Revolution
9	Liu Shihong	刘世洪	February 1967	April 1971	
10	Liu Shihong	刘世洪	April 1971	May 1973	
11	Ma Jie	马杰	May 1973	March 1975	Acting
12	Huang Zhigang	黄志刚	March 1975	January 1977	
13	Wang Xiujin	王绣锦	November 1977	September 1982	
14	Li Xiuren	李修仁	September 1982	March 1983	
15	Wang Jiangong	王建功	April 1983	April 1985	
16	Wang Maolin	王茂林	April 1985	June 1987	Later party chief of Hubei
17	Sun Ying	孙英	October 1987	April 1992	
18	Wang Yunlong	王云龙	April 1992	February 1996	
19	Ji Xinfang	纪馨芳	February 1996	January 2000	
20	Hou Wujie	侯伍杰	January 2000	September 2001	Convicted of corruption, imprisoned until 2013
21	Yun Gongmin	云公民	September 2001	January 2006	Under investigation for corruption
22	Shen Weichen	申维辰	January 2006	September 2010	Convicted of corruption, jailed
23	Chen Chuanping	陈川平	September 2010	August 2014	Convicted of corruption, jailed
24	Wu Zhenglong	吴政隆	September 2014	November 2016	Later Governor of Jiangsu
25	Wang Weizhong	王伟中	November 2016	March 2017	
26	Luo Qingyu	罗清宇	March 2017	incumbent	
