= Huo Ke =

Chinese political operative (born 1961)

- 霍克
- Born: August 1961 (age 64–65); Yi County, Hebei, China
- Education: PLA Nanjing Political College
- Occupation: Political operative
- Political party: Chinese Communist Party (1983–2015; expelled)

Huo Ke (Chinese: 霍克; pinyin: Huò Kè; born August 1961) is a former Chinese political operative who served as an aide to senior official Ling Jihua. He was investigated by the Chinese Communist Party's anti-graft agency in January 2015, and later indicted on charges of taking and giving bribes and leaking state secrets.

== Life and career ==
Huo was born and raised in Yi County, Hebei. He graduated from People's Liberation Army Nanjing Political College. He began his political career in December 1976, and joined the Chinese Communist Party in June 1983. He served in various posts in Beijing Military Region before serving as head of the Secretary Office of the General Office of the Chinese Communist Party, working under Ling Jihua.

On December 16, 2014, as his former boss Ling Jihua fell under the axe of the anti-corruption campaign, Huo was abruptly appointed deputy director of the China National Tourism Administration, and essentially meaningless position likely contrived to rid the General Office of Ling associates and pave way for a wider investigation into Ling's inner circle. Huo remained in that position for barely a month, until January 2015, when state media announced that he would be investigated for suspected "serious discipline and law violations".

On August 11, 2015, Huo was expelled from the Communist Party at the conclusion of the party's internal investigation. He was said to have given bribes to his superiors in order to get promoted. He was also indicted on criminal charges of taking and giving bribes and "intentionally leaking state secrets."

Huo was a delegate to the 18th National Congress of the Chinese Communist Party.
