= The Chinese Mayor =

- Promotional poster
- Directed by: Zhou Hao
- Written by: Zhou Hao, Zhao Qi
- Produced by: Zhao Qi
- Starring: Geng Yanbo
- Cinematography: Zhou Hao, Zhang Tianhui
- Edited by: Yu Xiaochuan, Tom Lin
- Release date: January 28, 2015 (Sundance)
- Running time: 86 minutes
- Country: People's Republic of China
- Languages: Chinese (Mandarin), with English subtitles

The Chinese Mayor (Chinese: 中国市长), original title Datong (大同), is a 2015 documentary that follows Datong mayor Geng Yanbo's efforts to transform one of China's most polluted cities into a cultural destination, in large part by displacing 500,000 residents (about 200,000 homes demolished) to reconstruct the 14th century Ming Dynasty walls of the Old City. The documentary addresses issues including urbanization processes, hukou, and local government debt.

== Premiere ==
The film's American premiere occurred at the Sundance Festival, where it was awarded a "Special Jury Award for Unparalleled Access"

== Accolades ==
Date of ceremony	Award	Category	Recipient(s)	Result
2015	Sundance Film Festival	Special Jury Prize – Documentary	Zhou Hao	Won
2015	Sundance Film Festival	Grand Jury Prize – Documentary	Zhou Hao	Nominated
2015	Asia Pacific Screen Awards	Best Documentary Feature Film	Zhao Qi	Won
2015	Golden Horse Film Festival	Best Documentary		Won
2015	Little Rock Film Festival	Jury Prize – Cinematic Non-fiction	Zhou Hao	Nominated
2015	RiverRun International Film Festival	Best Documentary Feature	Zhou Hao	Won

== Reviews ==
The film received favorable reviews, but as of the summer of 2015 the film was still seeking an American distribution partner. In the US, the film can be rented on YouTube. On 10 February 2019, BBC World News televised the documentary.
