= Melanie Manion =

American political scientist

- Other name: 墨宁
- Citizenship: American
- Education: McGill University (BA), SOAS University of London (MA), University of Michigan (PhD)
- Occupation: Political scientist
- Employer: Duke University

Melanie Manion is an American political scientist. She is currently the Vor Broker Family Distinguished Professor at Duke University.

Manion’s research focuses on authoritarian governance, with empirical work on bureaucracy, corruption, information and political representation in China. She is fluent in Mandarin Chinese.

== Education ==
Manion holds a BA in East Asian studies from McGill University, a MA in Far Eastern studies from the School of Oriental and African Studies, University of London, and a PhD in political science (1989) from the University of Michigan. She also studied political economy and philosophy at Peking University (1978-1980).

== Academic career ==
Prior to joining Duke in 2015, Manion was a Vilas-Jordan Distinguished Achievement professor of political science at the University of Wisconsin–Madison. She served on the political science faculty of the University of Rochester from 1989 to 2000.

== Publications ==
=== Articles ===
- Authoritarian Parochialism: Local Congressional Representation in China, China Quarterly, June 17, 2014
- When Communist Party Candidates Can Lose, Who Wins? Assessing the Role of Local People's Congresses in the Selection of Leaders in China, China Quarterly, September 22, 2008
- The Cadre Management System, Post-Mao: The Appointment, Promotion, Transfer and Removal of Party and State Leaders.” China Quarterly, no. 102: 203–233, 1985
- “Reluctant Duelists: The Logic of the 1989 Protests and Massacre.” In Beijing Spring, 1989: Confrontation and Conflict. The Basic Documents, ed. Michel Oksenberg, Lawrence R. Sullivan, and Marc Lambert, xiii–xlii. Armonk, N.Y.: M. E. Sharpe., 1990
- Retirement of Revolutionaries in China: Public Policies, Social Norms, Private Interests. Princeton, N.J.: Princeton University Press, 1993
- Survey Research in the Study of Contemporary China: Learning from Local Samples. China Quarterly, no. 139: 741–765. 1994
- Corruption by Design: Bribery in Chinese Enterprise Licensing. Journal of Law, Economics, and Organization, 12, no. 1: 167–195. 1996
- Issues in Corruption Control in Post-Mao China. Issues and Studies, 34, no. 9: 1–21. 1998
