= Project Hope =

Chinese public service project

Project Hope (希望工程; Xīwàng gōngchéng) is a Chinese public service project organized by the China Youth Development Foundation (CYDF) and the Communist Youth League (CYL) Central Committee. Started in 1989, it aims to bring schools into poverty-stricken rural areas of China, to help children whose families are too poor to afford complete elementary school education. Through Project Hope, the CYDF has also sought to improve educational facilities and improve teaching quality in poorer regions.

== Achievements ==
As of 2021, Project Hope has raised approximately 20 billion RMB in donations, supported more than 6 million students with financial aid, and built more than 20,000 primary schools.

Some 80 percent of the Hope Project primary schools and students aided by the project are located in China's middle and western regions, which are less developed.

== Influences ==
According to a report by National Research Center for Science and Technology for Development, 93.9 percent of residents in 29 provincial capital cities aged above 16 have heard of Project Hope, and 63.5 percent have contributed to it in various ways. The report drew the conclusion that Project Hope has become the largest and most influential non-governmental welfare project in China.

== Tobacco sponsorship controversy ==
In 2011 The Daily Telegraph reported that Project Hope accepts sponsorship from China Tobacco and allows schools to be named after cigarette brands, carry prominent pro-tobacco advertising, vend cigarette-shaped candy and sell individually-wrapped cigarettes outside school gates, in an attempt to create new smoking addicts to replace those dying of smoking-related diseases, without parents being aware of the dangers.
