= Liu Zhigeng =

Chinese politician (born 1956)

Liu Zhigeng 刘志庚

Vice-Governor of Guangdong
- In office November 2011 – February 2016

Communist Party Secretary of Dongguan
- In office March 2006 – November 2011
- Preceded by: Dong Xing
- Succeeded by: Xu Jianhua

Personal details
- Born: June 1956 (age 70) Xingning, Guangdong
- Party: Chinese Communist Party (expelled)
- Education: Jilin University
- Occupation: Politician

Liu Zhigeng (Chinese: 刘志庚; pinyin: Liú Zhìgēng; born June 1956) is a former Chinese politician. He was the Vice-Governor of Guangdong and the Chinese Communist Party Committee Secretary of Dongguan. On February 4, 2016, Liu was placed under investigation by the Central Commission for Discipline Inspection. On April 18, 2016, Liu Zhigeng was double opened and transferred to the judiciary.

== Career ==
Liu Zhigeng was born in Xingning, Guangdong in June 1956. He was the teacher of Pei Ning commune Primary School (陂宁公社) from 1973 to 1978. In 1979, he entered Jilin University and graduated in 1983. He joined the Chinese Communist Party (CCP) in February 1985. From 1983 to 1992, Liu Zhigeng worked in Shenzhen Municipal Planning Bureau. In 1993 he became the mayor of Longgang District and the CCP Committee Secretary of Longgang District in 1995. In 2002, Liu became the mayor of Qingyuan. Liu Zhigeng held power in Dongguan from 2004 to 2011, which served as CCP Deputy Secretary, Mayor, Director of People's Congress, and CCP Secretary. In 2011, Liu Zhigeng became the Vice-Governor of Guangdong.

On February 4, 2016, Liu Zhigeng was placed under investigation by the Central Commission for Discipline Inspection, the CCP's internal disciplinary body, for "serious violations of regulations". Liu was expelled from the CCP on April 18, 2016, for "joining superstitious activities, membership in private clubs and bribery".

On February 24, 2017, the Nanning Railway Transportation Intermediate Court heard the case of Liu Zhigeng's bribery in the first instance, and found that he had accepted bribes equivalent to 98.17 million yuan, and the court decided to pronounce a sentence at an optional date. On May 31 of the same year, the Nanning Railway Transportation Intermediate People's Court publicly pronounced the verdict in the first instance, and sentenced Liu Zhigeng to life imprisonment for accepting bribes, deprived of political rights for life, and confiscated all personal property; property obtained from accepting bribes was recovered and turned over to the state treasury. Liu Zhigeng said in court that he accepted the sentence and would not appeal.

On May 31, 2017, Liu was sentenced to life in prison for taking bribes worth 98.17 million yuan in Nanning.
