= Li Qingkui =

Chinese politician

- 李庆奎

Chairman of China Southern Power Grid
- In office June 2016 – August 2018
- Preceded by: Zhao Jianguo
- Succeeded by: Meng Zhenping

Chairman of China Huadian Corporation
- In office November 2013 – June 2016

Personal details
- Born: March 1956 (age 70) Dingtao County, Shandong, China
- Party: Chinese Communist Party
- Education: North China Electric Power University

Chinese name
- Traditional Chinese: 李慶奎
- Simplified Chinese: 李庆奎
Transcriptions
Standard Mandarin
- Hanyu Pinyin: Lǐ Qìngkuí

Li Qingkui (Chinese: 李庆奎; born March 1956) is a former Chinese business executive who served as Chinese Communist Party Committee Secretary and chairman of China Southern Power Grid, one of China's largest regional grid operators, from June 2016 to his retirement in August 2018. He was investigated by the Central Commission for Discipline Inspection (CCDI), the Chinese Communist Party's internal disciplinary body, and the National Supervisory Commission, the highest anti-corruption agency of China, in October 2019.

== Career ==
Li was born in Dingtao County, Shandong, in March 1956. He graduated from North China Electric Power University.

He had spent most of his political career in Heze, Shandong before serving in state-owned enterprises. In November 2007 he was promoted to become deputy general manager of China Guodian Corporation, one of the five largest power producers in China, but having held the position for only half a year, when he was appointed deputy general manager of China Huadian Corporation, one of China's largest power companies, between June 2008 and November 2013. Then he was promoted again to become its Chinese Communist Party Committee Secretary and chairman. He became the CCP Committee Secretary and chairman of China Southern Power Grid, one of China's largest regional grid operators, in June 2016, and served until he retirement in August 2018.

== Investigation ==
In October 2019, he was put under investigation for alleged "serious violations of discipline and laws". The Central Commission for Discipline Inspection and the National Supervisory Commission said in a statement that an investigation of his case found that he lost control and education to his family members, violated the eight-point frugality code on CCP and government conduct by visiting private clubs, occupied public cars for private use for a long time, and used office space beyond the standard; promoted and adjusted cadres in violation of regulations; used power for personal gain, and accepted other people's property by himself and through his family members. He was placed on two-year probation within the CCP (留党察看二年).

Business positions
Preceded by Zhao Jianguo (赵建国)	Chairman of China Southern Power Grid; 2008–2013	Succeeded by Meng Zhenping (孟振平)
