= Shen Peiping =

Chinese politician

- 沈培平

Vice-Governor of Yunnan
- In office January 2013 – March 2014
- Governor: Li Jiheng

Communist Party Secretary of Pu'er
- In office December 2009 – January 2013
- Preceded by: Gao Shusheng
- Succeeded by: Wei Xing

Mayor of Pu'er
- In office April 2007 – December 2009
- Preceded by: Mao Wen'guo
- Succeeded by: Li Xiaoping

Personal details
- Born: February 1962 (age 64) Shidian County, Yunnan, China
- Party: Chinese Communist Party (1985–2014; expelled)
- Education: Baoshan University; Central Party School of the Chinese Communist Party; Beijing Normal University

Shen Peiping (Chinese: 沈培平; pinyin: Shěn Péipíng; born February 1962) is a former Chinese politician from Yunnan province. Between 2013 and 2014 Shen served as the Vice Governor of Yunnan province. He also once served as the Mayor and then Party Secretary of Pu'er. He was investigated in March 2014 by the Communist Party's internal disciplinary organ.

== Career ==
Shen was born in Shidian County, Yunnan in February 1962. Shen entered Baoshan University in September 1979, majoring in Chinese language, where he graduated in August 1981.

After the reform and opening up, Shen became involved in politics in August 1981 and joined the Chinese Communist Party in April 1985.

In August 1981, Shen worked as a teacher in Shidian Meddle School until July 1989.

In July 1989, he worked in People's Government office of Shidian County as an officer, until October 1996.

In January 1998 he was promoted to become party chief of Tengchong County (now Tengchong), a position he held until January 2003.

Shen served as the deputy secretary general of People's Government of Yunnan Province between January 2003 to November 2004.

In November 2004, he was appointed the deputy party chief of Simao and mayor of Simao, he remained in that position until April 2007, when he was transferred to Pu'er and appointed the deputy party chief and mayor of Pu'er. Shen was elevated to the party chief of Pu'er in December 2009.

In January 2013, Shen was promoted to become the vice-governor of Yunnan.

== Downfall ==
On March 9, 2014, Shen was being investigated by the Central Commission for Discipline Inspection for "serious violations of laws and regulations". Shen was expelled from the Chinese Communist Party in August 2014, his case was then moved to judicial authorities for criminal proceedings. On December 3, 2015, Shen Peiping was sentenced 12 years in jail for taking bribes worth 16.15 million yuan (~$2.5 million) by the First Intermediate People's Court in Beijing.

Government offices
Preceded by Mao Wen'guo	Mayor of Pu'er; 2004–2009	Succeeded by Li Xiaoping
Party political offices
Preceded by Gao Xusheng	Communist Party Secretary of Pu'er; 2009–2013	Succeeded by Wei Xing
