= Shen Weichen =

Chinese politician

- 申维辰

Communist Party Group Secretary of China Association for Science and Technology
- In office April 2013 – April 2014
- President: Han Qide
- Concurrent post: Executive Vice Chairman
- Preceded by: Chen Xi
- Succeeded by: Shang Yong

Deputy Head of the Central Publicity Department of the Chinese Communist Party
- In office September 2010 – April 2013
- Head: Liu Yunshan

Communist Party Secretary of Taiyuan
- In office January 2006 – September 2010
- Preceded by: Yun Gongmin
- Succeeded by: Chen Chuanping

Director of the Shanxi Provincial Publicity Department of the Chinese Communist Party
- In office September 2000 – January 2006
- Preceded by: Hou Wujie
- Succeeded by: Yun Gongmin

Communist Party Secretary of Jinzhong
- In office May 2000 – September 2000
- Preceded by: Fan Duixiang
- Succeeded by: Liu Junqian

Personal details
- Born: May 12, 1956 (age 70) Lucheng, Shanxi, China
- Party: Chinese Communist Party (1979–2014; expelled)
- Education: Shanxi University

Chinese name
- Traditional Chinese: 申維辰
- Simplified Chinese: 申维辰
Transcriptions
Standard Mandarin
- Hanyu Pinyin: Shēn Wéichén

Shen Weichen (Chinese: 申维辰; born May 12, 1956) is a former Chinese politician from Shanxi province. During his career he served as the Communist Party Secretary of the city of Jinzhong in Shanxi province, the director of propaganda of Shanxi province, and the Party Secretary of Taiyuan, the provincial capital. In September 2010 Shen was transferred to work for the Central Publicity Department of the Communist Party under Liu Yunshan.

After the 18th Party Congress, Shen became a leading figure in the China Association for Science and Technology. He was removed from office in April 2014 by the Central Commission for Discipline Inspection (CCDI); Shen himself was a member of the CCDI. His downfall was notable for the CCDI investigating 'one of their own.' He was sentenced to life in prison in 2016.

== Career ==
Shen was born and raised in Lucheng County, Shanxi province. Shen entered Shanxi University in April 1972, majoring in physical education, where he graduated in December 1975.

Shen became involved in politics in August 1969 and joined the Chinese Communist Party in January 1979.

Shen rose through the ranks to become the CPC Party Secretary of Jinzhong in May 2000. That same year, he was elevated to head the Shanxi Provincial Publicity Department of the Communist Party.

In January 2006, Shen was transferred to Taiyuan, capital of Shanxi Province, and he was appointed the Party Secretary of Taiyuan, a position he held until September 2010. According to Chinese-language media, locals appraisal of Shen's time at the helm of the provincial capital was summed up with the line, "he sold a lot of land, filmed a tv show, and slept with a bunch of women." Shen was allegedly involved in a relationship with a prominent singer from Shanxi province (she was not named in reports). The province's richest man, Zhang Xinming, was reported to have given 5 million yuan (~$812,000) to one of the singer's concerts in order to curry favour with Shen.

In September 2010, Shen was transferred to Beijing and appointed the Deputy Director of the Publicity Department of the Chinese Communist Party, working as the assistant to then-Director Liu Yunshan. He remained in that position until April 2013, when he was promoted to become the Party Group Secretary of China Association for Science and Technology, the largest civic organization overseeing work in science and technology in China with a membership of over 430,000. At the 18th Party Congress Shen was also elected as a member of the 18th Central Commission for Discipline Inspection.

== Downfall ==
In February 2014, Shen's former colleague Jin Daoming, then the Vice-Chairman of the Shanxi Provincial People's Congress, was held for investigation. It was reported that Jin gave evidence that implicated Shen in corruption. On April 12, 2014, Shen was being investigated by the Central Commission for Discipline Inspection for "serious violations of laws and regulations". Shen is the first provincial-ministerial official to be implicated in 2014 as part of the massive anti-corruption campaign following the 18th National Congress of the Chinese Communist Party. He was also the first member of the 18th CCDI itself that was investigated for corruption.

In December 2014, Shen was expelled from the Chinese Communist Party. The party investigation concluded that Shen "abused his power for the illicit gain of others, took massive bribes, received gifts of cash, and committed adultery." His case was forwarded to judicial authorities for prosecution. Shen was sentenced for life in prison for bribery on October 11, 2016.

== Personal life ==
Shen spent much of his career in sports administration, and excelled at sports. He was known to be warm, good-looking, and extraordinarily talkative, often giving lengthy speeches at meetings. Shen is 190 centimetres (6 ft 3 in) tall. Shen was fond of Shanxi history, and was instrumental in planning and filming the 2006 television series Qiao's Grand Courtyard, as well as the series Eighth Route Army and Luliang Heroes (吕梁英雄).

Government offices
Preceded by Fan Duixiang	Commissioner of Jinzhong Region; 1995–1998	Succeeded by Ma You
Party political offices
Preceded by Fan Duixiang	Communist Party Secretary of Jinzhong Region; 1998–2000	Succeeded by Himself as Communist Party Secretary of Jinzhong
New title	Communist Party Secretary of Jinzhong; 1998–2000	Succeeded by Liu Junqian (刘俊谦)
Preceded by Hou Wujie (侯伍杰)	Director of Shanxi Provincial CCP Committee Publicity Department; 2000–2006	Succeeded by Yun Gongmin
Preceded by Yun Gongmin	Communist Party Secretary of Taiyuan; 2006–2010	Succeeded by Chen Chuanping
Preceded by Chen Xi	Communist Party Group Secretary of China Association for Science and Technology; 2013–2014	Succeeded by Shang Yong
