= Ling Zhengce =

Chinese politician

- 令政策

Vice-Chairman of the Shanxi Provincial Committee of the Chinese People's Political Consultative Conference
- In office January 2008 – June 2014
- Chairman: Xue Yanzhong

Director of Shanxi Development and Reform Commission
- In office April 2004 – January 2008
- Governor: Zhang Baoshun; Yu Youjun; Meng Xuenong

Personal details
- Born: Linghu Zhengce (令狐政策); May 1952 (age 74) Pinglu County, Shanxi, China
- Party: Chinese Communist Party (1973–2015, expelled)
- Relations: Brothers: Ling Jihua · Ling Wancheng
- Education: Shanxi University

Ling Zhengce (Chinese: 令政策; pinyin: Lìng Zhèngcè; born May 1952) is a former Chinese politician from Shanxi province. From 2008 to 2014 Ling served as the vice-chairman of the Shanxi Provincial Committee of the Chinese People's Political Consultative Conference, and prior to that the director of Shanxi Development and Reform Commission. Alongside Ling Jihua, he was removed from office in 2014 and charged with corruption, bribery, and graft. Ling Zhengce was then sentenced to 12 1/2 years in prison.

== Biography ==
Born Linghu Zhengce to a Chinese Communist Party (CCP) official's family in Pinglu County, Shanxi Province, Ling and all his three siblings received names related to the CCP terminology. His own name, Zhengce, means "policy".

He got involved in politics in October 1968 and joined the CCP in November 1973. Ling initially worked at a hospital, and then was transferred to work as a laborer a sulfur mine. Between 1971 and 1982 Ling worked for the party organization in Yuncheng, and subsequently for the party's General Office of Shanxi province. In 1984, Ling graduated from Shanxi University, majoring in Chinese literature. After graduation Ling returned to work in the General Office for the "books and literature division" (文书信息处). He spent much of the next decade working for confidential document classification in the provincial government, before being promoted in 1997 to become the deputy director of provincial grain distribution.

Beginning in 2000, Ling worked as a functionary for provincial planning and development. In 2004, he was appointed director of Shanxi Development and Reform Commission, a powerful government agency that had vast powers over the provincial economy. In January 2008, he was appointed the vice-chairman of the Shanxi Provincial Committee of the Chinese People's Political Consultative Conference. On June 19, 2014, it was announced that he would be investigated by the CCP's Central Commission for Discipline Inspection (CCDI) for "serious violations of laws and regulations".

Ling Zhengce's brother Ling Jihua was expelled from the party in mid 2015 and indicted on a series of criminal charges. On August 21, 2015, following the CCDI investigation, Ling Zhengce was also expelled from the CCP. In its official announcement, the CCDI accused Ling of taking bribes to obtain promotions and business interests for others, and for using his office to seek gain for his relatives. He was also accused of obstructing the investigation. Like his brother, Ling Zhengce was also accused of "violating political rules." He was rumoured to be a member of the mysterious Xishan Society.

On December 16, 2016, Ling was sentenced for 12 1/2 years in prison in Changzhou Intermediate Court, for taking either directly or indirectly 16 million yuan ($2.67 million) in bribes from 2001 to 2014.

== Personal life ==
Ling hails from the Ling family of Pinglu County, Shanxi. He has three brothers and one sister.

His brother, Ling Jihua was also removed from office and sentenced to life in prison in 2014. Ling Jihua was one of the top aides to former Communist Party general secretary Hu Jintao and served as the vice-chairman of Chinese People's Political Consultative Conference and the head of the United Front Work Department before he was tried for corruption, abuse of power, and bribery and then given a life sentence in prison.

His youngest brother, Ling Wancheng, a golf enthusiast and businessman, reportedly fled to the United States.
