= Youth Business China =

Chinese youth entrepreneurship program

Youth Business China (Chinese: 中国青年创业国际计划), abbreviated YBC, is a non-profit program in the People's Republic of China that aims to promote youth entrepreneurship. It is headquartered in Beijing.

== History ==
YBC was initiated by the All-China Youth Federation (ACYF), the Ministry of Human Resources and Social Security, the All-China Federation of Industry and Commerce, and other agencies in November 2003; YBC is implemented by the China Youth & Children Foundation for Social Education.

By using the tried model from Youth Business International and marshalling resources from all social sectors of China, especially the business community, YBC provides business mentoring, seed money, skills training and network support to young entrepreneurs, thus helps them succeed in business start-ups.

YBC helps young people aged between 18 - 35 who are unemployed, under-employed and have a viable business idea and the passion for entrepreneurship but who lack business experience and have no access to seed money.

YBC provides young entrepreneurs with between US$4,000 to US$6,600 seed money; one to one accompanied mentoring; knowledge and know-how in running a business and access to business networks

As a non-profit programme with a think-tank function, YBC has been pursuing its goal to "promote entrepreneurship, enhance employability, create job opportunities, revitalise the economy, implement social responsibility and promote social harmony". YBC inspires the potential of youth and encourages them to take action.

In 2005, YBC was accredited as the best practice program by the UN Secretary General's Youth Employment Network Office China.

== Cooperation ==
In September 2008, HP China established a Chinese center for microenterprise development in cooperation with YBC, providing support and training to microenterprises and enterprise starters to use technology to build and grow their business. It provides accessory training rooms serving surplus rural workers, social youths, college students and migrant workers. The HP Microenterprise Development Program, which was introduced to China in 2007, is a nonprofit community investment program.

== Working team ==
YBC National Office Working Team

- Gu Liping - Director General of YBC
- Yang Huadong - Executive Director of China
- Zhang Huiling - Executive Director of China
- Chen Hao - Director of YBC National Office
- Cui Zhiru - Project Manager of YBC
- Zou Shujun - Project Officer of YBC

== See also ==
- Youth Business International
- Micro-enterprise
- Micro-finance
- E-mentoring
- China Youth Development Foundation
- List of charities in China
- List of NGOs in China
