= Pinglu County =

Pinglu County 平陆县
- County
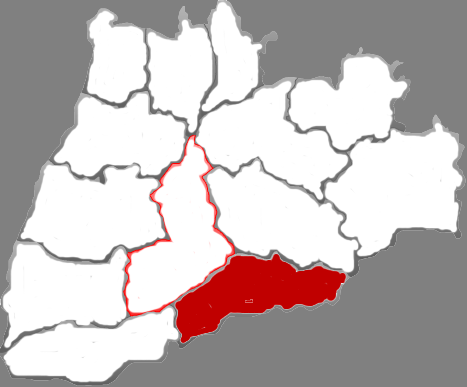
- Location in Yuncheng

- Location of the county seat in Shanxi
- Coordinates (Pinglu County government): 34°49′47″N 111°11′38″E
- Country: People's Republic of China
- Province: Shanxi
- Prefecture-level city: Yuncheng

Area
  - Total: 1,173.5 km^{2} (453.1 sq mi)

Population (2020)
  - Total: 205,080
  - Density: 174.76/km^{2} (452.62/sq mi)
- Time zone: UTC+8 (China Standard)
- Website: pinglu.gov.cn

Pinglu County (simplified Chinese: 平陆县; traditional Chinese: 平陸縣; pinyin: Pínglù Xiàn) is a county in southern Shanxi province of China. It is under the administration of the prefecture-level city of Yuncheng and has a population of approximately 200,000 people. Pinglu is historically an agricultural county, producing apples, peaches, apricots, dates, and tomatoes. Local industry is largely concentrated in mining for coal, aluminum, iron, sulphur, and gypsum. Pinglu has a history that dates back to the Xia dynasty. Facing Henan's Sanmenxia to the south across the Yellow River, Pinglu is on the route of the G5512 Jincheng–Xinxiang Expressway and China National Highway 209. It is located within the China Standard Time Zone (GMT+8).

Pinglu was home to the Ling political family: Ling Jihua, Ling Zhengce, and Ling Wancheng.

== Climate ==
Climate data for Pinglu, elevation 411 m (1,348 ft), (1991–2020 normals, extremes 1981–2010)
Month	Jan	Feb	Mar	Apr	May	Jun	Jul	Aug	Sep	Oct	Nov	Dec	Year
Record high °C (°F)	16.7 (62.1)	23.3 (73.9)	30.0 (86.0)	36.8 (98.2)	39.7 (103.5)	42.1 (107.8)	41.8 (107.2)	40.2 (104.4)	39.4 (102.9)	31.5 (88.7)	28.0 (82.4)	19.2 (66.6)	42.1 (107.8)
Mean daily maximum °C (°F)	5.4 (41.7)	9.6 (49.3)	15.9 (60.6)	22.7 (72.9)	27.6 (81.7)	31.7 (89.1)	32.6 (90.7)	30.9 (87.6)	26.1 (79.0)	20.3 (68.5)	13.1 (55.6)	6.9 (44.4)	20.2 (68.4)
Daily mean °C (°F)	−0.1 (31.8)	3.6 (38.5)	9.5 (49.1)	16.0 (60.8)	21.0 (69.8)	25.3 (77.5)	27.1 (80.8)	25.6 (78.1)	20.5 (68.9)	14.4 (57.9)	7.4 (45.3)	1.3 (34.3)	14.3 (57.7)
Mean daily minimum °C (°F)	−4.2 (24.4)	−0.8 (30.6)	4.3 (39.7)	10.2 (50.4)	15.1 (59.2)	19.7 (67.5)	22.8 (73.0)	21.6 (70.9)	16.4 (61.5)	9.9 (49.8)	3.1 (37.6)	−2.7 (27.1)	9.6 (49.3)
Record low °C (°F)	−12.8 (9.0)	−11.2 (11.8)	−7.0 (19.4)	−0.8 (30.6)	5.3 (41.5)	12.0 (53.6)	16.3 (61.3)	13.8 (56.8)	5.2 (41.4)	−1.8 (28.8)	−9.5 (14.9)	−14.0 (6.8)	−14.0 (6.8)
Average precipitation mm (inches)	5.3 (0.21)	8.6 (0.34)	16.1 (0.63)	34.1 (1.34)	55.4 (2.18)	65.7 (2.59)	94.8 (3.73)	84.9 (3.34)	86.1 (3.39)	51.5 (2.03)	21.9 (0.86)	3.5 (0.14)	527.9 (20.78)
Average precipitation days (≥ 0.1 mm)	3.2	3.6	5.0	6.4	7.8	8.1	9.3	9.5	9.9	7.9	5.6	2.6	78.9
Average snowy days	3.9	3.2	1.4	0.2	0	0	0	0	0	0	1.5	2.6	12.8
Average relative humidity (%)	55	55	53	55	57	61	71	74	74	71	67	57	63
Mean monthly sunshine hours	123.7	128.5	164.0	197.6	215.7	209.3	207.2	189.3	152.1	143.7	132.2	137.1	2,000.4
Percentage possible sunshine	39	41	44	50	50	48	47	46	41	42	43	45	45
Source: China Meteorological Administration
