= Zhang Zhongsheng =

Chinese politician (born 1952)

- 张中生

Vice Mayor of Lüliang
- In office June 2003 – March 2013
- Mayor: Nie Chunyu→Dong Hongyun→Zhang Jiuping→Ding Xuefeng

Personal details
- Born: November 1952 (age 73) Liulin County, Shanxi, China
- Party: Chinese Communist Party (1975–2016, expelled)
- Education: Central Party School of the Chinese Communist Party

Chinese name
- Simplified Chinese: 张中生
- Traditional Chinese: 張中生
Transcriptions
Standard Mandarin
- Hanyu Pinyin: Zhāng Zhōngshēng

Zhang Zhongsheng (Chinese: 张中生; born November 1952) is a former Chinese politician who spent his entire career in his home-province Shanxi. He was investigated by China's top anti-graft agency in May 2014. Previously he served as vice mayor of Lüliang, and before that, magistrate and then party secretary of Zhongyang County, the coal-rich county where he worked for over 34 years. Zhang was sacked for graft in May 2014 and was sentenced to death with a two-year reprieve for accepting bribes worth 1.04 billion yuan ($160 million).

== Early life and career ==
Zhang was born in Liulin County, Shanxi, in November 1952. He entered the workforce in July 1969, and joined the Chinese Communist Party (CCP) in February 1975.

Zhang served in various posts in the Grain Bureau of the coal-rich Zhongyang County before getting involved in politics in 1985, when he was appointed director of Zhongyang County Administration for Industry and Commerce. Two years later, he became director of the Finance Bureau of Zhongyang County. In 1990, he became deputy magistrate of the county, rising to executive deputy county magistrate in 1993 and then magistrate in 1996. In 1998, he rose to become party secretary, the top political position in the county, and held that office until 2003. In June 2003, he took office as vice mayor of Lüliang, responsible for coal work, and served until his resignation in March 2013. He was also a member of the standing committee of the CCP Lüliang Municipal Committee, the city's top authority. Zhang was known for his splendid hilltop mansions and dubbed the "godfather" because of his influence and power in Lüliang.

=== Downfall ===
On 29 May 2014, he was put under investigation for alleged "serious violations of discipline and laws" by the Central Commission for Discipline Inspection (CCDI), the party's internal disciplinary body, and the National Supervisory Commission, the highest anti-corruption agency of China.

In December 2015, he was taken away and put on file for investigation.

In January 2016, he was expelled from the Communist Party and was stripped of his retirement benefits, and his case was handed over to the procuratorate.

On 28 March 2018, he stood trial at the Intermediate People's Court of Linfen on charges of taking bribes. He was accused of illegally accepting money and gifts amounting to over 1.04 billion yuan ($160 million) while holding various government positions between 1997 and 2013 in Zhongyang County and Lüliang, abusing his positions of power to help others in providing assistance in coal resource integration, project approval and other matters. In addition, more than 130 million yuan ($20.36 million) of property could not be explained. He was sentenced to death for holding a huge amount of property with unidentified sources and taking bribes. He was also deprived of his political rights for life, and ordered by the court to have all his personal assets confiscated and turn over all illicit gains and their interests to the state. Zhang was the second official to be sentenced to death since the 18th National Congress of the Chinese Communist Party in late 2012, after Zhao Liping, a former police chief in Inner Mongolia, was executed for the gruesome murder of his reported lover and for having accepted bribes totaling nearly 24 million yuan ($3.45 million). Zhang's three superiors, Nie Chunyu, Dong Hongyun and Ding Xuefeng were caught in the next few months.

On 19 October 2021, the Higher People's Court of Shanxi held a public hearing in the second instance to hear the appeal case of Zhang, who took bribes and had a huge amount of property of unknown origin. On October 29, Zhang was sentenced to death with a two-year reprieve for taking bribes worth 1.04 billion yuan ($160 million).
