= Yqb (disambiguation) =

YQB may refer to:

- Québec City Jean Lesage International Airport, Canada, IATA code YQB
- Yangquan North railway station, Shanxi Province, China, Pinyin code YQB
