= Ministry of Veterans Affairs (China) =

Chinese executive department on veterans' affairs

Ministry of Veterans Affairs of the People's Republic of China
- 中华人民共和国退役军人事务部; Zhōnghuá Rénmín Gònghéguó Tuìyì Jūnrén Shìwù Bù
- Logo of the Ministry of Veterans Affairs

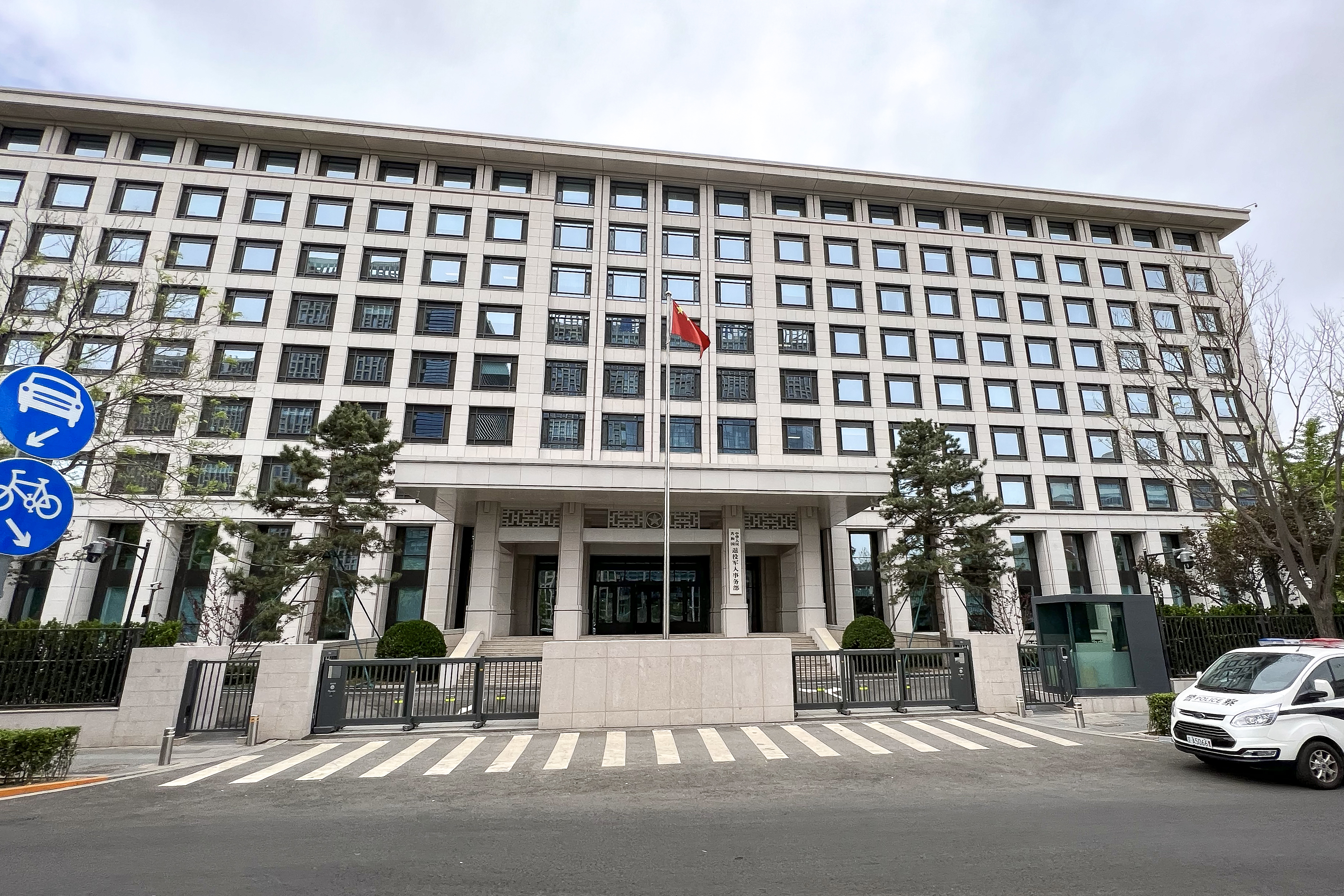

Agency overview
- Formed: March 19, 2018; 8 years ago
- Type: Constituent Department of the State Council (cabinet-level executive department)
- Jurisdiction: Government of China
- Headquarters: Beijing
- Minister responsible: Pei Jinjia, Minister
- Deputy Ministers responsible: Qian Feng; Cheng Zhengguo; General Yang Youbin; Ma Feixiong
- Agency executive: Lin Guoyao, Leader of Discipline Inspection & Supervision Team
- Parent agency: State Council
- Website: www.mva.gov.cn

Chinese name
- Simplified Chinese: 中华人民共和国退役军人事务部
- Traditional Chinese: 中華人民共和國退役軍人事務部
Transcriptions
Standard Mandarin
- Hanyu Pinyin: Zhōnghuá Rénmín Gònghéguó Tuìyì Jūnrén Shìwù Bù

The Ministry of Veterans Affairs of the People's Republic of China is a ministry of the State Council which is responsible for military veterans in the country. It was formed on March 19, 2018.

== History ==
On March 19, 2018, it was announced that the Ministry of Veterans Affairs has been created as part of the deepening the reform of the Party and state institutions. That same day, Sun Shaocheng was elected Minister of Veterans Affairs. The Ministry took over some responsibilities of various departments including the Ministry of Civil Affairs, Ministry of Human Resources and Social Security, Political Work Department of the Central Military Commission and Logistic Support Department of the Central Military Commission.

Creation of the Ministry in part responded to protests by military veterans for better pensions and other benefits.

== Functions ==
The Ministry is responsible for the management and provision of services of military veterans, retired firefighters and search and rescue personnel in China, totaling around 57 million as of 2023. According to the regulations concerning the Ministry, it is tasked with overseeing ideological and political management of veterans, helping them transition to civilian life, and administer them benefits related to social welfare, medical care, employment training, and entrepreneurship incentives. It is also tasked with publicizing veterans who made contributions to the Chinese Communist Party (CCP), the state and the people, managing the commemoration of official martyrs, and assisting injured or disabled veterans.
