= Li Jianping (politician, born 1960) =

Chinese politician (1960–2024)

- 李建平

Secretary of the Party Working Committee of Hohhot Economic and Technological Development Zone
- In office March 2011 – September 2018

Personal details
- Born: May 1960 Bazhou, Hebei, China
- Died: 17 December 2024 (aged 64)
- Party: Chinese Communist Party (1985–2019; expelled)

Li Jianping (Chinese: 李建平; pinyin: Lǐ Jiànpíng; May 1960 – 17 December 2024) was a Chinese politician who spent most of his career in Hohhot, capital of Inner Mongolia. He was investigated by the Chinese Communist Party's internal control and anti-graft agency, the Central Commission for Discipline Inspection, in September 2018. Previously he had served as secretary of the Party Working Committee of Hohhot Economic and Technological Development Zone. He embezzled and accepted bribes of more than 3 billion yuan ($469.3 million), becoming the "largest corrupt official" since the founding of the People's Republic of China in 1949. His case was classified as the "largest case so far in the history of corruption in Inner Mongolia".

== Early life and career ==
Li was born in Bazhou, Hebei, in May 1960. In August 1982, he joined the faculty of Inner Mongolia Electronic School. He joined the Chinese Communist Party (CCP) in January 1985. He was secretary of the Youth League Committee of the Inner Mongolia Electronics Industry Bureau in April 1985, and held that office until October 1988, when he was appointed deputy head of Inner Mongolia Brewery.

Jianping got involved in politics in October 1990, when he became an official in Hohhot Economic System Reform Commission. He was made director of the Hohhot Water Saving Office in March 1996, concurrently serving as director of the Water Resources Administration and director of the Water-affairs Authority. In March 2011, he took office as secretary of the Party Working Committee of the Hohhot Economic and Technological Development Zone.

=== Downfall and execution ===
On 7 September 2018, Li Jianping was placed under investigation by the Central Commission for Discipline Inspection (CCDI), the party's internal disciplinary body, and the National Supervisory Commission, the highest anti-corruption agency of China.

Li's deputy Bai Haiquan (白海泉) was put under investigation in July 2014 and sentenced to life imprisonment for corruption and taking bribes of more than 170 million yuan ($26.594 million).

On 22 August 2019, Li Jianping was expelled from the party and removed from public office. Under the "Criminal Law of the People's Republic of China", he was transferred to the prosecution authorities for investigation and the property involved in the case was transferred along with the case.

On 27 September 2022, Li was sentenced to death by the Intermediate People's Court of the Hinggan League. The amount involved in the case reached more than 3 billion yuan ($414 million), which is much higher than the case of Lai Xiaomin, the former chairman of Huarong (more than 1.7 billion yuan), and Zhao Zhengyong, the former secretary of Shaanxi (717 million yuan).

Li was executed on 17 December 2024, at the age of 64.

== Personal life ==
Li's son Li Suchao (李苏超) was a senior executive and major shareholder of Inner Mongolia Dongsheng Real Estate Development Co., Ltd. (内蒙古东晟房地产开发有限责任公司). Li Suchao has fled overseas.

== See also ==
- Zhang Zhongsheng, former vice mayor of Lüliang, was sentenced to death with a two-year reprieve for taking bribes worth 1.04 billion yuan ($160 million).
