= Minister of Veterans Affairs =

Minister of Veterans Affairs may refer to:

- Minister for Veterans' Affairs (Australia)
- Minister of Veterans Affairs (Canada)
- Minister of Veterans Affairs (China)
- Ministry of Croatian Veterans
- Minister of Veterans Affairs (France)
- United States Secretary of Veterans Affairs
- Ministry for Veterans Affairs (Ukraine)
