= COVID-19 pandemic in Shanxi =

- Disease: COVID-19
- Pathogen: SARS-CoV-2
- Location: Shanxi, China
- First outbreak: Wuhan, Hubei
- Arrival date: 2020
- Confirmed cases: 7,164
- Active cases: 1,891
- Recovered: 5,272
- Deaths: 1

The COVID-19 pandemic reached the province of Shanxi, China.

== Statistics ==
Division	Active	Confirmed	Deceased	Recovered
Shanxi	1,891	7,164	1	5,272
Taiyuan	774	55		
Jinzhong	100	60		
Yuncheng	376	75		
Shuozhou	500	85		
Datong	1,000	95		
Xinzhou	147	0		
Jincheng	346	0		
Changzhi	100	0		
Luliang	100	0		
Yangquan	500	0		
Linfen	371	0		
Overseas import personnel	145	0		

== Timeline ==
=== 2020 ===
On January 22, the first confirmed case of pneumonia with a new type of coronavirus infection appeared in Shanxi Province, and six close contacts have been tracked and medically observed.

=== 2021 ===
On January 3, Shanxi Province added 1 newly imported confirmed case (imported from Poland).

=== 2022 ===
On January 22, Yungang District of Datong City conducted a nucleic acid test on a returnee from Fengtai District of Beijing, and the result was positive. In the early morning of January 23, the results of the review by the Municipal Center for Disease Control and Prevention and the Fourth People's Hospital of the Municipality were all positive.
