= Bai Yun (politician) =

Chinese politician

- 白云

Head of the United Front Work Department of Shanxi Province
- In office February 2013 – September 2014
- Party Secretary: Yuan Chunqing
- Preceded by: Nie Chunyu
- Succeeded by: Sun Shaocheng

Communist Party Secretary of Yuncheng
- In office January 2012 – February 2013
- Preceded by: Gao Weidong (高卫东)
- Succeeded by: Wang Maoshe

Communist Party Secretary of Yangquan
- In office April 2009 – January 2012
- Preceded by: Xie Hai (谢海)
- Succeeded by: Hong Fake (洪发科)

Mayor of Yangquan
- In office April 2006 – April 2009
- Preceded by: Xie Hai
- Succeeded by: Li Dongliang (李栋梁)

Personal details
- Born: December 1960 (age 65) Wutai County, Shanxi, China
- Party: Chinese Communist Party (1979–2015, expelled)
- Education: Renmin University of China

Bai Yun (simplified Chinese: 白云; traditional Chinese: 白雲; pinyin: Bái Yún; born December 1960) is a Chinese regional politician from Shanxi province. She was the Chinese Communist Party Committee Secretary of Yuncheng between 2012 and 2013. Bai was the first female official of provincial-ministerial rank to be investigated for corruption after the 18th National Congress of the Chinese Communist Party. At the time the investigation against her was opened, she was serving as a member of the Shanxi Provincial Party Committee and the Head of the United Front Work Department of Shanxi Province. She was expelled from the Party in 2015 for abuse of power and accepting bribes.

== Career ==
Bai Yun was born and raised in Wutai County, Shanxi, she earned a master's degree in business administration from Renmin University of China in 1997.

Bai Yun became involved in politics in December 1986 and joined the Chinese Communist Party (CCP) in December 1979.

Beginning in 1984, she served in several posts in Shuozhou, Shanxi, including Communist Youth League Secretary of the municipal party committee, Communist Youth League Vice Secretary of provincial party committee, and Secretary of party committee.

She was appointed as the CCP Deputy Committee Secretary of Lüliang in February 2004, a position she held until February 2006, when she was transferred to Yangquan as the Deputy Party Secretary. After two months, she also served as the Mayor. In April 2009, she was promoted to become the Party Secretary, earning full departmental-level (zhengtingji) rank. In January 2012, Bai was named acting Party Secretary of Yuncheng, replacing Gao Weidong (高卫东). In January 2013, she became a member of the provincial Party Standing Committee. One month later, she was elevated to the head of the United Front Work Department of the provincial Party committee.

== Downfall ==
On August 29, 2014, it was announced that Bai Yun was undergoing investigation by the Central Commission for Discipline Inspection for "serious violations of laws and regulations". Several other provincial Standing Committee members were also investigated as part of a "political earthquake" that shook the province in 2014.

In February 2015, at the conclusion of the internal party investigation, Bai Yun was accused of taking "massive bribes" and abuse of power, and expelled from the CCP. Bai was tried at the People's Intermediate Court in Nantong, Jiangsu province. The prosecution accused Bai of taking some 17.81 million yuan (~$2.3 million) in bribes during her term as party chief of Yangquan, from the chief executive of an environmental engineering company and "16 other individuals," in exchange for favourable treatment in the approval of projects and the promotion of subordinates. Bai did not contest the charges. On October 19, 2016, Bai was sentenced to 12 years in prison.

Party political offices
Preceded by Gao Jianmin	Secretary of Shanxi Provincial Committee of the Communist Youth League of China; 2001–2003	Succeeded by Zhang Jiuping
Preceded by Xie Hai	Communist Party Secretary of Yangquan; 2009–2012	Succeeded by Hong Fake
Preceded by Gao Weidong	Communist Party Secretary of Yuncheng; 2012–2013	Succeeded by Wang Maoshe
Preceded by Nie Chunyu	Head of the United Front Work Department of Shanxi Province; 2013–2014	Succeeded by Sun Shaocheng
Government offices
Preceded by Xie Hai	Mayor of Yangquan; 2006–2009	Succeeded by Li Dongliang
