= Ministry of Veterans Affairs =

Ministry of Veterans Affairs may refer to:

- Ministry of Veterans Affairs (China)
- Ministry for Veterans Affairs (Ukraine)
- Ministry of Croatian Veterans
