= Ding Xuefeng =

Chinese politician (born 1963)

- 丁雪峰

Mayor of Lüliang
- In office January 2012 – February 2014
- Party Secretary: Gao Weidong
- Preceded by: Zhang Jiuping
- Succeeded by: Dong Yan

Personal details
- Born: September 1963 (age 62–63) Zuoyun County, Shanxi, China
- Party: Chinese Communist Party
- Education: Shanxi University; Central Party School of the Chinese Communist Party

Ding Xuefeng (Chinese: 丁雪峰; pinyin: Dīng Xuěfēng; born September 1963) is a former Chinese politician who served as mayor of Lüliang between 2012 and 2014. He was investigated by China's top anti-graft agency in February 2014.

== Biography ==
Ding was born in Zuoyun County, Shanxi, in September 1963. He entered the workforce in January 1981, and joined the Chinese Communist Party (CCP) in August 1986. In 1986, he enrolled in Shanxi University, majoring in Chinese language and literature.

After graduating in 1988, he was despatched to the General Office of Shanxi Provincial People's Government as an official. He became magistrate of Hequ County, a county under the jurisdiction of Xinzhou, in November 1996, and then party secretary, the top political position in the city, beginning in September 1999.

In January 2001, he was assigned as vice mayor to Lüliang, a region abounds with coal in central Shanxi province, and in April 2006 was admitted to member of the standing committee of the CCP Lüliang Municipal Committee, the city's top authority. In January 2012, he was named acting mayor of Lüliang, and was installed on March 30.

=== Downfall ===
In December 2013, Ding was taken away by the Communist Party's anti-graft watchdog.

On 20 February 2014, he was dismissed from public office. On March 2, his qualification for delegates to the 12th National People' Congress was terminated. By bribing Li Dongsheng, former vice minister of Public Security, Ding bought the position of mayor in Lüliang. Ding first looked for Mr. Jia (贾某), the father of Zhou Bin's stepmother. But at that time, Zhou and his family seemed to have a premonition that the political situation was wrong, and returned the illicit money. Ding's predecessors, Nie Chunyu and Dong Hongyun, were sacked for graft in the same year.

Government offices
Preceded by Zhang Jiuping	Mayor of Lüliang; 2012–2014	Succeeded by Dong Yan
