= Liu Guanglong =

Chinese politician (born 1958)

- 刘广龙

Vice-Chairman of Lüliang Municipal Committee of the Chinese People's Political Consultative Conference
- In office 29 March 2013 – December 2014

Communist Party Secretary of Zhongyang County
- In office August 2009 – March 2013

Personal details
- Born: 1958 (age 67–68) Wenshui County, Shanxi, China
- Party: Chinese Communist Party (1984–2015; expelled)
- Education: Shanxi University

Chinese name
- Traditional Chinese: 劉廣龍
- Simplified Chinese: 刘广龙
Transcriptions
Standard Mandarin
- Hanyu Pinyin: Liǘ Guǎnglóng

Liu Guanglong (born 1958) is a former Chinese politician who spent most of his career in north China's Shanxi. He was investigated by the Chinese Communist Party's anti-graft agency in December 2014. Previously he served as the Vice-Chairman of Lüliang Committee of the Chinese People's Political Consultative Conference.

== Life and career ==
Liu was born and raised in Wenshui County, Shanxi.

He began his political career in September 1982, and joined the Chinese Communist Party in September 1984.

After graduating from Shanxi University in 1982 he was assigned to Lüliang as an officer.

In April 1990, he was appointed the head of Organization Department of Jiaokou County, and concurrently served as a Standing Committee of the Jiaokou County Committee.

In February 2001 he was promoted to become the Deputy Communist Party Secretary and County Governor of Fangshan County, he remained in that positions until February 2003, when he was transferred to Lishi and appointed the Deputy Communist Party Secretary and mayor.

From October 2008 he served as Deputy Communist Party Secretary and Party Branch Secretary of Fenyang. One mouth later, he was named acting mayor.

In August 2009 he was promoted to become the Communist Party Secretary of Zhongyang County, a position he held until March 2013, while he was appointed the Vice-Chairman of Lüliang Committee of the Chinese People's Political Consultative Conference.

== Downfall ==
In December 2014, he was being investigated by the Central Commission for Discipline Inspection for "serious violations of laws and regulations".

On June 5, 2015, he was expelled from the Chinese Communist Party (CCP) and removed from public office.
