= Dong Hongyun =

Chinese politician (born 1956)

- 董洪运

Communist Party Secretary of Xinzhou
- In office April 2009 – December 2014
- Preceded by: Zhang Jianxin (张建欣)
- Succeeded by: Li Junming (李俊明)

Mayor of Lüliang
- In office February 2006 – April 2009
- Preceded by: Nie Chunyu
- Succeeded by: Zhang Jiuping (张九萍)

Personal details
- Born: November 1956 (age 69) Hongdong County, Shanxi, China
- Party: Chinese Communist Party (1984–2015; expelled)
- Education: Shanxi Normal University; Jilin University

Dong Hongyun (simplified Chinese: 董洪运; traditional Chinese: 董洪運; pinyin: Dǒng Hóngyùn; born November 1956) is a former Chinese politician from Shanxi province. He was investigated by the Chinese Communist Party's anti-graft agency in December 2014. Previously he served as the Communist Party Secretary of Xinzhou and before that, mayor of Lüliang.

Dong was a member of the 11th National People's Congress.

== Career ==
Dong was born and raised in Hongdong County, Shanxi. He graduated from Shanxi Normal University.

He joined the Chinese Communist Party in June 1976, and got involved in politics in January 1982.

In January 1984, he was appointed Communist Party Secretary of Wan'an Town, and a Standing Committee of the CPC Hongdong County Committee.

In May 1986, he was appointed the Deputy Communist Party Secretary of Xiangning County, he remained in that position until March 1990, when he was transferred to Fushan County and appointed the Deputy Communist Party Secretary. He served as County Governor and Deputy Communist Party Secretary of Fushan County from November 1992, and Communist Party Secretary, the top political position in the county, between May 1993 to November 1995.

In January 2001 he was promoted to become the Vice-Mayor of Yuncheng, a position he held until February 2006, when he was promoted to Mayor and Deputy Communist Party Secretary of Lüliang.

Dong served as Communist Party Secretary of Xinzhou beginning in April 2009, until he was taken into custody for investigation in December 2014.

== Downfall ==
On December 29, 2014, state media reported that Dong was being investigated by the Central Commission for Discipline Inspection of the Chinese Communist Party for "serious violations of laws and regulations". Along with Datong party chief Feng Lixiang, and Yuncheng party chief Wang Maoshe, Dong was one of three sitting municipal leaders investigated in Shanxi province during the sweeping anti-corruption crackdown following the 18th Party Congress.

On August 7, 2015, Dong was expelled from the Chinese Communist Party following the CCDI investigation. The CCDI accused Dong of being "disloyal and not nice" to the party, "kept important personal information from the [party] organization," visited "private clubs", "sold offices for cash", "unduly interfered in the administrative processing and approvals process [of projects]", and solicited and accepted bribes. He was also said to have interfered in the investigation process, "lied and tried to hide facts from the [investigating] organization, and attempted to conspire with his associates to obstruct the investigation." Dong was indicted on charges of bribery. He was promptly arrested following the announcement to face judicial proceedings. He was detained by Shanxi Provincial People's Procuratorate on August 17.

In December 2017, Yangquan People's Procuratorate announced the indictment of Dong's bribery and unidentified source of huge assets. According to the indictment, Dong took advantage of his positions to seek benefits for others, illegally accepted money and property worth over 43.43 million yuan, 6.2 million Hong Kong dollars, 760,000 US dollars, 200,000 euros, 210,000 yuan worth of shopping cards, and 1.27 million yuan worth of gold bars, paintings and other items. All his illegal gains will be confiscated and handed over to the State.

Party political offices
Preceded by Zhang Jianxin	Communist Party Secretary of Xinzhou; 2009–2014	Succeeded by Li Junming
Government offices
Preceded by Nie Chunyu	Mayor of Lüliang; 2006–2009	Succeeded by Zhang Jiuping
