= Gong Qinggai =

Chinese politician

- 龚清概

Deputy Director of the Taiwan Affairs Office
- In office October 2013 – January 2016 Serving with Ye Kedong, Chen Yuanfeng, Li Yafei
- Director: Zhang Zhijun

Mayor of Nanping
- In office June 2007 – February 2010
- Preceded by: Chen Hua
- Succeeded by: Pei Jinjia

Communist Party Secretary of Jinjiang
- In office May 2002 – June 2005

Mayor of Jinjiang
- In office January 1996 – October 2003

Personal details
- Born: June 1958 (age 68) Shishi, Fujian, China
- Party: Chinese Communist Party (1979–2016; expelled)
- Education: Open University of Hong Kong; Central Party School of the Chinese Communist Party

Gong Qinggai (simplified Chinese: 龚清概; traditional Chinese: 龔清概; pinyin: Gōng Qīnggaì; born June 1958) is a former Chinese politician who spent most of his career throughout the southeastern China's Fujian province. As of January 2016 he was under investigation by the Communist Party's anti-corruption agency. He served in various administrative and political roles in Fujian province and over a period of 35 years worked his way up to the position of deputy director of the Taiwan Affairs Office. He served as mayor of Jinjiang, a county-level city under the jurisdiction of Quanzhou, from January 1996 to October 2003, and Communist Party Secretary, the top political position in the city, from May 2002 to June 2005.

He was a member of the 11th National People's Congress and a member of the 18th National Congress of the Chinese Communist Party.

Gong is fluent in Taiwanese (Hokkien).

== Biography ==
Gong was born in Shishi, Fujian, in June 1958. He graduated from the Open University of Hong Kong.

He joined the Chinese Communist Party in March 1979, and entered the workforce in September 1980.

He served in various posts in Jinjiang County before serving as vice-mayor of Jinjiang in December 1992. In April 1995 he was promoted to become deputy party chief and mayor of Jijiang, and held that offices until May 2002. Then he was promoted again to become party chief of Jinjiang. He also served as deputy party chief of Quanzhou from March 2005 to January 2007. In January 2007, he was transferred to Nanping, and served as its deputy party chief and vice-mayor. Five months later, he was promoted to the Mayor position. In February 2010, he was transferred to Pingtan Comprehensive Pilot Zone, where he served as secretary of Party Working Committee and director of the Administrative Committee. In October 2013, he was appointed as deputy director of the Taiwan Affairs Office. When he was in office, he made a secret visit to Taiwan.

== Downfall ==
On January 19, 2016, Gong Qinggai came under investigation for "serious legal violations", a brief statement issued by the Central Commission for Discipline Inspection on its website, without elaborating. He was expelled from the Communist Party on April 21, for "violates political discipline, membership in private clubs, plays golf and bribery".

On April 20, 2017, Gong Qinggai was sentenced for 15 years in prison, having been convicted on charges of bribery by the Anyang People's Intermediate Court. Five million yuan of personal assets were seized, and all of his earnings deemed to have come from corrupt sources were confiscated by the national treasury. The total value of bribes recorded by the court was 53.52 million yuan.

Government offices
Preceded by Chen Hua	Mayor of Nanping; 2007–2010	Succeeded by Pei Jinjia
