= Pingding County =

Pingding County 平定县 Pingting
- County
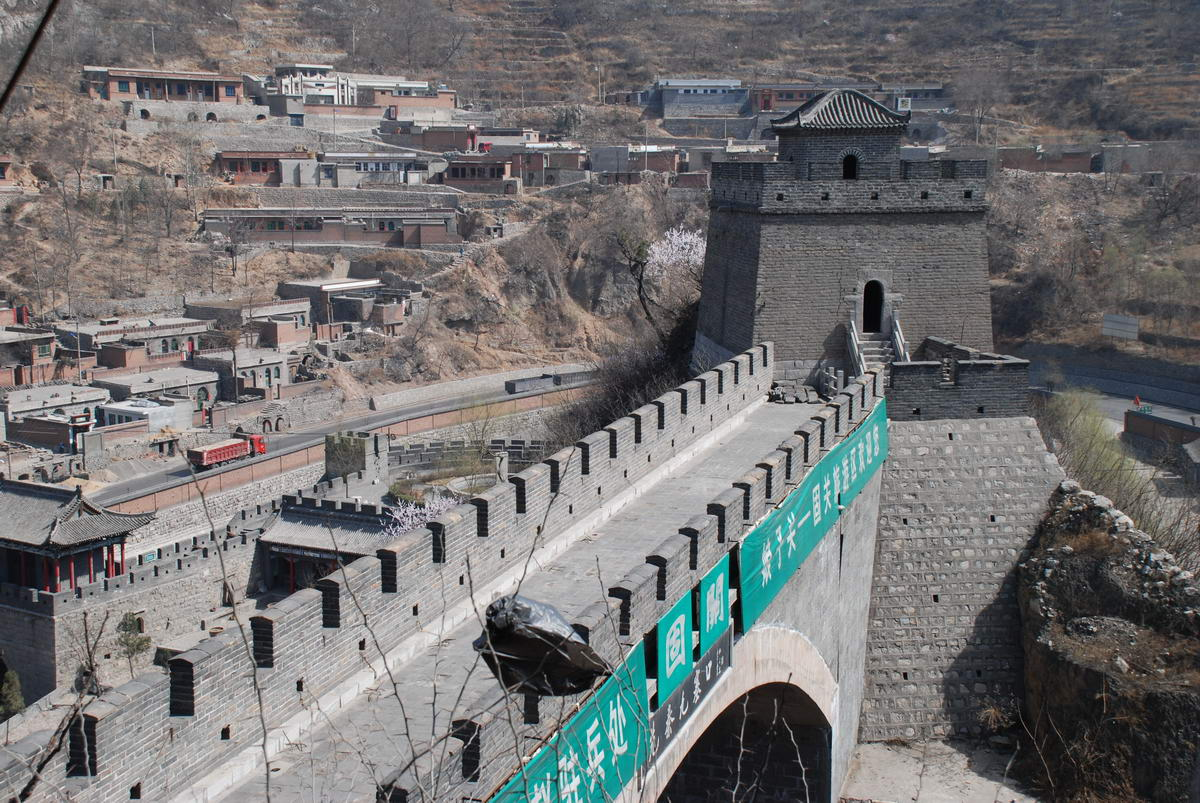

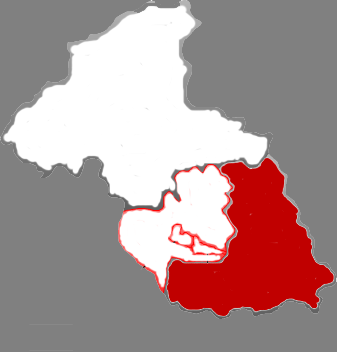
- Pingding in Yangquan

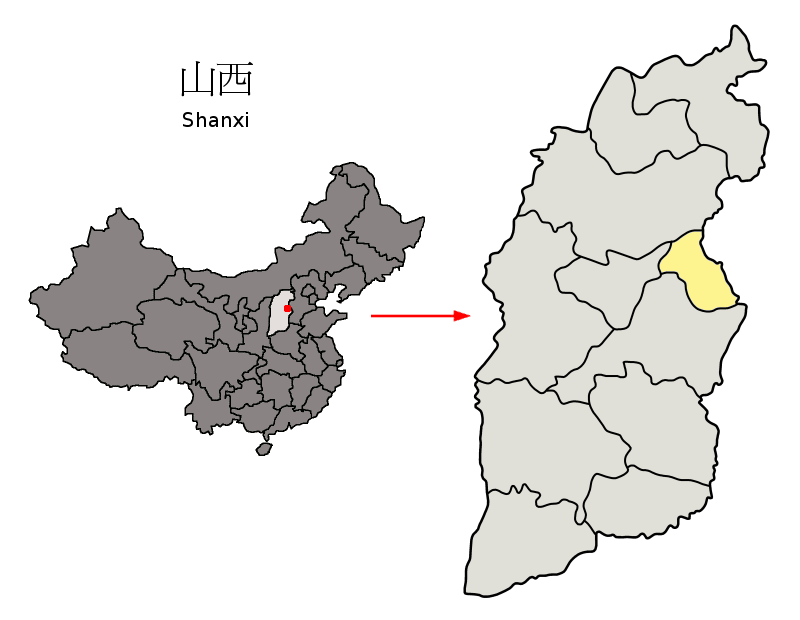
- Yangquan in Shanxi
- Coordinates: 37°48′18″N 113°37′47″E
- Country: People's Republic of China
- Province: Shanxi
- Prefecture-level city: Yangquan
- Time zone: UTC+8 (China Standard)

Pingding County (Chinese: 平定县; pinyin: Píngdìng Xiàn) is a county in the east of Shanxi Province, People's Republic of China, bordering Hebei to the east. It is under the jurisdiction of the prefecture-level city of Yangquan, occupying its southeast corner.

== Climate ==
Climate data for Pingding, elevation 753 m (2,470 ft), (1991–2020 normals, extremes 1981–2010)
Month	Jan	Feb	Mar	Apr	May	Jun	Jul	Aug	Sep	Oct	Nov	Dec	Year
Record high °C (°F)	15.7 (60.3)	24.9 (76.8)	29.9 (85.8)	37.2 (99.0)	39.3 (102.7)	41.7 (107.1)	41.2 (106.2)	36.8 (98.2)	37.4 (99.3)	30.9 (87.6)	26.6 (79.9)	18.7 (65.7)	41.7 (107.1)
Mean daily maximum °C (°F)	2.9 (37.2)	6.5 (43.7)	13.1 (55.6)	20.6 (69.1)	26.0 (78.8)	29.6 (85.3)	30.0 (86.0)	28.2 (82.8)	24.2 (75.6)	18.6 (65.5)	10.9 (51.6)	4.3 (39.7)	17.9 (64.2)
Daily mean °C (°F)	−3.8 (25.2)	−0.6 (30.9)	5.8 (42.4)	13.1 (55.6)	19.0 (66.2)	22.7 (72.9)	24.0 (75.2)	22.4 (72.3)	17.7 (63.9)	11.6 (52.9)	4.2 (39.6)	−1.9 (28.6)	11.2 (52.1)
Mean daily minimum °C (°F)	−8.6 (16.5)	−5.7 (21.7)	0.1 (32.2)	6.8 (44.2)	12.5 (54.5)	16.7 (62.1)	19.3 (66.7)	17.9 (64.2)	12.7 (54.9)	6.4 (43.5)	−0.7 (30.7)	−6.4 (20.5)	5.9 (42.6)
Record low °C (°F)	−17.7 (0.1)	−16.6 (2.1)	−12.6 (9.3)	−3.8 (25.2)	2.8 (37.0)	8.5 (47.3)	12.4 (54.3)	10.1 (50.2)	2.7 (36.9)	−5.4 (22.3)	−15.8 (3.6)	−17.2 (1.0)	−17.7 (0.1)
Average precipitation mm (inches)	3.2 (0.13)	4.9 (0.19)	9.3 (0.37)	28.4 (1.12)	37.3 (1.47)	60.0 (2.36)	142.7 (5.62)	120.8 (4.76)	63.0 (2.48)	30.3 (1.19)	14.8 (0.58)	3.1 (0.12)	517.8 (20.39)
Average precipitation days (≥ 0.1 mm)	2.4	2.9	3.2	6.0	7.2	11.0	13.7	12.6	9.2	6.2	3.8	1.9	80.1
Average snowy days	3.9	4.4	2.8	0.9	0	0	0	0	0	0.2	2.6	3.4	18.2
Average relative humidity (%)	47	47	43	43	46	56	71	75	69	60	52	46	55
Mean monthly sunshine hours	184.3	183.8	225.5	245.4	274.9	244.1	218.2	218.3	205.9	205.7	190.7	185.3	2,582.1
Percentage possible sunshine	60	60	60	62	62	55	49	52	56	60	63	63	59
Source: China Meteorological Administration

== Transportation ==
- China National Highway 207
