= Du Shanxue =

Chinese politician

- 杜善学

Vice-Governor of Shanxi
- In office January 2013 – June 2014
- Governor: Li Xiaopeng

Secretary General of Shanxi Provincial Committee of the Chinese Communist Party
- In office January 2012 – January 2013
- Preceded by: Li Zhengwen
- Succeeded by: Nie Chunyu

Communist Party Secretary of Lüliang
- In office January 2011 – January 2012
- Preceded by: Nie Chunyu
- Succeeded by: Gao Weidong

Communist Party Secretary of Changzhi
- In office February 2008 – January 2011
- Preceded by: Zhang Bingsheng
- Succeeded by: Tian Xirong

Mayor of Changzhi
- In office March 2003 – February 2008
- Preceded by: Zhang Bingsheng
- Succeeded by: Zhang Bao

Personal details
- Born: February 1956 (age 70) Lingyi County, Shanxi, China
- Party: Chinese Communist Party (1975-2015, expelled)
- Spouse: Hao Suzhen
- Education: Shanxi University; Shanxi University of Finance and Economics

Chinese name
- Traditional Chinese: 杜善學
- Simplified Chinese: 杜善学
Transcriptions
Standard Mandarin
- Hanyu Pinyin: Dù Shànxué

Du Shanxue (Chinese: 杜善学; born February 1956) is a former Chinese politician from Shanxi province. He successively served as the mayor and Chinese Communist Party Secretary of Changzhi, Party Secretary of Lüliang, and Secretary General of the Shanxi Provincial Party Committee, and the province's Vice-Governor.

Du was removed from office and investigated for corruption in June 2014 along with several of his colleagues, in a precursor to what amounted to a collapse of the political establishment in Shanxi in the face of the party's anti-corruption campaign under Xi Jinping.

== Life ==
Du was born and raised in Lingyi County, Shanxi, where he graduated from Shanxi University of Finance and Economics in 1982, after the resumption of university entrance examination, and received his master of philosophy degree from Shanxi University in 2000. After graduation, he worked at the Shanxi Provincial Government.

Du became involved in politics in June 1976 and joined the Chinese Communist Party (CCP) in March 1975.

In February 2003, he was appointed the CCP Party Vice-Chief of Changzhi, a month later, he also served as the mayor of Changzhi, he was promoted to become the CCP Party Chief in February 2008, a position he held until January 2011. Then he was transferred to Lüliang as the CCP Party Chief.

In January 2012, Du was promoted to become the Secretary General of Shanxi Provincial Party Committee. One year later, he was elected by the 12th Shanxi People's Congress as the Vice-Governor of Shanxi.

== Downfall ==
On June 19, 2014, Du was being investigated by the Central Commission for Discipline Inspection for "serious violations of laws and regulations".

On February 13, 2015, Du was expelled from the CCP. His alleged crimes have also been transferred to prosecutors for further review.

On August 30, 2016, he stood trial for taking bribes, offering bribes and huge amount of property with unknown sources at the Intermediate People's Court of Xuzhou in east China's Jiangsu province. Du was sentenced to life sentence on December 20, 2016. He was also deprived of his political rights for life.

== Personal life ==
Du married Hao Suzhen (郝素珍), who was deputy party branch secretary and deputy director of Shanxi Provincial Audit Department, and was expelled from the CCP and dismissed from public office in August 2015 for taking bribes.

Government offices
Preceded by Zhang Bingsheng	Mayor of Changzhi; 2003–2008	Succeeded by Zhang Bao
Party political offices
Preceded by Zhang Bingsheng	Communist Party Secretary of Changzhi; 2008–2011	Succeeded by Tian Xirong
Preceded by Nie Chunyu	Communist Party Secretary of Lüliang; 2011–2012	Succeeded by Gao Weidong
Preceded by Li Zhengwen	Secretary General of Shanxi Provincial Committee of the Chinese Communist Party; 2012–2013	Succeeded by Nie Chunyu
