= Wang Maoshe =

Chinese politician

- 王茂设

Communist Party Secretary of Yuncheng
- In office February 2013 – June 2014
- Preceded by: Bai Yun
- Succeeded by: Wang Yuyan

Communist Party Secretary of Shuozhou
- In office February 2011 – February 2013
- Preceded by: Tian Xirong
- Succeeded by: Wang Anpang

Mayor of Jincheng
- In office April 2008 – January 2011
- Preceded by: Xia Zhengui
- Succeeded by: Wang Qingxian

Personal details
- Born: August 1957 (age 69) Anze County, Shanxi, China
- Party: Chinese Communist Party
- Education: Shanxi Agricultural University

Wang Maoshe (simplified Chinese: 王茂设; traditional Chinese: 王茂設; pinyin: Wāng Màoshè; born August 1957) is a former Chinese politician who served as the Communist Party Secretary of Yuncheng, a city in Shanxi province, between 2013 and 2014, and prior to that, party chief of Shuozhou. He was investigated for corruption and was expelled from the Chinese Communist Party in 2015.

== Career ==
Wang was born and raised in the town of Hechuan of Anze County, Shanxi Province. He graduated from Shanxi Agricultural University.

Wang joined the workforce in July 1975, and joined the Chinese Communist Party in April 1982.

In December 2007, Wang was appointed the Deputy Party Secretary and Vice-Mayor of Jincheng, he was promoted to become the Mayor of Jincheng in April 2008. In February 2011, Wang was transferred to Shuozhou as the CPC Party Chief, a position he held until February 2013, when he was transferred laterally to become the party chief of Yuncheng.

Wang was a member of the 11th National People's Congress. Chinese media reported that Wang had close relations with two officials: Ling Zhengce and Du Shanxue.

== Downfall ==
On June 4, 2014, it was announced that Wang was as being investigated by the Central Commission for Discipline Inspection for "serious violations of laws and regulations".

After Wang was sacked, the party chief position in the city of Yuncheng, one of the "corruption disaster zones", was not filled for over a year, the longest such vacancy for any municipal party chief since the anti-corruption campaign began in 2012. He was succeeded by Henan native Wang Yuyan in August 2015. In the same month, Wang was expelled from the Communist Party; the report of his wrongdoing was authored by the Shanxi Commission for Discipline Inspection. He was accused of "vote-buying", adultery, taking bribes, and "continuing to take bribes after the 18th Party Congress".

On January 6, 2017, he was sentenced to 15 years and fined 5 million yuan for taking bribes by the Xuzhou Intermediate People's Court in Jiangsu. According to the indictment, he used his various positions between 2011 and 2014 in Shuozhou and Yuncheng to seek benefits for relevant organizations and individuals in job promotion, job adjustment and enterprise management. In return, he accepted money and property worth over 52.35 million yuan ($8.09 million) personally or through his relatives.

Government offices
Preceded by Xia Zhengui	Mayor of Jincheng; 2008–2011	Succeeded by Wang Qingxian
Party political offices
Preceded by Tian Xirong	Communist Party Secretary of Shuozhou; 2011–2013	Succeeded by Wang Anpang
Previous: Bai Yun	Communist Party Secretary of Yuncheng; 2013–2014	Next: Wang Yuyan
