= Yu County, Shanxi =

Yu County 盂县
- County
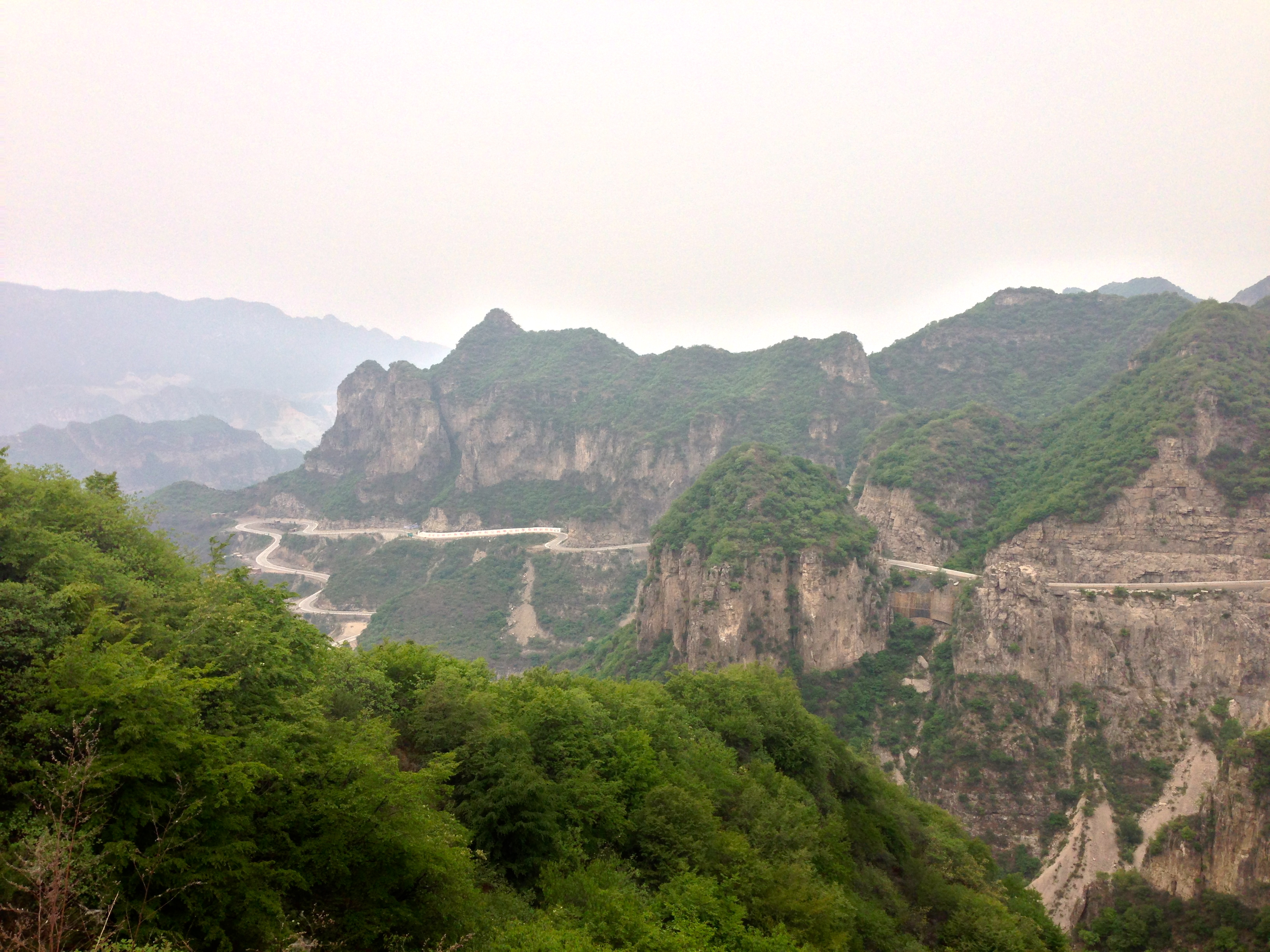

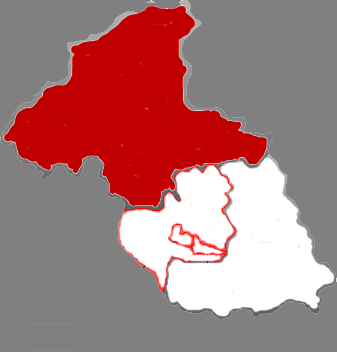
- Yu County in Yangquan

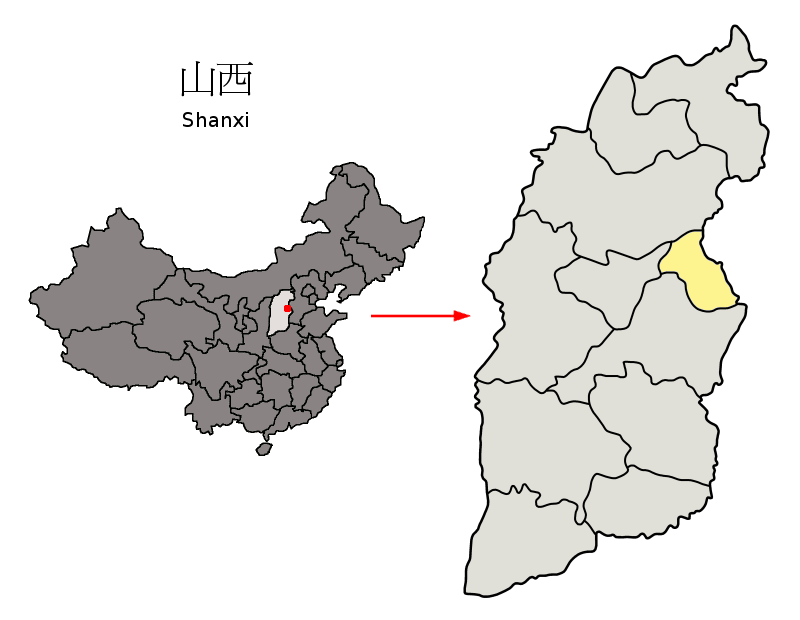
- Yangquan in Shanxi
- Coordinates: 38°05′08″N 113°24′44″E
- Country: People's Republic of China
- Province: Shanxi
- Prefecture-level city: Yangquan
- Time zone: UTC+8 (China Standard)

Yu County, Shanxi
- Traditional Chinese: 盂縣
- Simplified Chinese: 盂县
Transcriptions
Standard Mandarin
- Hanyu Pinyin: Yú Xiàn
- Wade–Giles: Yü Hsien

Yu County, also known by its Chinese name Yuxian, is a county in the east of Shanxi Province, China. It is under the administration of the prefecture-level city of Yangquan and occupies its northern majority.

== Name ==
Yu County's name refers to its cup-like shape.

== History ==
Yu County was settled by the Spring and Autumn period, when it formed an independent kingdom.

== Climate ==
Climate data for Yuxian, elevation 953 m (3,127 ft), (1991–2020 normals, extremes 1981–2010)
Month	Jan	Feb	Mar	Apr	May	Jun	Jul	Aug	Sep	Oct	Nov	Dec	Year
Record high °C (°F)	15.8 (60.4)	21.3 (70.3)	27.8 (82.0)	36.0 (96.8)	35.9 (96.6)	40.9 (105.6)	39.9 (103.8)	34.7 (94.5)	35.8 (96.4)	28.6 (83.5)	24.3 (75.7)	15.8 (60.4)	40.9 (105.6)
Mean daily maximum °C (°F)	1.9 (35.4)	5.2 (41.4)	11.5 (52.7)	18.8 (65.8)	24.5 (76.1)	28.1 (82.6)	28.6 (83.5)	27.0 (80.6)	22.9 (73.2)	17.2 (63.0)	9.6 (49.3)	3.3 (37.9)	16.6 (61.8)
Daily mean °C (°F)	−5.2 (22.6)	−2.2 (28.0)	3.9 (39.0)	11.3 (52.3)	17.4 (63.3)	21.1 (70.0)	22.6 (72.7)	21.0 (69.8)	16.1 (61.0)	9.9 (49.8)	2.7 (36.9)	−3.3 (26.1)	9.6 (49.3)
Mean daily minimum °C (°F)	−10.5 (13.1)	−7.7 (18.1)	−2.1 (28.2)	4.7 (40.5)	10.5 (50.9)	15.0 (59.0)	17.9 (64.2)	16.6 (61.9)	11.1 (52.0)	4.4 (39.9)	−2.4 (27.7)	−8.1 (17.4)	4.1 (39.4)
Record low °C (°F)	−19.8 (−3.6)	−19.3 (−2.7)	−15.3 (4.5)	−6.4 (20.5)	0.2 (32.4)	6.8 (44.2)	10.8 (51.4)	7.2 (45.0)	0.0 (32.0)	−7.3 (18.9)	−16.7 (1.9)	−21.0 (−5.8)	−21.0 (−5.8)
Average precipitation mm (inches)	3.7 (0.15)	5.6 (0.22)	10.5 (0.41)	27.7 (1.09)	39.8 (1.57)	71.7 (2.82)	133.3 (5.25)	123.9 (4.88)	71.4 (2.81)	33.3 (1.31)	13.4 (0.53)	2.8 (0.11)	537.1 (21.15)
Average precipitation days (≥ 0.1 mm)	2.4	3.0	3.9	5.9	7.4	11.4	14.0	12.3	8.8	6.4	3.7	2.1	81.3
Average snowy days	3.4	4.4	3.4	1.3	0	0	0	0	0	0.2	2.8	3.3	18.8
Average relative humidity (%)	45	46	43	44	47	58	72	75	71	61	53	46	55
Mean monthly sunshine hours	198.0	190.8	231.2	250.8	278.1	242.3	219.6	215.3	207.2	213.0	196.5	198.4	2,641.2
Percentage possible sunshine	65	62	62	63	63	55	49	52	56	62	66	67	60
Source: China Meteorological Administration

== Economy ==
It is best known for its production of black pepper and coal.

In 2005, the county's GDP was approximately 3.0 billion rmb, with 600 million rmb in taxes. The GDP per capita was equal to 3,646 yuan income for farmers and the total retail sales of consumer goods has reached 970 million yuan. Furthermore, there is 100 million kg of crop output and 10.71 million tons of coal production.

== Transportation ==
The county is served by Yangquan North railway station on the Shijiazhuang–Taiyuan high-speed railway.

== Tourist attraction ==
- Cangshan Temple (藏山祠)

== Geographical facts ==
- Area: 2,442 km^{2} (943 sq mi)
- population: 300,000
- Distance from Taiyuan: 100 km (62 mi)
