= Wang Yuyan =

Chinese politician

Wang Yuyan (Chinese: 王宇燕; born May 1966) is a Chinese politician serving as head of the Organization Department of the Qinghai organization of the Chinese Communist Party. Wang was born in Xiangcheng County, Henan province. She joined the Chinese Communist Party in 1986. In 2008, she became party chief of Xiangcheng City (county-level), in December 2011, she was named deputy party chief of Jiyuan, then acting mayor (Jiyuan is a county-level division directly governed by the province; when Wang served here, she was considered an official of full prefecture-level rank). In March 2015 she was named party chief of Jiyuan. On July 31, 2015, she was named party chief of Yuncheng. In May 2017, Wang was transferred to Qinghai to serve on the provincial party standing committee and as the head of the party organization department there.

Party political offices
Previous: Wang Maoshe	Communist Party Secretary of Yuncheng; 2015–2017	Next: Liu Zhihong
