= Shanxi Normal University =

University in Linfen, Shanxi, China

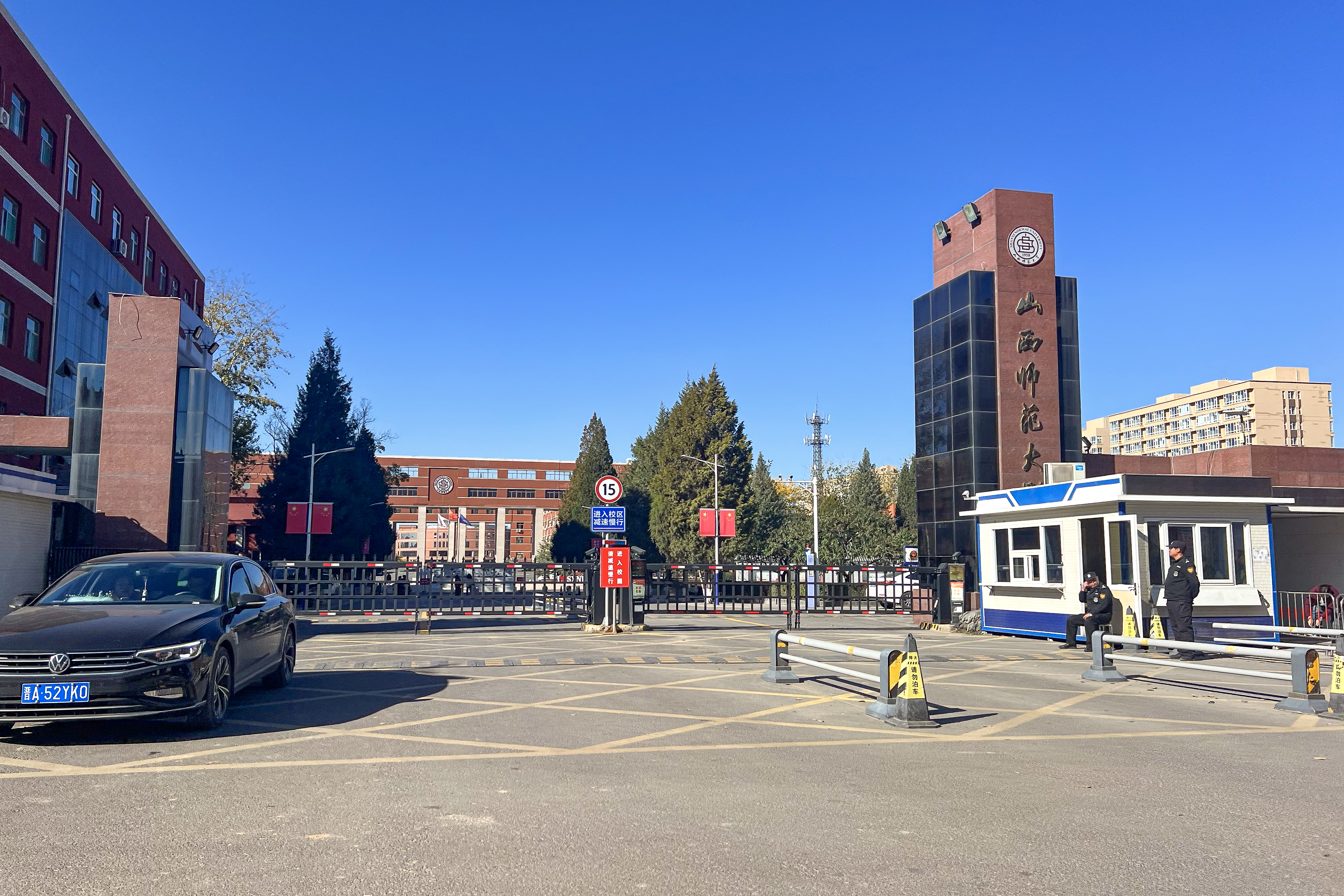
Taiyuan campus

Shanxi Normal University (Chinese: 山西师范大学) is a Chinese university in Linfen, Shanxi. It was founded as a teacher training school in 1958; then, promoted and renamed to Shanxi Normal University in 1984.

Shanxi Normal University has 21,205 undergraduate and 4,128 graduate students on three campuses. With 21 departments, students study in economics, philosophy, the science of law, literature, history, science, engineering and other disciplines.

== History ==
Shanxi Normal University is one of the five oldest universities in Shanxi Province. In 1958 Shanxi Normal University began as a teacher training school, responsible for training teachers throughout the south of Shanxi. After the regulation of the higher education system in 1962, it became the only higher-level teacher training school in the province. In 1964, through collaboration with various departments of Shanxi University it officially became Shanxi Teachers College. In 1984, it upgraded to a university through the endorsement of the State Education Commission of China. The Shanxi Provincial government decided in 1999 to make the Shanxi Normal University Sports College and the Shanxi Vocational Teachers College part of Shanxi Normal University.

== Criticism ==
In 2020, the university was criticized in Chinese media for refusing to provide a braille entrance exam for a prospective blind student.

== Facilities ==
The university has a herbarium with 20,000 specimens founded in 1963 and was recognized in the Global Registry of Scientific Collections.
