= Yangquan =

Yangquan 阳泉市 Yangchuan
- Prefecture-level city
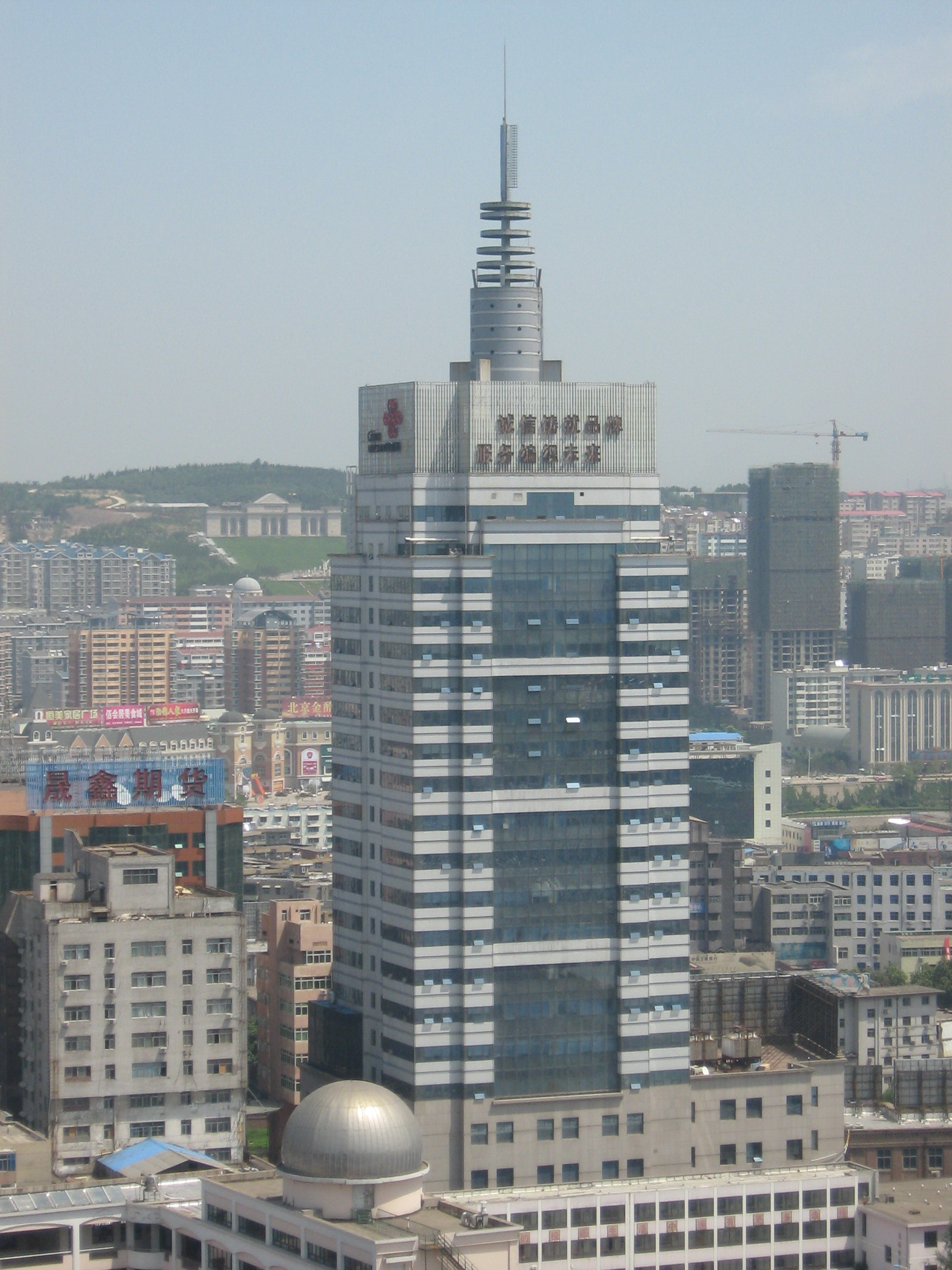

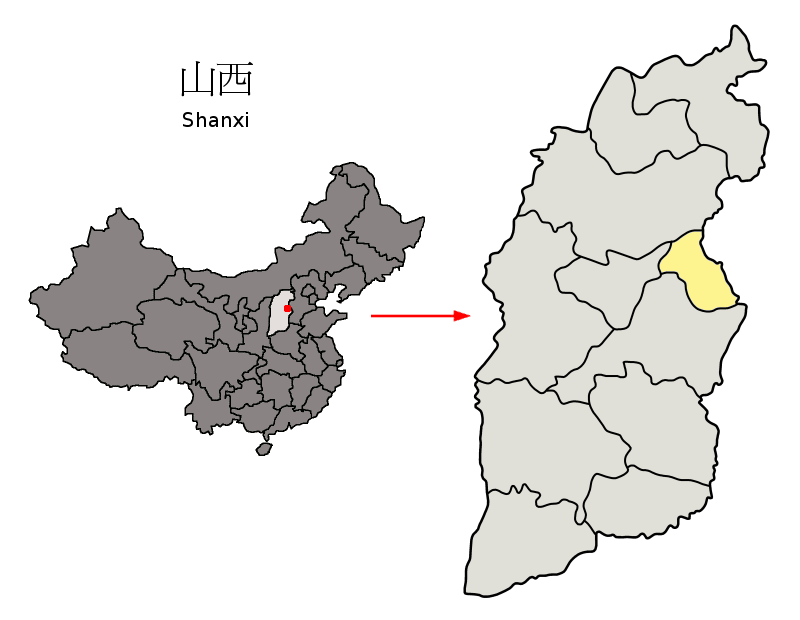
- Location of Yangquan City jurisdiction in Shanxi

- Location of the city centre in Shanxi
- Coordinates (Yangquan municipal government): 37°51′26″N 113°34′49″E
- Country: People's Republic of China
- Province: Shanxi
- Districts: 3
- Counties: 2
- Incorporated (prefecture): 1952
- Municipal seat: Chengqu

Area
  - Prefecture-level city: 4,563 km^{2} (1,762 sq mi)
  - Urban: 656.9 km^{2} (253.6 sq mi)
  - Metro: 2,053.9 km^{2} (793.0 sq mi)

Population (2020 census)
  - Prefecture-level city: 1,368,502
  - Density: 299.9/km^{2} (776.8/sq mi)
  - Urban: 731,228
  - Urban density: 1,113/km^{2} (2,883/sq mi)
  - Metro: 1,037,456
  - Metro density: 505.12/km^{2} (1,308.2/sq mi)

GDP
  - Prefecture-level city: CN¥ 72.4 billion US$ 11.7 billion
  - Per capita: CN¥ 54,237; US$ 8,678
- Time zone: UTC+8 (China Standard)
- Postal code: 045000
- Area code: 0353
- ISO 3166 code: CN-SX-03
- License Plate Prefix: 晋C
- Administrative division code: 140300
- Website: yq.gov.cn

Yangquan (simplified Chinese: 阳泉; traditional Chinese: 陽泉; pinyin: Yángquán [jǎŋtɕʰyǎn]) is a prefecture-level city in the east of Shanxi province, China, bordering Hebei province to the east. Known as "Rippling Spring" in ancient times, it lies on the eastern edge of the Loess Plateau and the western side of the Taihang Mountains. Yangquan occupies a total area of 4,452 square kilometres (1,719 sq mi). According to the 2020 census, Yangquan had a population of 1,318,505, of which 1,037,456 lived in the built-up (or metro) area consists of 3 urban districts plus Pingding County. Yangquan is a new industrial city in Shanxi province. It belongs to the warm temperate semi-humid continental monsoon climate zone. Yangquan City covers two counties and three districts.

== Administrative divisions ==
Map
Name	Hanzi	Pinyin	Meaning	Population (2010 Census)	Area (km^{2})	Density (/km^{2})
Cheng District	城区	Chéngqū	Urban District	193,106	19	10,163
Kuang District	矿区	Kuàngqū	Mining District	242,994	10	24,299
Jiao District	郊区	Jiāoqū	Suburban District	286,055	633	452
Pingding County	平定县	Píngdìng Xiàn		335,265	1,350	248
Yu County	盂县	Yù Xiàn		311,082	2,439	128

== Geography and climate ==
Yangquan has a rather dry, monsoon-influenced humid continental climate /semi-arid climate (Köppen Dwa/BSk), with cold and very dry winters, and hot, somewhat humid summers. The monthly average 24-hour temperature ranges from −3.2 °C (26.2 °F) in January to 24.3 °C (75.7 °F) in July, and the annual average is 11.5 °C (52.7 °F). The diurnal temperature variation, which does not exceed 13 °C (23 °F) in any month, is not large by provincial standards. More than 70% of the annual rainfall, which ranges from 450 to 550 millimetres (18 to 22 in) throughout the entire city, falls in the months from June to September; sunshine totals 2700–2900 hours annually throughout the city, and the frost-free period lasts 130–180 days.

Climate data for Yangquan, elevation 767 m (2,516 ft), (1991–2020 normals, extremes 1971–2010)
Month	Jan	Feb	Mar	Apr	May	Jun	Jul	Aug	Sep	Oct	Nov	Dec	Year
Record high °C (°F)	16.3 (61.3)	24.2 (75.6)	29.9 (85.8)	36.9 (98.4)	37.8 (100.0)	41.7 (107.1)	41.5 (106.7)	37.6 (99.7)	37.6 (99.7)	30.1 (86.2)	26.3 (79.3)	16.9 (62.4)	41.7 (107.1)
Mean daily maximum °C (°F)	2.8 (37.0)	6.4 (43.5)	12.9 (55.2)	20.3 (68.5)	25.8 (78.4)	29.3 (84.7)	29.9 (85.8)	28.2 (82.8)	24.1 (75.4)	18.5 (65.3)	10.7 (51.3)	4.3 (39.7)	17.8 (64.0)
Daily mean °C (°F)	−3.2 (26.2)	−0.2 (31.6)	6.0 (42.8)	13.2 (55.8)	19.1 (66.4)	22.8 (73.0)	24.2 (75.6)	22.6 (72.7)	17.9 (64.2)	12.0 (53.6)	4.6 (40.3)	−1.4 (29.5)	11.5 (52.6)
Mean daily minimum °C (°F)	−7.5 (18.5)	−4.8 (23.4)	0.8 (33.4)	7.4 (45.3)	13.1 (55.6)	17.3 (63.1)	19.8 (67.6)	18.5 (65.3)	13.3 (55.9)	7.1 (44.8)	0.2 (32.4)	−5.4 (22.3)	6.6 (44.0)
Record low °C (°F)	−17.5 (0.5)	−15.4 (4.3)	−12.6 (9.3)	−2.5 (27.5)	3.0 (37.4)	8.2 (46.8)	13.1 (55.6)	9.8 (49.6)	3.8 (38.8)	−4.3 (24.3)	−12.3 (9.9)	−15.8 (3.6)	−17.5 (0.5)
Average precipitation mm (inches)	3.8 (0.15)	5.7 (0.22)	10.3 (0.41)	26.7 (1.05)	41.5 (1.63)	67.4 (2.65)	133.5 (5.26)	116.7 (4.59)	66.8 (2.63)	31.6 (1.24)	14.7 (0.58)	3.0 (0.12)	521.7 (20.53)
Average precipitation days (≥ 0.1 mm)	2.5	2.9	3.5	6.1	7.1	10.8	13.7	12.0	9.1	5.9	3.9	2.0	79.5
Average snowy days	4.0	4.3	2.8	0.8	0	0	0	0	0	0.2	2.5	3.4	18
Average relative humidity (%)	46	46	42	44	47	56	70	74	68	59	51	45	54
Mean monthly sunshine hours	182.8	176.5	215.1	232.9	252.6	225.7	199.0	191.8	192.2	198.3	182.7	181.3	2,430.9
Percentage possible sunshine	60	57	58	59	57	51	45	46	52	58	61	61	55
Source 1: China Meteorological Administration
Source 2: Weather China

=== Location ===
Yangquan is located on the west side of the central Taihang Mountains, it is bounded by Xinzhou's Dingxiang County and Wutai County in the north, Shijiazhuang's Pingshan County and Jingjing County in the east, Jinzhong's Xiyang County in the south, and Jinzhong's Shouyang County and Taiyuan's Yangqu County in the west. It is about 106 km long from north to south and about 42 km wide from east to west. The city has a total area of 4,559 square kilometres.

=== Topography ===
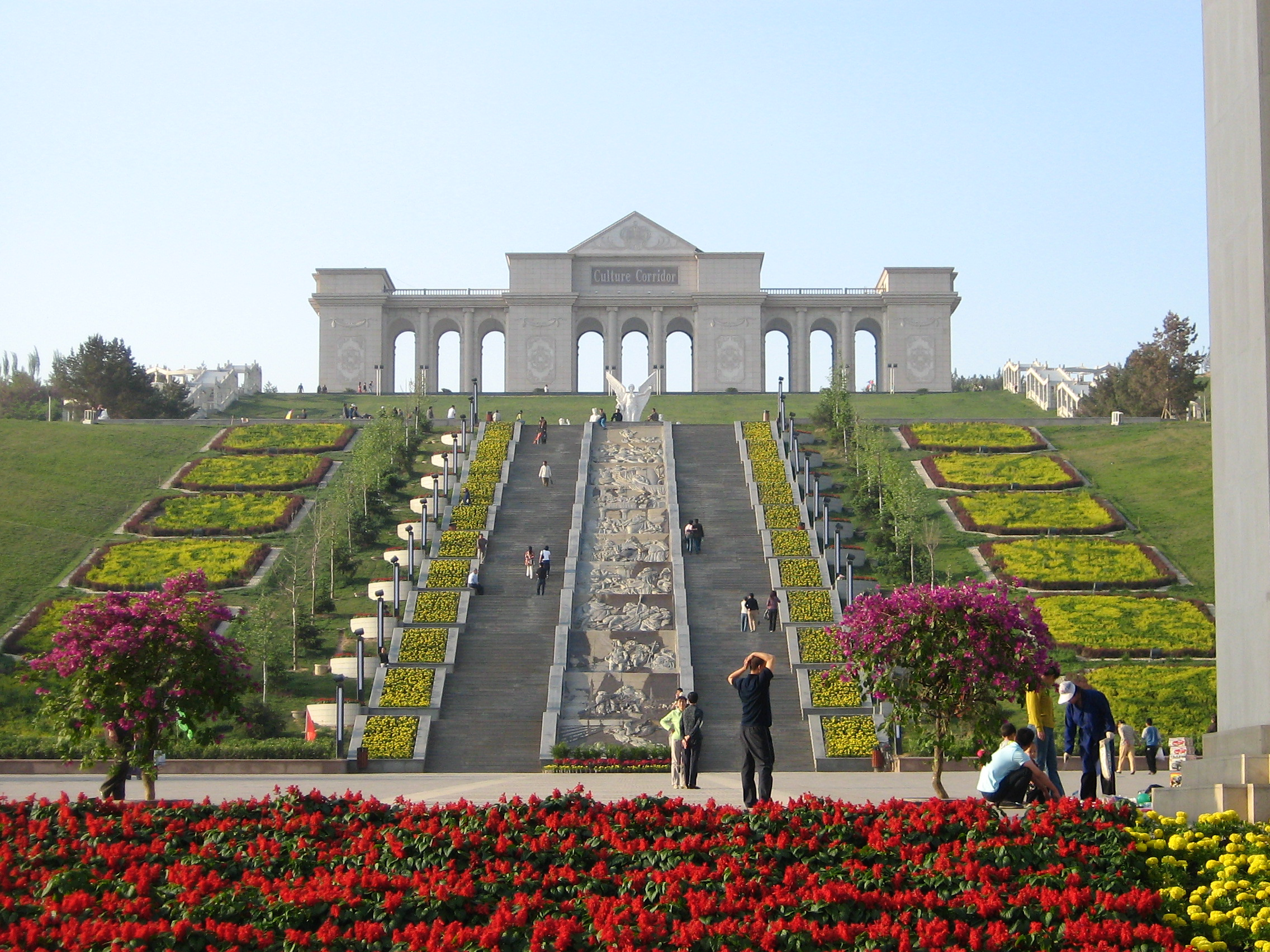
Beishan Park

Yangquan lies on the eastern edge of the Loess Plateau and belongs to the mountainous region of eastern Shanxi. The landscape is mainly mountainous, with the rest being hills and plains. The mountains include nine mountain ranges. Between the mountain ranges, there are a number of basins. The Taihang Mountains are the boundary mountains between Hebei and Shanxi Province.

=== Hydrology ===
There are more than 60 rivers in Yangquan, 7 of which have a drainage area of more than 300 square kilometres and a river length of more than 30 kilometres, all of which belong to the Hai River system. The Hutuo River and the Mian River are the major rivers in the area.

== History ==
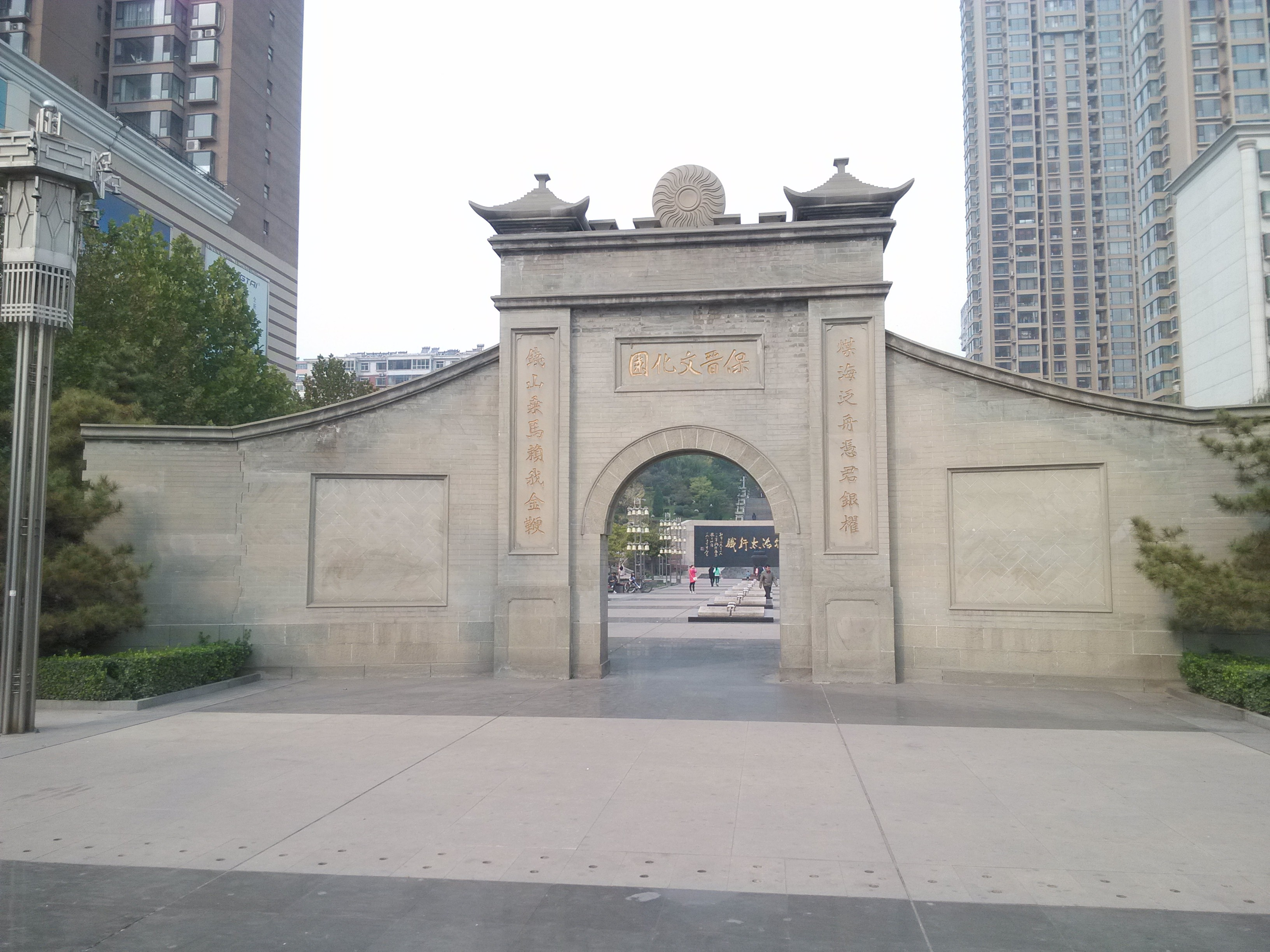
Baojin Park

Yangquan City was founded as part of the original Pingding County of the early Republic of China on 4 May 1947. It was later renamed Yangquan Industrial and Mining Zone. Yangquan City (Industrial and Mining Zone) has been under the jurisdiction of the Jin-Cha-Ji Border Region government, the North China People's Government and Shanxi Province.

After the founding of the People's Republic of China, Yangquan regained its municipality in 1952 and was for several times placed under the jurisdiction of Yuci Prefecture and Jinzhong Prefecture.

In September 1983, Pingding County and Yu County were transferred to Yangquan City, Yangquan City became a city directly under the jurisdiction of Shanxi Province.

== Natural resources ==
=== Water ===
The total water resources of Yangquan are 1.48 billion cubic metres per year. Niangziguan Spring in the east is the main source of water for industrial and residential use. Yangquan has a daily water supply capacity of 200,000 cubic metres per day, and the actual demand is about 100,000 cubic metres per day. The local per capita water resources are only 562 cubic metres per year, slightly higher than the per capita water resources of Shanxi Province of 546 cubic metres per year, less than 1/4 of the national per capita water resources of 2,400 cubic metres per year, and only 1/8 of the world's per capita water resources.

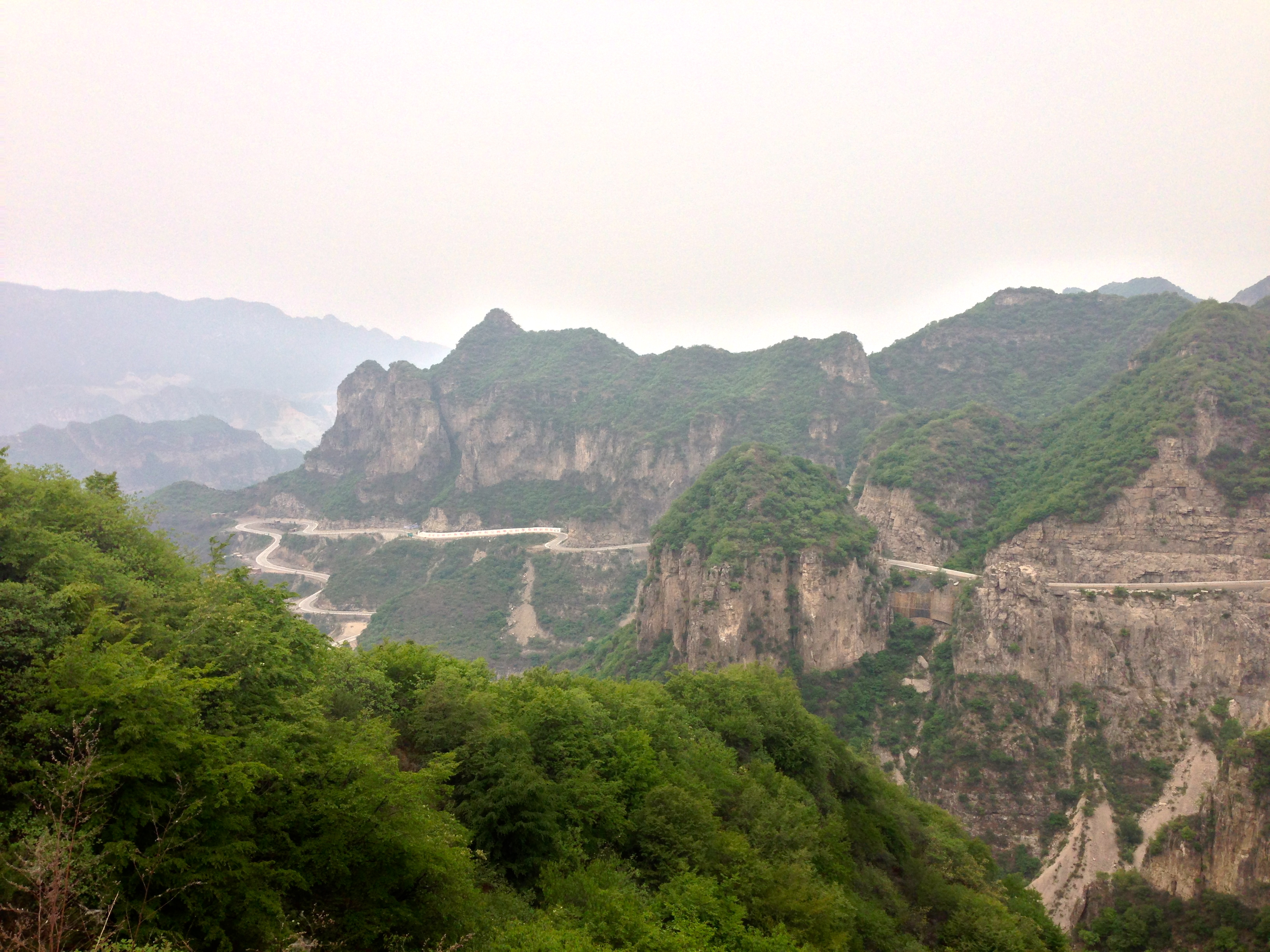
Yuxian

=== Flora ===
There are 93 families and 437 species of common plants in Yangquan. There are more than 160 species of plants that can be used for medicinal purposes, as well as a variety of grain crops, oil crops and vegetable crops. There are 941,000 mu (62,733 hectares (155,020 acres)) of forest in Yangquan, accounting for 13.74% of the total area of the city, and there are 22.05 million green trees; the total timber volume is 550,000 cubic metres. There are 1.821 million mu (121,400 hectares (300,000 acres)) of pasture land in the area, of which more than 90% is usable pasture land.

=== Fauna ===
The wildlife resources in Yangquan are few due to the lack of forests and severe pollution. However, there are many insect species in Yangquan, with 831 known forest pests and some beneficial insects.

=== Mineral resources ===
Yangquan is an important mineral concentration area in China with rich mineral resources and is known as the "hometown of coal and iron". There are as many as 52 proven mineral deposits, especially anthracite, pyrite and bauxite, which are famous for their large reserves, high quality and easy mining.

The geological reserves of coal in the territory are 10.4 billion tonnes, pyrite - 250 million tonnes and bauxite - 227 million tonnes.

== Economy ==
In 2023, Yangquan achieved a regional GDP of 100.27 billion yuan, an increase of 3.2% at comparable prices. The composition of primary, secondary and tertiary industries was 1.8%, 53.3% and 44.9% respectively. The GDP per capita is 76,830 yuan, which is equivalent to 10,903 US dollars based on the average exchange rate in 2023. The annual per capita disposable income is 34,010 yuan.

=== Primary sector ===
In 2023, the total output value of agriculture, forestry, animal husbandry and fishery in the city is 3.01 billion yuan. The city produces 238,300 tons of grain, 24,000 tons of meat, 38,000 tons of eggs, 5,000 tons of milk, and 75,000 tons of vegetables and mushrooms.

=== Secondary sector ===
In 2023, the city's total industrial added value was 49.38 billion yuan, and industrial enterprises above designated size achieved operating income of 80.63 billion yuan. The construction industry achieved an added value of 4.1 billion yuan throughout the year, with a construction area of 2.213 million square meters and a completed area of 449,000 square meters.

The city produced 67.617 million tons of raw coal, 26.737 million tons of washed coal, it has 8.555 million kilowatts of installed power generation capacity, and 10.15 billion kilowatt-hours of total social electricity consumption in 2023.

=== Tertiary sector ===
In 2023, the service industry added 45.03 billion yuan, with real estate adding 5.97 billion yuan. Railway freight was 35 million tons, while road transport was 48.8 million tons.

== Transportation ==
Yangquan is about 140 kilometers from Shijiazhuang and 100 kilometers from Taiyuan. In 2016, the Yangquan Terminal of Taiyuan Wusu International Airport opened, offering ticket sales and airport shuttles. In 2017, the Yangquan Terminal of Shijiazhuang Zhengding International Airport opened, offering ticket sales and airport shuttles.

The Shijiazhuang–Taiyuan railway runs through downtown Yangquan. In 2009, Yangquan North railway station on the Shijiazhuang–Taiyuan high-speed railway was opened in Yu County. In 2020, the newly built Yangquan East railway station opened, it's connected to Yangquan North station via the Yangquan–Dazhai railway, making travel more convenient for the urban residents.

G20 Qingdao–Yinchuan Expressway, China National Highway 307, China National Highway 207, and China National Highway 239 pass through Yangquan.

== Local Specialty ==
Yangquan is known for its walnut and walnut oil, pepper, dried cucumber, coal carving, casserole, and vinegar.

== Attractions ==
- Niangziguan Pass: "the Ninth Pass on the Great wall"
- Guanwang Temple
- Monument to the Hundred-Regiment Campaign
- Yaolin Temple
- Northern Wei Grottoes
- Liangjiazhai Hot Spring
- Niangziguan Waterfall
- Cangshan Mountain
- Dawang Temple
- Fujun Temple
- Potou Taishan Mountain Temple
- Kaihe Temple
- Tining Temple Twin Towers

== Notable people ==
- Co-founder of Baidu; Robin Li (李彦宏) was born and raised in Yangquan.
- Author of The Three-Body Problem; Liu Cixin (刘慈欣) was born and raised in Yangquan.

== Twinned cities ==
- Chesterfield, Derbyshire, England, United Kingdom
- Mount Vernon, New York, United States
