= Pei Jinjia =

Chinese politician

- 裴金佳
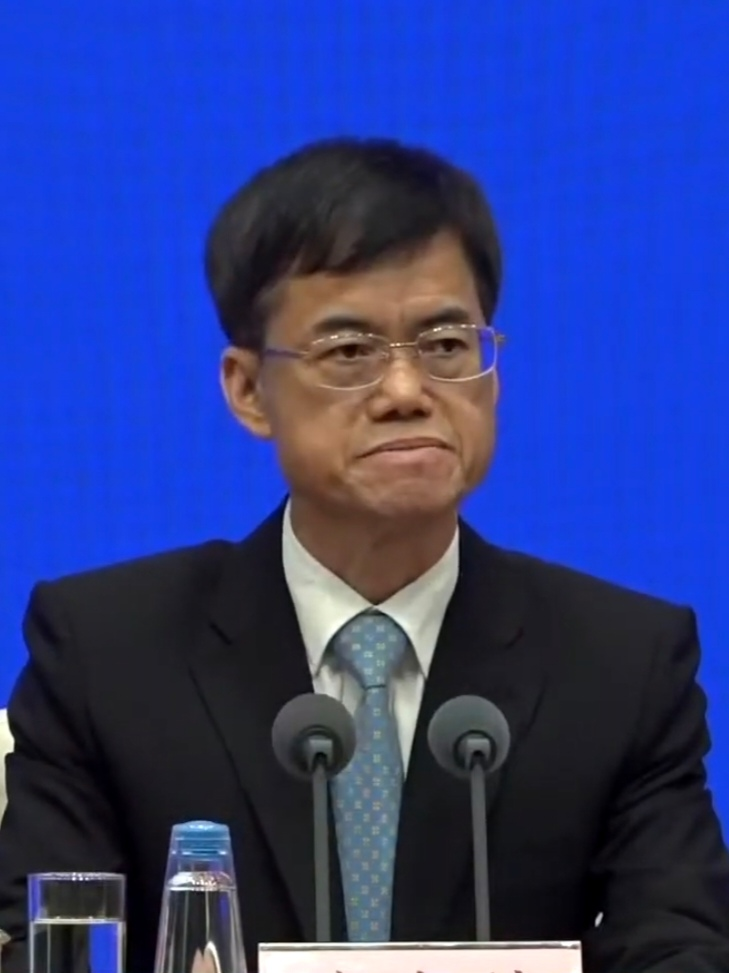
- Pei in 2023

Minister of Veterans Affairs
- Incumbent
- Assumed office 24 June 2022
- Premier: Li Keqiang; Li Qiang
- Preceded by: Sun Shaocheng

Personal details
- Born: August 1963 (age 63) Anxi County, Fujian, China
- Party: Chinese Communist Party
- Education: Jimei University; Central Party School of the Chinese Communist Party

Pei Jinjia (Chinese: 裴金佳; pinyin: Péi Jīnjiā; born August 1963) is a Chinese politician and the current minister of veterans affairs, in office since June 2022.

He was a representative of the 18th and 19th National Congress of the Chinese Communist Party. He was an alternate of the 19th Central Committee of the Chinese Communist Party.

== Biography ==
Pei was born in Anxi County, Fujian, in August 1963. In 1982, he entered Jimei Finance and Economics School (now Jimei University), majoring in finance and accounting.

=== Fujian ===
After graduating in 1984, he was assigned as an official in Xiamen Finance Bureau. He joined the Chinese Communist Party (CCP) in December 1990. He served as deputy director of Kaiyuan District Finance Bureau in December 1990, and four years later promoted to the director position. In January 1994, he was appointed deputy governor of Kaiyuan District, rising to governor in January 1999. In September 2003, he was made party secretary of Siming District, his first foray into a district leadership role. He was chosen as vice mayor of Xiamen in May 2006.

He became mayor of Nanping in October 2010, and then party secretary, the top political position in the city, beginning in December 2011.

He served as mayor of Xiamen from February 2015 to September 2016, and party secretary, from September 2016 to November 2018. In November 2016, he was admitted to member of the Standing Committee of the CCP Fujian Provincial Committee, the province's top authority.

=== Beijing ===
He was appointed deputy director of the Taiwan Affairs Office of the State Council in November 2018, concurrently serving as secretary of its Party Committee since November 2019.

He was chosen as party branch secretary of the Ministry of Veterans Affairs in April 2022, concurrently holding the minister position. He also serves as deputy director of the Office of the Central Integrated Military and Civilian Development Commission.

Government offices
Preceded by Gong Qinggai	Mayor of Nanping; 2010–2012	Succeeded by Lin Baojin
Preceded by Liu Keqing	Mayor of Xiamen; 2015–2016	Succeeded by Zhuang Jiahan
Preceded by Sun Shaocheng	Minister of Veterans Affairs; 2022–present	Incumbent
Party political offices
Preceded by Lei Chunmei	Party Secretary of Nanping; 2012–2015	Succeeded by Zhuang Jiahan
Preceded by Wang Menghui	Party Secretary of Xiamen; 2016–2018	Succeeded by Hu Changsheng
