= Sun Shaocheng =

Chinese politician

- 孙绍骋
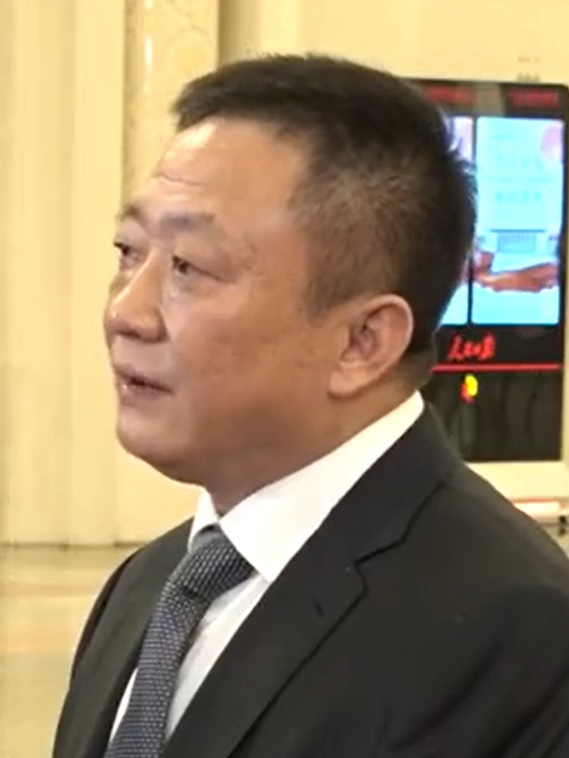
- Sun in 2019

Party Secretary of Inner Mongolia
- In office 30 April 2022 – 30 September 2025
- Deputy: Wang Lixia (chairwoman)
- Preceded by: Shi Taifeng
- Succeeded by: Wang Weizhong

Minister of Veterans Affairs
- In office 19 March 2018 – 24 June 2022
- Premier: Li Keqiang
- Preceded by: New title
- Succeeded by: Pei Jinjia

Vice Minister of Land and Resources
- In office June 2017 – March 2018
- Leader: Jiang Daming (minister)

Vice Minister of Civil Affairs
- In office February 2017 – June 2017
- Leader: Huang Shuxian (minister)

Vice Governor of Shanxi
- In office November 2016 – February 2017
- Governor: Lou Yangsheng

Vice Governor of Shandong
- In office August 2012 – September 2014
- Governor: Guo Shuqing

Personal details
- Born: July 1960 (age 66) Haiyang, Shandong, China
- Party: Chinese Communist Party (1986-2026, expelled)
- Education: Shandong University; Peking University; Central Party School of the Chinese Communist Party

Sun Shaocheng (simplified Chinese: 孙绍骋; traditional Chinese: 孫紹騁; pinyin: Sūn Shàochéng; born July 1960) is a Chinese politician. Previously, he served as party secretary of Inner Mongolia, Minister of Veterans Affairs, vice minister of Land and Resources, vice-minister of Civil Affairs, vice-governor of Shanxi, and vice-governor of Shandong. He served two separate terms as vice-minister of Ministry of Civil Affairs, from April 2009 to August 2012 and from February 2017 to June 2017. He served as a member of the 19th Central Committee of the Chinese Communist Party and the 19th National Congress of the Chinese Communist Party.

== Education ==
Sun was born in Haiyang, Shandong in July 1960. He entered Shandong University in August 1980, majoring in Chinese language and literature at the Department of Chinese language, where he graduated in July 1984. After graduation, he entered the workforce, and joined the Chinese Communist Party in May 1986. He earned his doctor's degree in the science of law from Peking University in 2002. He was also studied at the Central Party School of the Chinese Communist Party as a part-time student.

== Career ==
In July 1984, he was appointed as an official in the Ministry of Civil Affairs and over a period of 25 years worked his way up to the position of Vice-Minister.

In August 2012, he became the vice governor of Shandong, a position he held until September 2014. Then he was transferred to Shanxi, a province rich in coal resources, he was a Standing Committee of the CPC Shanxi Provincial Committee and director of its United Front Work Department. He was promoted to vice-governor of Shanxi in November 2016, but having held the position for only three months, he was transferred back to Beijing and appointed the vice-minister of Ministry of Civil Affairs again, but soon he was transferred to another post as vice-minister of Ministry of Land and Resources. On March 19, 2018, he was confirmed as the inaugural Minister of Veterans Affairs at the first session of the 13th National People's Congress.

On 30 April 2022, he was appointed party secretary of Inner Mongolia, the top political position in the region. On January 16, 2023, during the first session of the Fourteenth Inner Mongolia Autonomous Regional People's Congress, Sun Shaocheng was appointed Chairman of the Standing Committee of the Autonomous Region People's Congress.

== Downfall ==
On 29 January 2026, Sun was put under investigation for alleged "serious violations of discipline and laws" by the Central Commission for Discipline Inspection (CCDI), the party's internal disciplinary body, and the National Supervisory Commission, the highest anti-corruption agency of China. Sun's investigation came days after Vice Chairman Zhang Youxia was also put under investigation; state media had reported Sun had extensive working relations with Zhang and CMC Political Work Director Miao Hua when he had veterans affairs related work. Sun was expelled from the party and dismissed from public office on 9 September 2026. On 29 October 2026, the fifth plenary session of the 20th CCP Central Committee reviewed and approved the report of the CCDI on the "serious violations of discipline and law" by Sun and confirmed the Politburo decision to expel him from the CCP.

Party political offices
Preceded by Bai Yun	Head of the United Front Work Department of the Shanxi Provincial Committee of the Chinese Communist Party; 2014–2016	Succeeded by Lian Yimin
Preceded by Jiang Daming	Party Branch Secretary of the Ministry of Land and Resources; 2017–2018	Succeeded by Position revoked
Preceded by Shi Taifeng	Party Secretary of Inner Mongolia; 2022–2025	Succeeded by Wang Weizhong
Government offices
New title	Minister of Veterans Affairs; 2018–2022	Succeeded by Pei Jinjia
