= Zhang Bao =

Zhang Bao may refer to:

- Zhang Bao (張寶), a Yellow Turban rebel leader, Zhang Jue's brother
- Zhang Bao (張苞), Investigator of Shanyang Commandery
- Zhang Bao (張苞), General of the Household of Li Jue
- Zhang Bao (Shu Han) (張苞), son of Shu Han general Zhang Fei
- Zhang Baozai (Chinese: 張保仔), a naval colonel of Qing imperial navy, and former pirate
