= Yangquan–Dazhai railway =

Chinese railway way in Shanxi province

Yangquan–Dazhai railway 阳大铁路

Overview
- Status: Partially complete
- Locale: Shanxi
- Termini: Yangquan North; Dazhai

Service
- Type: High-speed rail
- Operator(s): China Railway

Technical
- Line length: 79 km (49 mi)
- Track gauge: 1,435 mm (4 ft 8 1/2 in) standard gauge
- Operating speed: 120 km/h (75 mph)

The Yangquan–Dazhai railway (Chinese: 阳大铁路) is a single-track electrified railway line in Shanxi, China. The section from Yangquan North to Yangquan East is newly constructed, whereas the section from Yangquan East to Dazhai is an upgrade of an existing railway. Services are operated using CRH6F-A units.

== History ==
The project began construction in March 2016. The section from Yangquan North to Yangquan East opened on 24 September 2020. This section is 37.9 kilometres (23.5 mi) long. Currently one intermediate station has been constructed, Hedi, but is yet to open.
