= Minister of Veterans Affairs (China) =

Minister of the People's Republic of China

Minister of Veterans Affairs of the People's Republic of China
- 中华人民共和国退役军人事务部部长
- National Emblem of China

- Flag of China

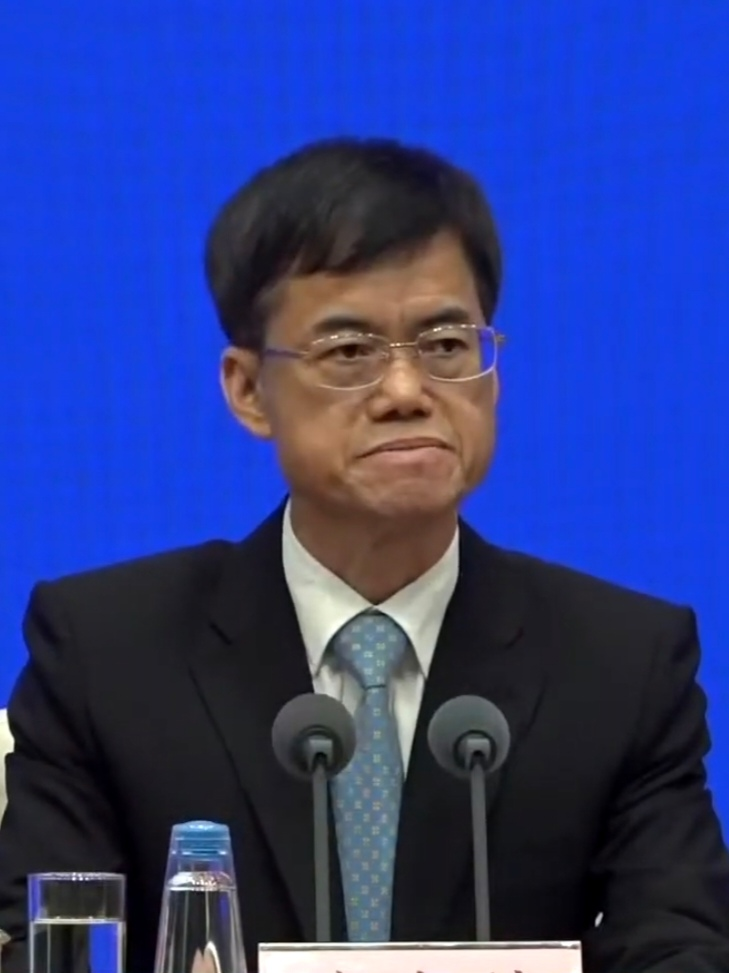
- Incumbent; Pei Jinjia since 24 June 2022
- Ministry of Veterans Affairs
- Status: Provincial and ministerial-level official
- Member of: Plenary Meeting of the State Council
- Seat: Ministry of Veterans Affairs Building, Xicheng District, Beijing
- Nominator: Premier (chosen within the Chinese Communist Party)
- Appointer: President with the confirmation of the National People's Congress or its Standing Committee
- Formation: 19 March 2018; 8 years ago
- First holder: Sun Shaocheng
- Deputy: Vice Minister of Veterans Affairs

The minister of veterans affairs of the People's Republic of China is the head of the Ministry of Veterans Affairs of the People's Republic of China and a member of the State Council. Within the State Council, the position is twenty-third in order of precedence. The minister is responsible for leading the ministry, presiding over its meetings, and signing important documents related to the ministry. Officially, the minister is nominated by the premier of the State Council, who is then approved by the National People's Congress or its Standing Committee and appointed by the president.

The current minister is Pei Jinjia, who concurrently serves as the Chinese Communist Party Committee Secretary of the ministry.

== List of ministers ==
No.	Name	Took office	Left office	Notes
1	Sun Shaocheng	March 19, 2018	June 24, 2022	
2	Pei Jinjia	June 24, 2022	incumbent	
