= Yangquan North railway station =

Railway station in Yangquan, China

Yangquanbei 阳泉北
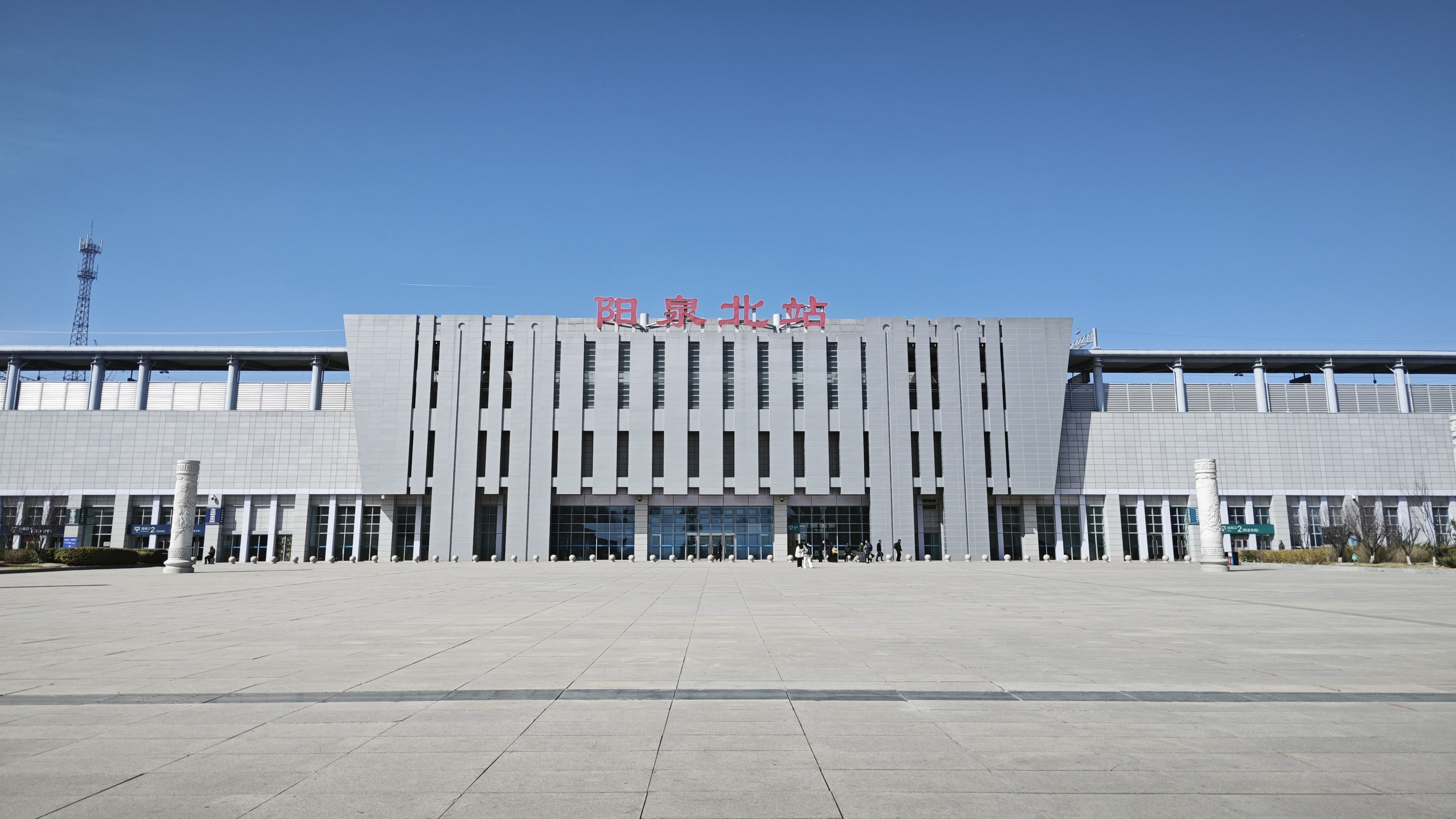

General information
- Location: Yu County, Yangquan, Shanxi Province; China
- Operated by: Beijing Railway Bureau
- Lines: Shijiazhuang–Taiyuan high-speed railway Yangquan–Dazhai railway
- Platforms: 2

Other information
- Station code: TMIS code: 26360; Telegraph code: YPP; Pinyin code: YQB
- Classification: Class 1 station

History
- Opened: 2009
Location

Yangquan North railway station is a railway station on the Shitai Passenger Railway, in Yu County, Yangquan, Shanxi Province, People's Republic of China.

The station is situated some distance away from downtown Yangquan. Yangquan North was expanded with the opening of the Yangquan–Dazhai railway on 24 September 2020, which provides a link to the new Yangquan East railway station, just north of the urban area.
