= Nie Chunyu =

Chinese politician

- 聂春玉

Secretary-General of the Shanxi Committee of the Chinese Communist Party
- In office February 2013 – August 2014
- Preceded by: Du Shanxue
- Succeeded by: Wang Weizhong

Head of the United Front Work Department of Shanxi Province
- In office January 2011 – February 2013
- Preceded by: Li Zhengyu
- Succeeded by: Bai Yun

Communist Party Secretary of Lüliang
- In office February 2006 – January 2011
- Preceded by: Guo Hailiang (郭海亮)
- Succeeded by: Du Shanxue

Mayor of Lüliang
- In office July 2004 – February 2006
- Preceded by: (City founded)
- Succeeded by: Dong Hongyun

Personal details
- Born: July 1955 (age 71) Houma, Shanxi, China
- Party: Chinese Communist Party (expelled)
- Education: Liaoning Technical University

Chinese name
- Traditional Chinese: 聶春玉
- Simplified Chinese: 聂春玉
Transcriptions
Standard Mandarin
- Hanyu Pinyin: Niè Chūnyù

Nie Chunyu (Chinese: 聂春玉; born July 1955) is a former Chinese politician from Shanxi province. He served on the province's party Standing Committee, and as the Secretary-General of the Party Committee, a position responsible for the coordination and execution of routine party work. Prior to that he served as the Head of the party's provincial United Front Work Department, and Party Secretary of Lüliang. He was removed from office in August 2014 along with several high-ranking colleagues, and placed under investigation for corruption by the party's anti-graft agency.

== Career ==
Nie was born and raised in Houma, Shanxi; he graduated from Liaoning Technical University, majoring in surveying.

He got involved in politics in October 1976 and joined the Chinese Communist Party in August 1973.

After college, he was assigned to Houma as local official. Beginning in 1984, he served in several posts in Shanxi, including division head, director, and party secretary.

In March 2004 he became the Deputy CPC Party Chief of Lüliang, rising to Party Chief in 2006. He also served as the mayor of Lüliang between July 2004 to February 2006. In January 2011, he was elevated to the head of the United Front Work Department of the provincial Party committee and became a Standing Committee member of the CPC Shanxi Committee. Two years later, he became secretary general of the standing committee.

== Downfall ==
On August 23, 2014, Nie Chunyu was being investigated by the Central Commission for Discipline Inspection for "serious violations of laws and regulations". On August 28, he was removed from office. The Central Commission for Discipline Inspection concluded on February 3, 2015, that Nie had "used the convenience of his office to seek gain for others and took a huge amount of bribes, took monetary and other gifts; and committed adultery." On October 19, 2016, Nie was sentenced to 15 years for guilty of bribery.

Government offices
New title	Mayor of Lüliang; 2004–2006	Succeeded by Dong Hongyun
Party political offices
Preceded by Guo Hailiang	Communist Party Secretary of Lüliang; 2006–2011	Succeeded by Du Shanxue
Preceded by Li Zhengyu	Head of the United Front Work Department of Shanxi Province; 2011–2013	Succeeded by Bai Yun
Preceded by Du Shanxue	Secretary-General of the Shanxi Committee of the Chinese Communist Party; 2013–2014	Succeeded by Wang Weizhong
