= Zhongyang County =

Coordinates: 37°21′26″N 111°10′47″E

Zhongyang County 中阳县 Chungyang
- County
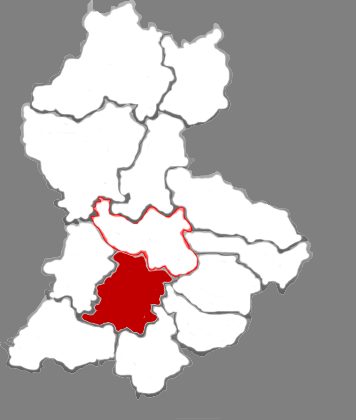
- Zhongyang in Lüliang

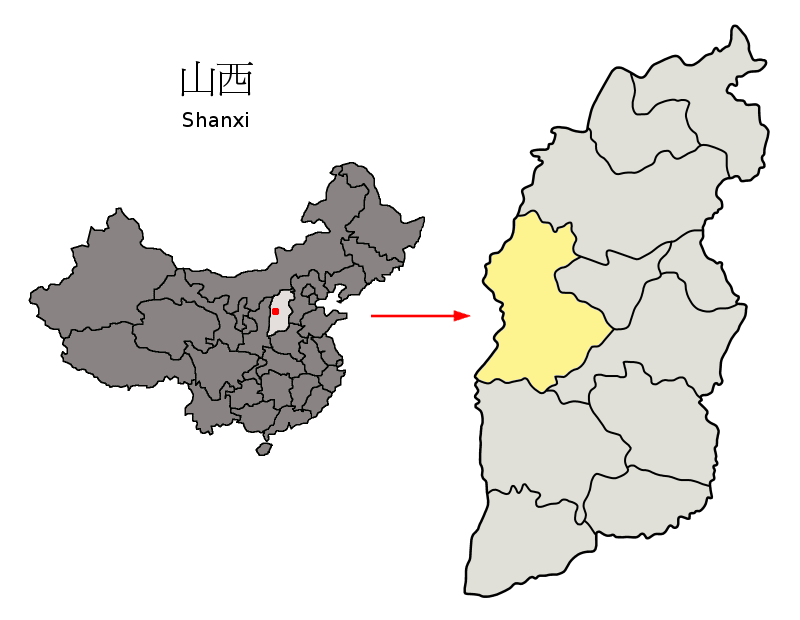
- Lüliang in Shanxi
- Country: People's Republic of China
- Province: Shanxi
- Prefecture-level city: Lüliang

Population (2020)
  - Total: 138,498
- Time zone: UTC+8 (China Standard)

Zhongyang County (simplified Chinese: 中阳县; traditional Chinese: 中陽縣; pinyin: Zhōngyáng Xiàn) is a county in the west of Shanxi province, China. It is under the administration of the prefecture-level city of Lüliang.

== Climate ==
Climate data for Zhongyang, elevation 1,213 m (3,980 ft), (1991–2020 normals, extremes 1981–2010)
Month	Jan	Feb	Mar	Apr	May	Jun	Jul	Aug	Sep	Oct	Nov	Dec	Year
Record high °C (°F)	13.1 (55.6)	21.6 (70.9)	25.8 (78.4)	33.2 (91.8)	34.3 (93.7)	37.3 (99.1)	37.9 (100.2)	34.8 (94.6)	35.2 (95.4)	27.8 (82.0)	22.3 (72.1)	15.9 (60.6)	37.9 (100.2)
Mean daily maximum °C (°F)	−0.8 (30.6)	3.7 (38.7)	10.4 (50.7)	17.9 (64.2)	23.3 (73.9)	27.3 (81.1)	28.3 (82.9)	26.2 (79.2)	21.5 (70.7)	15.3 (59.5)	7.7 (45.9)	0.5 (32.9)	15.1 (59.2)
Daily mean °C (°F)	−6.9 (19.6)	−2.7 (27.1)	3.7 (38.7)	10.7 (51.3)	16.2 (61.2)	20.4 (68.7)	22.2 (72.0)	20.3 (68.5)	15.2 (59.4)	8.7 (47.7)	1.6 (34.9)	−5.2 (22.6)	8.7 (47.6)
Mean daily minimum °C (°F)	−11.5 (11.3)	−7.6 (18.3)	−1.7 (28.9)	4.2 (39.6)	9.2 (48.6)	13.8 (56.8)	16.8 (62.2)	15.5 (59.9)	10.3 (50.5)	3.9 (39.0)	−2.8 (27.0)	−9.4 (15.1)	3.4 (38.1)
Record low °C (°F)	−24.9 (−12.8)	−21.9 (−7.4)	−17.8 (0.0)	−8.1 (17.4)	−1.3 (29.7)	4.8 (40.6)	8.8 (47.8)	7.6 (45.7)	−0.9 (30.4)	−8.5 (16.7)	−20.5 (−4.9)	−26.3 (−15.3)	−26.3 (−15.3)
Average precipitation mm (inches)	3.1 (0.12)	6.1 (0.24)	11.3 (0.44)	29.2 (1.15)	40.0 (1.57)	60.7 (2.39)	117.0 (4.61)	115.4 (4.54)	75.6 (2.98)	39.7 (1.56)	15.7 (0.62)	3.1 (0.12)	516.9 (20.34)
Average precipitation days (≥ 0.1 mm)	3.0	4.0	4.8	6.1	7.3	9.9	12.7	12.7	10.1	7.8	4.4	2.9	85.7
Average snowy days	4.1	5.0	3.4	0.9	0.1	0	0	0	0	0.3	3.1	3.6	20.5
Average relative humidity (%)	56	52	46	45	48	57	68	72	71	64	59	56	58
Mean monthly sunshine hours	195.6	185.0	224.0	246.1	272.6	254.2	234.0	220.2	201.0	205.8	192.8	195.1	2,626.4
Percentage possible sunshine	63	60	60	62	62	58	53	53	55	60	64	66	60
Source: China Meteorological Administration
