= Dai Prefecture =

Historical Chinese administrative division

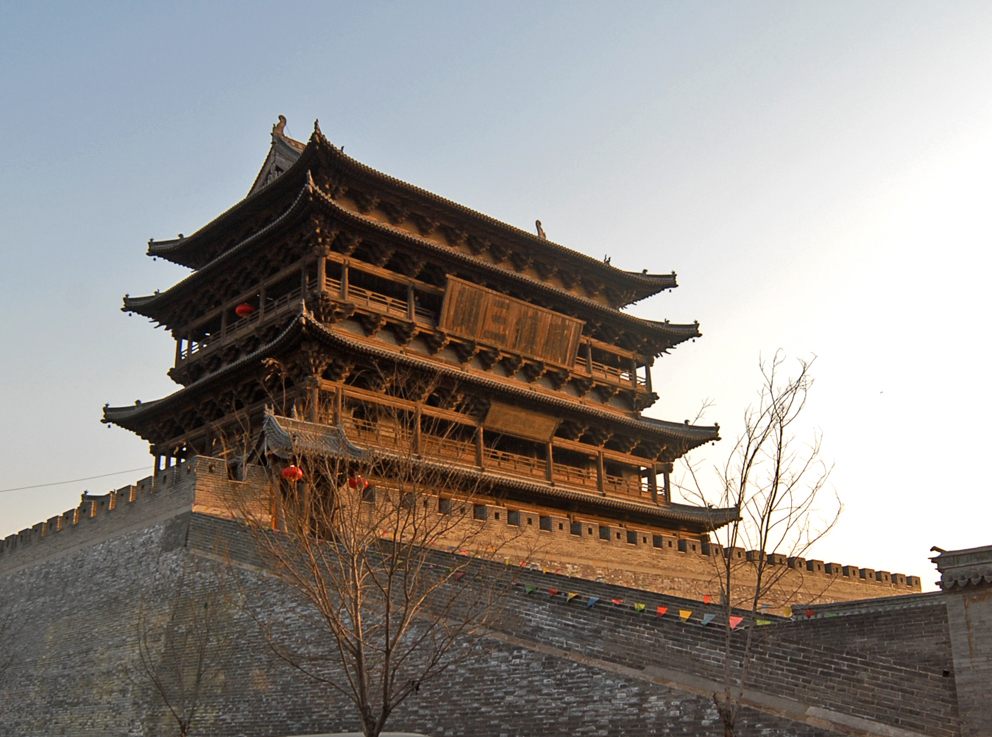
- The Bianjing Drum Tower in Daixian
- Chinese: 代州
- Postal: Taichow
- Literal meaning: Dai Prefecture
Transcriptions
Standard Mandarin
- Hanyu Pinyin: Dàizhōu
- Wade–Giles: Tai Chou; Tai-chou

Dai Prefecture, also known by its Chinese name Daizhou, was a prefecture (zhou) of imperial China in what is now northern Shanxi. It existed intermittently from AD 585 to 1912. Its eponymous seat Daizhou was located at Shangguan in Dai County. The territory it administered included all or part of what are now the counties of Dai, Wutai, Fanshi, and Yuanping in Shanxi's Xinzhou Prefecture.

== Name ==
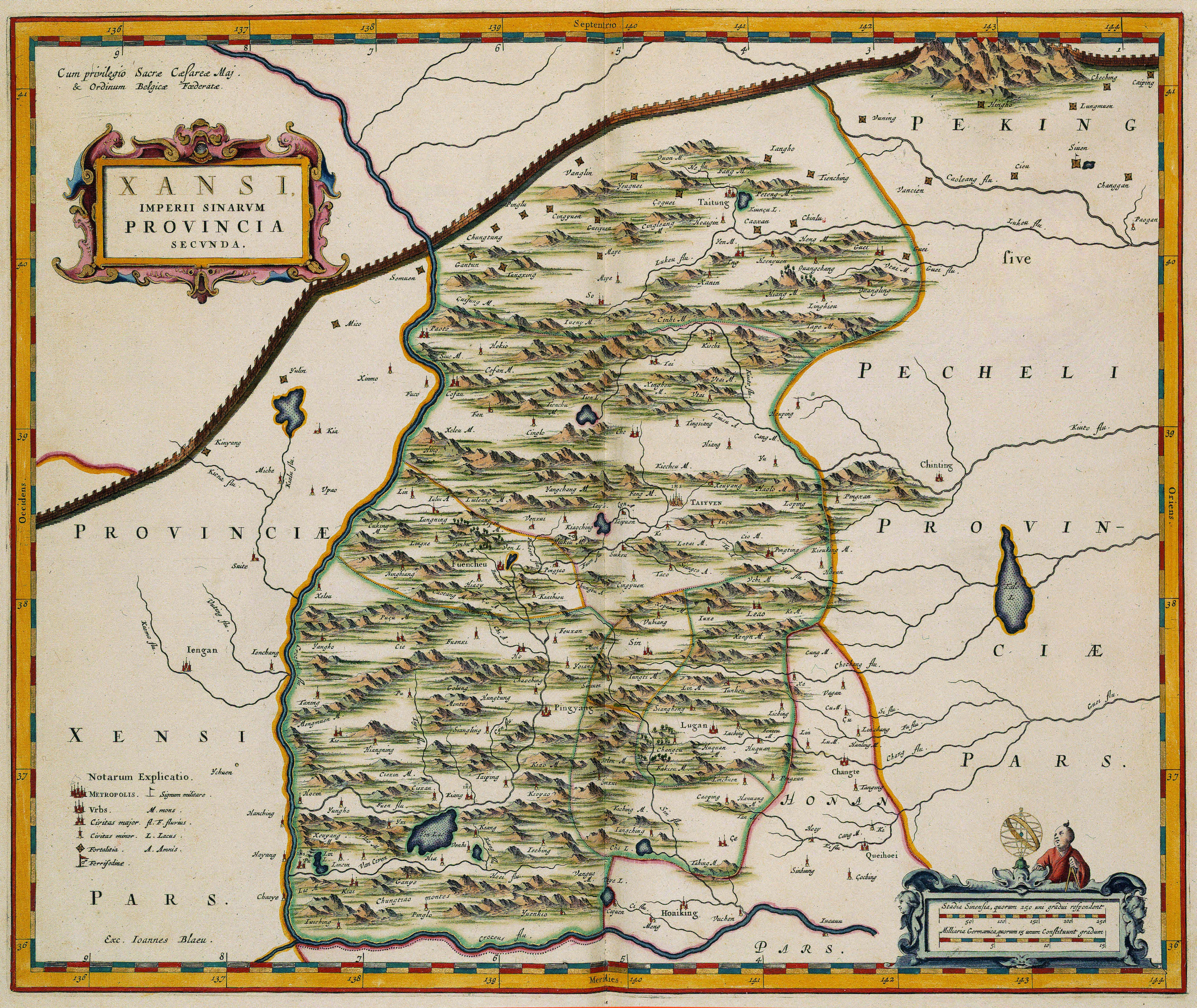
Martino Martini's 1655 map of "Xansi", showing "Tai" on the "Kuito" River and "Vtai" beside "Vtai" Mountain in the central north.

Dàizhōu is the pinyin form of the Standard Mandarin reading of the Chinese placename 代州. In the system of romanization devised by Thomas Wade and systematized by Herbert Giles, the same pronunciation is written Tai Prefecture, Tai Chou, or Tai-chou. It appeared as Taichow or Taichow Sha on the Chinese Postal Map. Although "prefecture" only refers to an administrative office or area in English, the Chinese name can refer to either the prefecture or to the prefectural seat at old or new Guangwu. The prefectural seat was also known for a time as Yanmen. During periods when the prefecture was demoted to county status, its seat was also known as Daixian.

Daizhou was named after Dai Commandery, which was abolished around the time of its formation, even though Guangwu County, in which Daizhou is located, had not been part of it. The commandery in turn had been named after the former capital of the Baidi Kingdom of Dai, whose name represented a transcription of the native name using the Chinese character 代, which is pronounced dài in present-day Mandarin but had probably sounded like /*lˤək-s/ in Old Chinese. That city had been in Hebei's Yu County, but it was used for a series of petty states and appanages during the Warring States, Eighteen Kingdoms, and Han which spread the name into Shanxi's Yanmen and Yunzhong Commanderies. This confusion sometimes caused some medieval writers to erroneously conflate locations in Dai Prefecture (like Mount Wutai) with places from the ancient stories concerning the Zhao conquest of the first Dai Kingdom.

== History ==
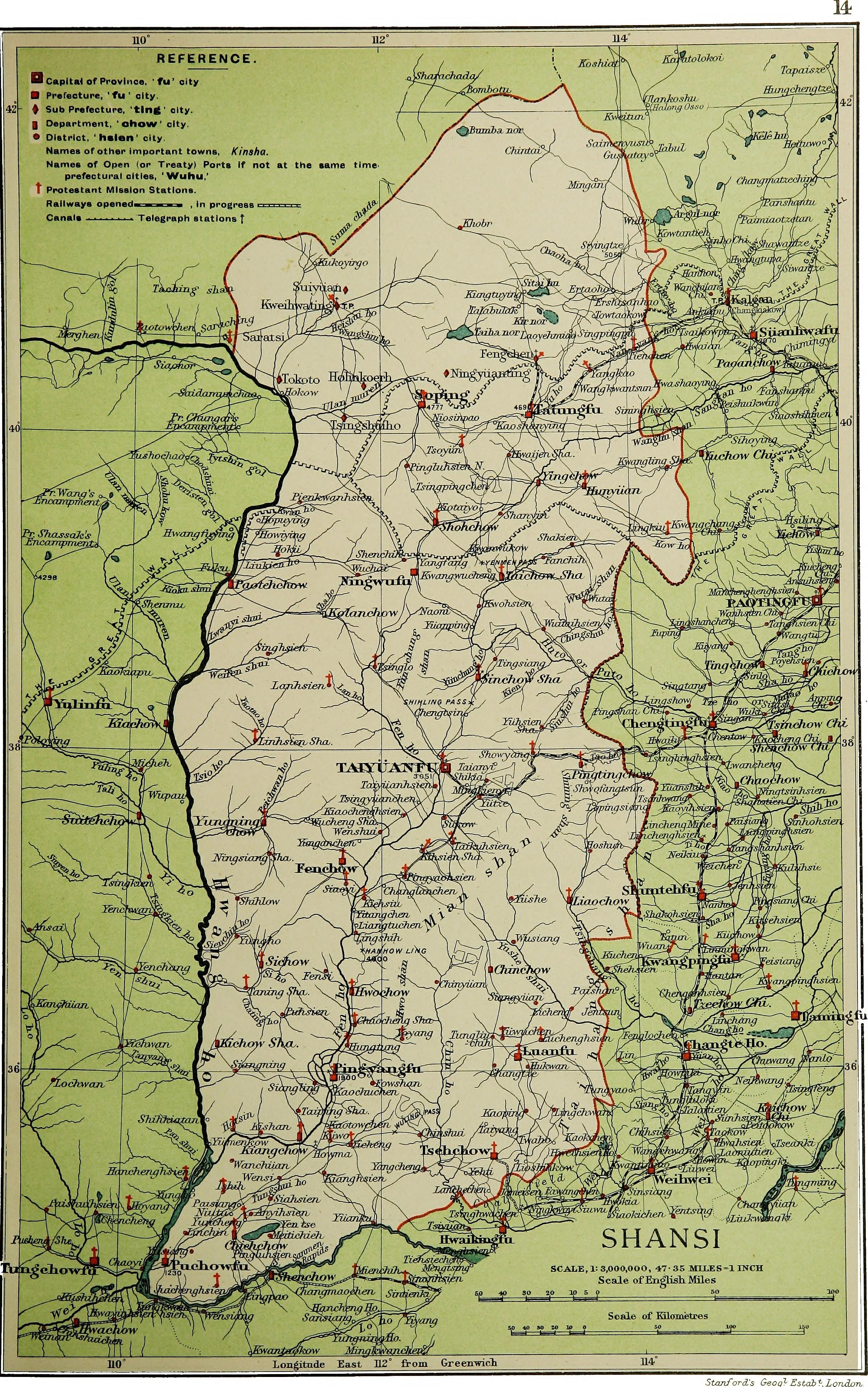
Stanford's 1917 map of "Shansi", with "Taichow Sha" on the "Huto Ho" surrounded by "Yenmen Pass", "Fanchih", "Kwangwucheng", "Kwohsien", "Yüanping", and "Wutai".

Dai Prefecture was created by renaming and reorganizing the earlier Si Prefecture in Yanmen Commandery. This occurred in AD 585 under the Wen Emperor of Sui. Its seat was at present-day Daixian, which was known as Guangwu until 598 and then as Yanmen when its surrounding county was renamed due to the Chinese naming taboo. It was abolished and merged with Yanmen Commandery c. 607.

Dai Prefecture was reëstablished by the Tang in 618, abolished and merged with Yanmen Commandery again in 742, and reëstablished a second time a few years later in 758. Under the Tang, it formed part of Hedong Circuit. During this period, the seat at Daizhou administered a prefecture covering what are now the counties of Dai, Wutai, Fanshi, and Yuanping.

Under the Hongwu Emperor of the Ming, it was demoted to a county for six years beginning in 1369.

Under the Qing, Dai was removed from the authority of Taiyuan Prefecture and made a directly-administered prefecture in 1724 or 1728. Following the Xinhai Revolution, it was converted into various counties in the Republic of China.

== See also ==
- Dai (disambiguation) Various kingdoms and principalities of Dai in Chinese history
- Dai Commandery in early imperial China
- Dai County in present-day Shanxi
