= Dai =

Dai may refer to:

== Names ==
- Dai (given name), a Welsh or Japanese masculine given name
- Dai (surname) (戴), a Chinese surname
- Bảo Đại (保大), Emperor of Vietnam from 1926 to 1945

== Places and regimes ==
- Dai Commandery, a commandery of the state of Zhao and in early imperial China
- Dai County, in Xinzhou, Shanxi, China
- Dai (Eighteen Kingdoms), a short-lived state during the Eighteen Kingdoms period in Chinese history
- Dai (Han dynasty), a realm and title during the Han dynasty
- Dai (Sixteen Kingdoms), a Xianbei-led dynastic state during the Sixteen Kingdoms era of Chinese history
- Dai (Spring and Autumn period), a state during the Spring and Autumn period in Chinese history
- Dai (Warring States period), a short-lived state during the Warring States period in Chinese history

== People and language ==
- Da'i al-Mutlaq, or Da'i, a type of religious leader in Islam
- Da'i, person engaging in Dawah, the act of inviting people to Islam
- Dai language (disambiguation)
- Dai people, an ethnic minority of China
- Dai (Yindu), or Daai Chin, an ethnic tribe of Chin, Myanmar

== Other uses ==
- Dai (spider), a genus of Chinese spiders
- Dai (cryptocurrency), a cryptocurrency-backed stablecoin
- DAI Personal Computer, an early home computer from Belgium
- Mercedes-Benz Group's former Frankfurt Stock Exchange stock symbol
- De Administrando Imperio, work written by the 10th-century Byzantine Emperor Constantine VII
- Deutsches Archäologisches Institut, or German Archaeological Institute, an archaeological institute operated by the German ministry of foreign affairs
- DAI Global, an international development firm
- Diamond Aircraft Industries, an aircraft manufacturer
- Diffuse axonal injury, a type of traumatic brain injury
- Digital Author Identifier, a unique number for an author in the Dutch research system
- Direct audio input, a port used in hearing aids and hearing instruments
- Distributed artificial intelligence, a subfield of artificial intelligence
- Do As Infinity, a Japanese band
- Dragon Age: Inquisition, a video game by BioWare
- Dynamic ARP Inspection, a security protocol
