= Dai County =

Dai County 代县
- County
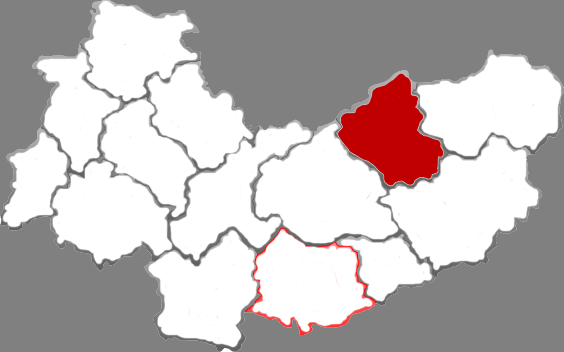
- Location in Xinzhou

- Location of Daixian (i.e., Shangguan) in Shanxi Province
- Coordinates: 39°3′49″N 112°56′35″E
- Country: People's Republic of China
- Province: Shanxi
- Prefecture-level city: Xinzhou

Area
  - Total: 1,729 km^{2} (668 sq mi)

Population (2020)
  - Total: 178,870
  - Density: 103.5/km^{2} (267.9/sq mi)
- Time zone: UTC+8 (China Standard)
- Website: dx.sxxz.gov.cn

Daixian
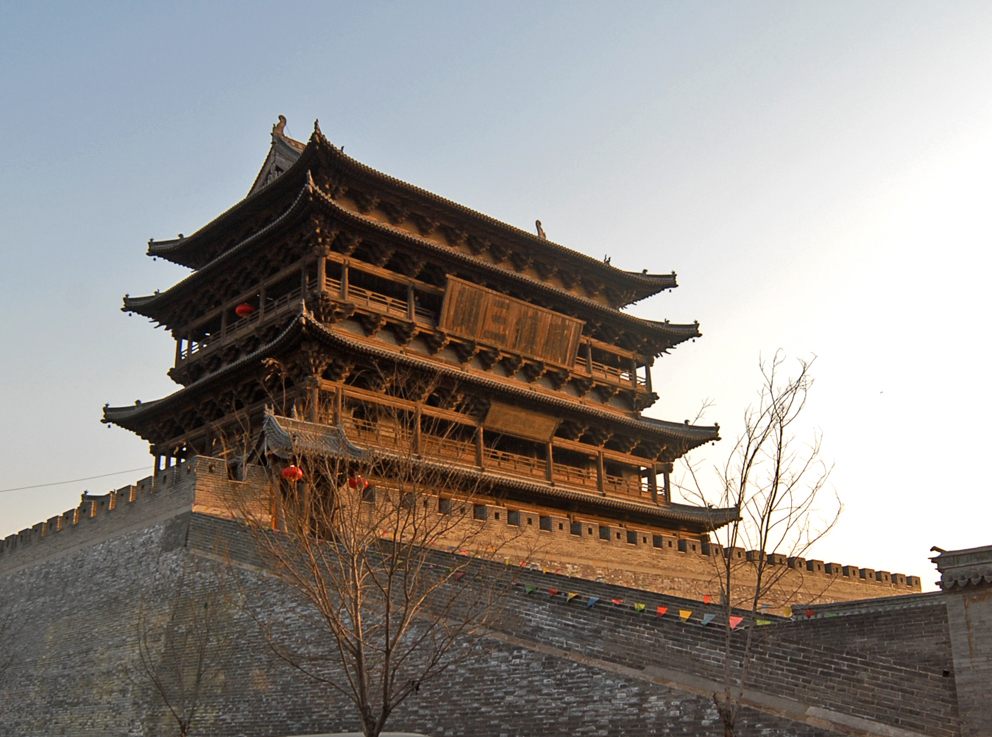
- The Bianjing Drum Tower in Daixian
- Traditional Chinese: 代縣
- Simplified Chinese: 代县
- Literal meaning: Dai County
Transcriptions
Standard Mandarin
- Hanyu Pinyin: Dàixiàn
- Wade–Giles: Tai Hsien; Tai-hsien

Former names
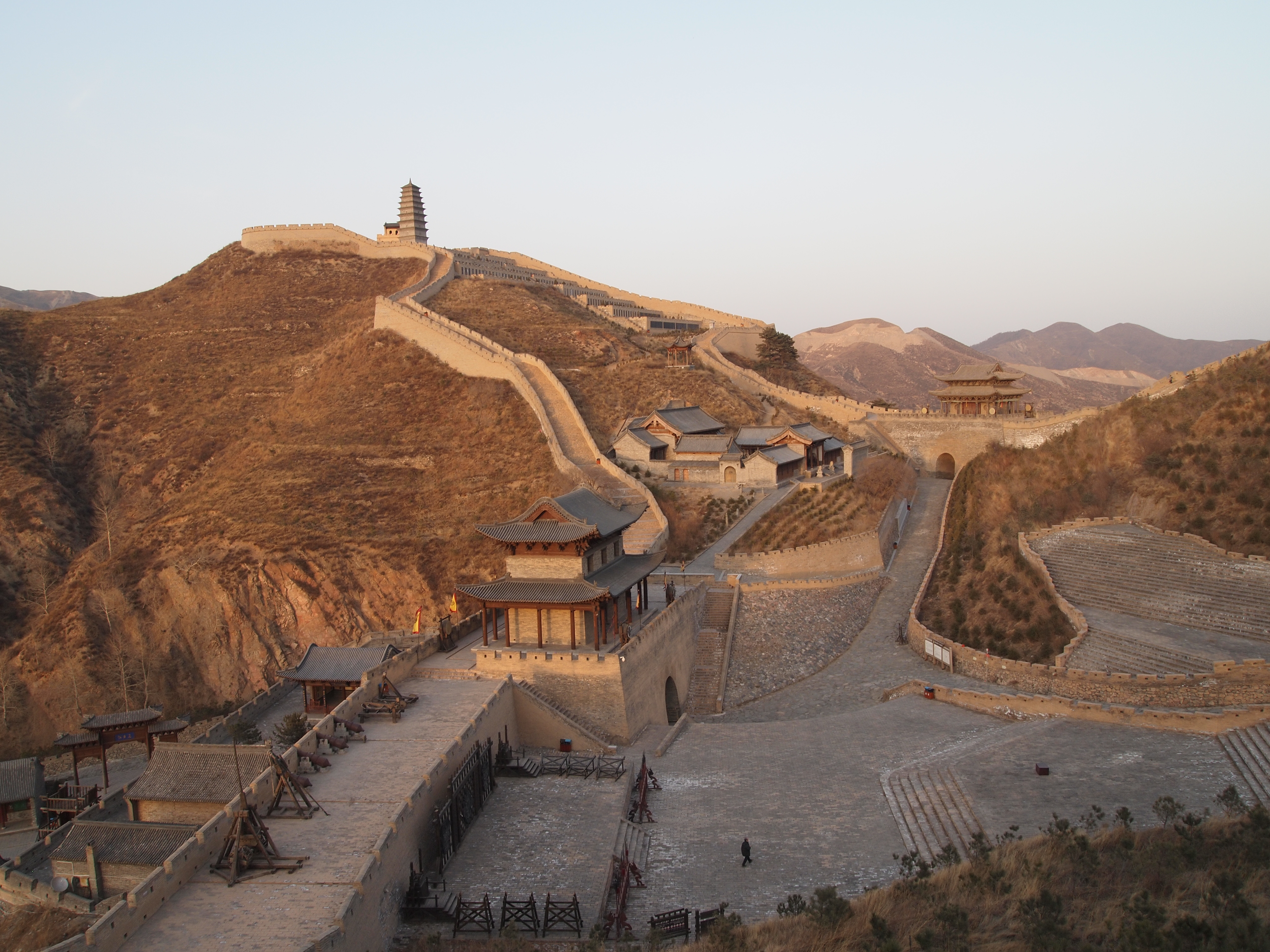
- The Great Wall at Yanmen Pass

Guangwu
- Traditional Chinese: 廣武邑
- Simplified Chinese: 广武邑
- Literal meaning: Expansive-&-Martial Town; Greatly Warlike Town
Transcriptions
Standard Mandarin
- Hanyu Pinyin: Guǎngwǔyì
- Wade–Giles: Kuang-wu I

Guangwu
- Traditional Chinese: 廣武縣
- Simplified Chinese: 广武县
- Literal meaning: Expansive-&-Martial County; Greatly Warlike County
Transcriptions
Standard Mandarin
- Hanyu Pinyin: Guǎngwǔxiàn
- Wade–Giles: Kuang-wu Hsien; Kuang-wu-hsien

Yanmen
- Traditional Chinese: 雁門郡 鴈門郡
- Simplified Chinese: 雁门郡
- Literal meaning: Wild Goose Gate Commandery
Transcriptions
Standard Mandarin
- Hanyu Pinyin: Yànménjùn
- Wade–Giles: Yen-mên Chün

Sizhou
- Chinese: 肆州
Transcriptions
Standard Mandarin
- Hanyu Pinyin: Sìzhōu
- Wade–Giles: Ssu Chou; Ssu-chou

Daizhou
- Chinese: 代州
- Postal: Taichow
- Literal meaning: Dai Prefecture
Transcriptions
Standard Mandarin
- Hanyu Pinyin: Dàizhōu
- Wade–Giles: Tai Chou; Tai-chou

Dai County, also known by its Chinese name Daixian, is a county in Xinzhou, Shanxi Province, China. Its county seat at Shangguan is also known as Daixian. The county has an area of 1,729 km^{2} (668 sq mi) and had a population of 178,870 at the time of the 2020 census. The county is the home of the AAAAA-rated Yanmen Pass Scenic Area along the Great Wall, as well as the Bianjing Drum Tower, the Ayuwang Pagoda, and the Zhao Gao Forest Park.

== Names ==
As is usual in Chinese, the name "Daixian" is used for both the county as a whole and for the county seat at Shangguan. Because the English word "county" only typically describes the area, it's more common to use a transcription of the Chinese form of the name when talking about its seat of government. Dàixiàn is the pinyin romanization of the Mandarin pronunciation of the Chinese placename written as 代縣 in traditional characters and as 代县 in the simplified characters now used in mainland China. The same name was formerly written as Tai County, Tai Hsien, or Tai-hsien in the Wade-Giles system. The name was most recently bestowed in 1912, during the organization of the Republic of China.

The county took its name from its predecessor Daizhou or Dai Prefecture, which had existed since AD 585. This name was formerly written as Tai Chou or Tai-chou in Wade–Giles and as Taichow or Taichow Sha by the now abandoned Chinese postal romanization system. Daizhou had taken its name from the recently abolished Dai Commandery, despite having never been part of it or the seat of the earlier "Dai" regions. Dai Commandery had been created by the Zhou state of Zhao to organize its northeastern conquests and was based in the former capital of the Beidi Kingdom of Dai. That city's native name was transcribed using the character 代, now read dài in Mandarin but with an Old Chinese pronunciation that has been reconstructed as /*lˤək-s/. It became known as Daixian as well but was near present-day Yuzhou in Hebei. (Note: During the medieval period, some historical writers erroneously conflated the two places, e.g., in the stories concerning Zhao's conquest of the Dai Kingdom, which they moved beside Mount Wutai in Dai Prefecture (now Shanxi's Wutai County).) Its name was used for the rump kingdom of Zhao established by Prince Jia to oppose Qin in the 220s BC; after the fall of Qin, there was a Dai among Xiang Yu's Eighteen Kingdoms and the Han Empire's princely appanages. These included the commanderies of Yunzhong and Yanmen in northern Shanxi along with the old Dai homeland in northwestern Hebei, spreading the name westward into Shanxi.

The earlier name for the county had been Guangwu ("Broad-&-Martial"), with its eponymous county seat located southwest of present-day Shangguan. It was also known as Yanmen (after the nearby pass) once the seat of Yanmen Commandery was moved to Guangwu from Yinguan (near present-day Shuozhou, Shanxi) under the Kingdom of Wei during China's Three Kingdoms period. These names followed the posts when they moved to Shangguan under the Northern Wei. It ceased to be called Guangwu in 589 at the creation of Yanmen County; it ceased to be called Yanmen after that county was abolished under the Yuan. The town was also briefly known as Sizhou under the Northern Zhou and early Sui after Si Prefecture was relocated to Shangguan in 579 from its original seat northwest of Xinzhou. Present day villages of New Guangwu and Old Guangwu along with the Guangwu section of the Great Wall are located in adjacent Shanyin County.

== Geography ==
Dai County's present territory covers 1,729 square kilometers (668 sq mi). It lies in northeastern Shanxi Province between Taiyuan to the south and Datong to the north, with the Yanmen Pass forming a natural choke point which once controlled access to central Shanxi from the Eurasian Steppe. (The pass is still used by the G208, although the larger Erguang Expressway now passes to its west.)

The main river is the Hutuo. Its principal tributaries within the county are the E (峨河, É Hé), the Zhongjie (中解河, Zhōngjiě Hé), the Yukou (峪口河, Yùkǒu Hé), the Guangou (t 關溝河, s 关沟河, Guāngōu Hé), and the Qili (七里河, Qīlǐ Hé).

The highest points are the Heige Tajian (黑圪塔尖, Hēigē Tǎjiān; 2,548 m or 8,360 ft) and Mantou Mountain (t 饅頭山, s 馒头山, Mántoushān; 2,426 m or 7,959 ft). Parts of the chains belonging to Mount Heng to the north and Mount Wutai to the east also reach Dai County.

== Climate ==
Climate data for Daixian, elevation 860 m (2,820 ft), (1991–2020 normals, extremes 1981–2010)
| Month | Jan | Feb | Mar | Apr | May | Jun | Jul | Aug | Sep | Oct | Nov | Dec | Year |
|---|---|---|---|---|---|---|---|---|---|---|---|---|---|
| Record high °C (°F) | 11.0 (51.8) | 17.9 (64.2) | 28.3 (82.9) | 36.4 (97.5) | 36.1 (97.0) | 40.2 (104.4) | 37.9 (100.2) | 35.1 (95.2) | 33.2 (91.8) | 28.0 (82.4) | 20.9 (69.6) | 15.0 (59.0) | 40.2 (104.4) |
| Mean daily maximum °C (°F) | 0.5 (32.9) | 4.8 (40.6) | 11.6 (52.9) | 19.6 (67.3) | 25.6 (78.1) | 28.9 (84.0) | 29.1 (84.4) | 27.6 (81.7) | 23.4 (74.1) | 17.1 (62.8) | 8.4 (47.1) | 1.6 (34.9) | 16.5 (61.7) |
| Daily mean °C (°F) | −7.2 (19.0) | −3.1 (26.4) | 3.8 (38.8) | 11.7 (53.1) | 18.1 (64.6) | 21.9 (71.4) | 23.1 (73.6) | 21.3 (70.3) | 15.9 (60.6) | 9.2 (48.6) | 0.9 (33.6) | −5.7 (21.7) | 9.2 (48.5) |
| Mean daily minimum °C (°F) | −13.3 (8.1) | −9.2 (15.4) | −2.9 (26.8) | 4.0 (39.2) | 10.2 (50.4) | 15.0 (59.0) | 17.7 (63.9) | 16.0 (60.8) | 9.8 (49.6) | 2.9 (37.2) | −4.6 (23.7) | −11.2 (11.8) | 2.9 (37.2) |
| Record low °C (°F) | −26.7 (−16.1) | −22.5 (−8.5) | −18.0 (−0.4) | −7.6 (18.3) | −2.5 (27.5) | 5.0 (41.0) | 8.7 (47.7) | 6.5 (43.7) | −1.1 (30.0) | −9.9 (14.2) | −25.6 (−14.1) | −26.4 (−15.5) | −26.7 (−16.1) |
| Average precipitation mm (inches) | 1.7 (0.07) | 3.6 (0.14) | 8.9 (0.35) | 18.2 (0.72) | 34.3 (1.35) | 55.8 (2.20) | 117.7 (4.63) | 104.8 (4.13) | 51.1 (2.01) | 24.0 (0.94) | 10.6 (0.42) | 1.8 (0.07) | 432.5 (17.03) |
| Average precipitation days (≥ 0.1 mm) | 1.4 | 2.4 | 3.6 | 5.2 | 7.2 | 10.2 | 12.3 | 11.7 | 9.1 | 6.2 | 3.4 | 1.3 | 74 |
| Average snowy days | 2.4 | 3.9 | 3.2 | 1.0 | 0.1 | 0 | 0 | 0 | 0 | 0.2 | 2.7 | 2.7 | 16.2 |
| Average relative humidity (%) | 46 | 43 | 41 | 41 | 43 | 55 | 71 | 75 | 71 | 62 | 56 | 50 | 55 |
| Mean monthly sunshine hours | 191.8 | 191.3 | 229.1 | 247.6 | 270.0 | 241.6 | 229.8 | 221.2 | 207.1 | 209.5 | 185.6 | 181.8 | 2,606.4 |
| Percentage possible sunshine | 63 | 63 | 61 | 62 | 61 | 54 | 51 | 53 | 56 | 61 | 62 | 62 | 59 |
Source: China Meteorological Administration

== History ==
=== Ancient China ===
Present-day Dai County lies to north of the historic heartland of ancient Chinese civilization in the Fen, Wei, and Yellow River valleys. The Chinese knew their northern neighbors as the Di or "Northern Barbarians". The "White Di" (Baidi) are recorded originating in north Shaanxi west of the Yellow River but had settled in the Hutuo Valley by the 6th century BC.

The Zhou state of Jin pushed sporadically northward through both invasions and bribery of the Di's ruling class until its disintegration at the end of the Spring and Autumn period. King Yong (posthumously known as the "Wuling" or "Martial-&-Numinous King") of the Jin successor state of Zhao adopted nomad-style clothing, equipment, and cavalry tactics in 307 BC; in campaigns in 306 and 304 BC overran the Loufan (t 樓煩, s 楼烦, Lóufán) and "forest nomads" (林胡, Línhú) of the Hutuo Valley and the lands to the northwest of the Yanmen Pass, opening up to the Eurasian steppe. He organized these conquests together with Zhao-held Dai as the three commanderies of Yunzhong, Yanmen, and Dai. He protected them by erecting long earthen barricades along what is now considered the Outer Great Wall, as well as a fortress overlooking Yanmen Pass in present-day Dai County. The town of Guangwu, southwest of present-day Shangguan, was established under the Zhao as well.

After Qin's conquest of Zhao in 228 BC, its Prince Jia tried to reëstablish his family's kingdom in its northern commanderies; this "Kingdom of Dai" was quickly overrun by the Qin general Wang Ben in 222 BC, just prior to the reunification of China.

=== Imperial China ===
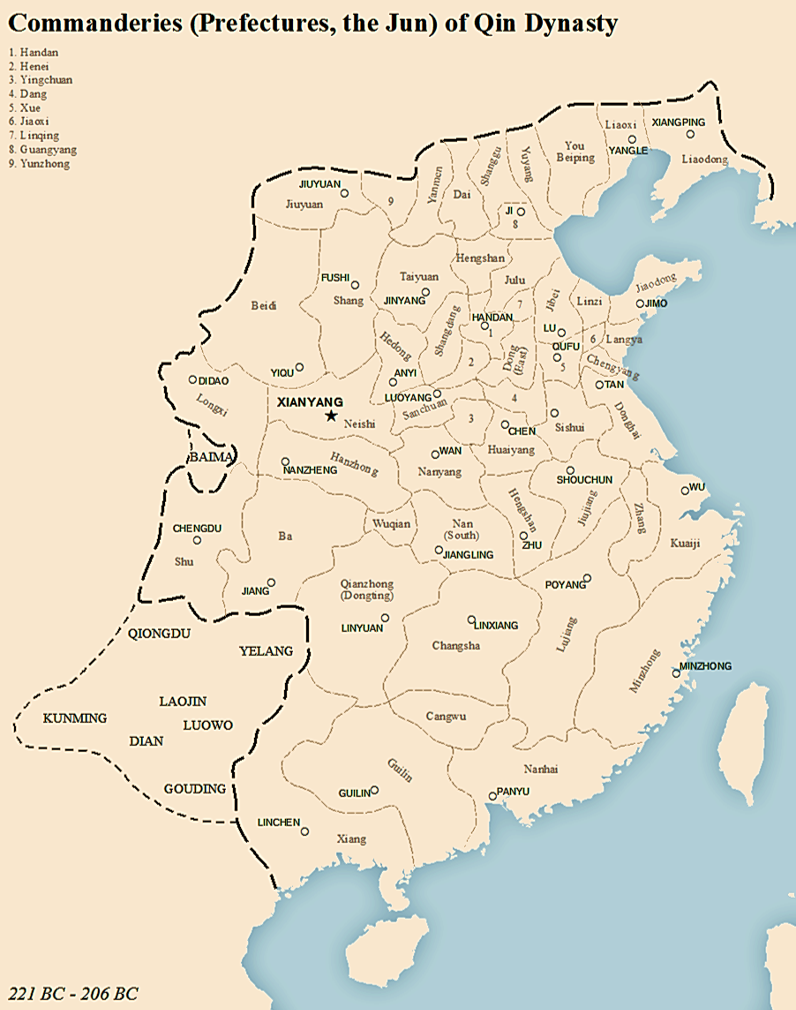
Commanderies of the Qin Empire, with Dai in the north. The territory of present-day Dai County, however, was not located within it but the adjacent commanderies of Yanmen and Taiyuan.

Under the First Emperor's rule, an administrative overhaul abolished China's former states and provinces, making the relatively small commanderies the highest level of regional government. Zhao's former holdings in northern Shanxi west of Mount Heng formed Qin's Yanmen Commandery, with its seat at Shanwu in present-day Youyu County. The frontier walls of the former states, including Zhao's, were merged into the first form of the Great Wall of China. Guangwu was promoted to the seat of its own county, overseeing the parts of present-day Dai County in the Hutuo Valley. This was part of the Taiyuan Commandery under the Qin (Note: Guangwu was not listed with Taiyuan's other counties in Hou, but appears in the Liye Slips discovered in 2002.) and Western Han, when it was part of the province of Bingzhou. Under the Eastern Han and Wei, the area was part of Yanmen Commandery, whose seat was at Mayi (present-day Shuozhou).

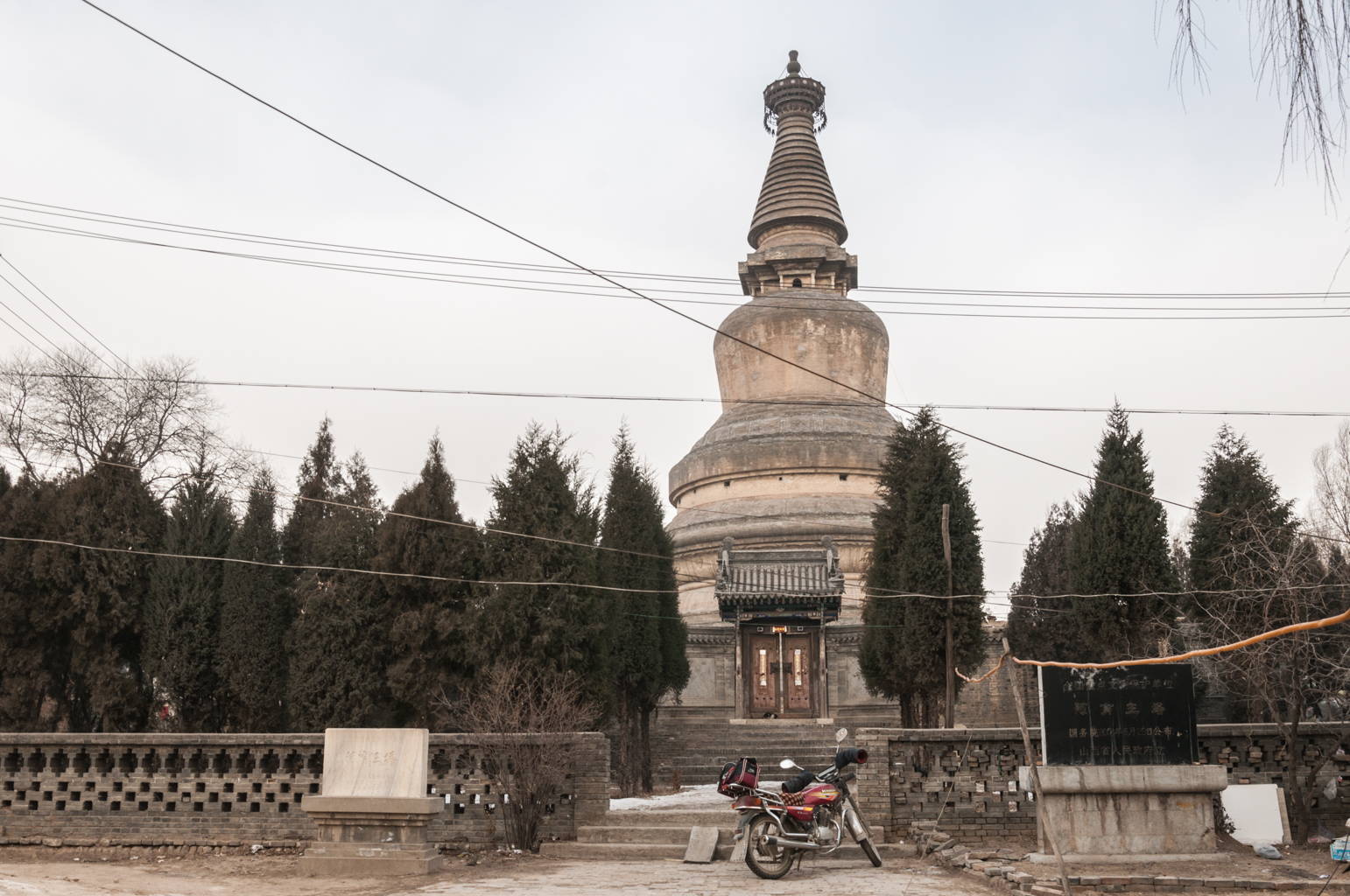
Ayuwang Pagoda

The county seat of Guangwu moved to what is now Shangguan under the Northern Wei. An earthen wall 8 li in circumference was raised to protect the town. It became the seat of Dai Prefecture in 585 during the Sui, eventually taking its name as Daizhou. The prefecture covered parts of the present-day counties of Dai, Fanshi, Wutai, and Yuanping. The Ayuwang Pagoda was also first constructed under the Sui, but suffered repeated fires; the present Tibetan-style dagoba dates to the Yuan. The town was also known as Yanmen during this period, as it was the seat of the Yanmen Commandery. On 11 September 615, the Sui emperor Yang Guang (posthumously known as the Yang or Lazy Emperor) was besieged there by the Eastern Turkish (Tujue) leader Shibi Khan, who was angry about Chinese efforts to weaken and divide his realm. In his distress, Yang Guang promised promotions and rewards to the garrison and those who might rescue him. Credit became muddled, however, when the khan's Chinese wife Princess Yicheng responded to his pleas by sending a false report to her husband about an attack on the Turkish homeland. After the Turks withdrew, the emperor chose to renege on most of his promises; the event built animosity in the Chinese army ahead of the collapse of the Sui.

Dai Prefecture was reëstablished under the Tang, who made it part of their Hedong Circuit. In the spring of 623, the Eastern Turkish Jiali Khan and the Chinese rebels Gao Kaidao and Yuan Junzhang (苑君璋, Yuan Jūnzhāng) jointly besieged the Tang fortress there but were unable to take it. Chinese censuses recorded the district had 36,234 people living in 9,259 households in AD 639 and 100,350 living in 21,280 households in 742.

From 1369 until about 1375, under the early Ming, Dai Prefecture was briefly reorganized as a county. It was during this time that the present fortifications at Yanmen Pass were constructed, and the earthen walls at Shangguan were given a brick façade. Dai Prefecture was administered under the Ming and early Qing as part of the circuits of Yanmen (t 雁門道 or 鴈門道, s 雁门道, Yànmén Dào) or Yanping (雁平道, Yànpíng Dào), but it was directly administered by the provincial government after 1724 until near the end of the dynasty, when it was returned to Yanping Circuit. During the early 20th century, the Ming wall still surrounded the city, with four gates and a 20-foot (6 m) deep moat. Daizhou was the site of a Protestant mission run by the Baptist Missionary Society. The nascent Christian community was, however, devastated in 1900 by the Boxer Rebellion and subsequently by the memory of its powerlessness to defend itself.

=== Modern China ===
Following the Xinhai Revolution, the Republic of China reorganized Dai Prefecture as a county in 1912. This was originally under Yanmen Circuit; in 1921, it was placed directly under Shanxi's provincial government. During the Second Sino-Japanese War (WWII), various locations in Dai County saw action during the 1937 Battle of Xinkou. This ended in a Japanese victory but guerrilla actions continued. Following the Communist victory in the Chinese Civil War, Dai County was placed under Xinzhou Prefecture. In 1958, it was merged with Fanshi County, but this arrangement was ended in 1961. In 2001, the county seat Chengguan (t 城關鎮, s 城关镇, Chéngguānzhèn) changed its name to Shangguan and some of Dai County's smaller townships were merged to form larger units. Shangtian and Baicaokou merged to form Yanmenguan; Bata joined Tanshang; Xijiao joined Nieying; Jiaokou joined Xingao; Fenshuiling joined Huyu; and Hujiatan joined Shangmofang.

== Administrative divisions ==
Since 2001, Dai County has been divided into six towns and five townships:

Towns
| Name | Simp. | Trad. | Pinyin | Population 2010 |
|---|---|---|---|---|
| Shangguan | 上馆镇 | 上館鎮 | Shǎngguǎnzhèn | 65,960 |
| Yanmingbao | 阳明堡镇 | 陽明堡鎮 | Yángmíngbǎo Zhèn | 19,840 |
| Ekou | 峨口镇 | 峨口鎮 | Ékǒuzhèn | 27,443 |
| Nieying | 聂营镇 | 聶營鎮 | Nièyíngzhèn | 11,628 |
| Zaolin | 枣林镇 | 棗林鎮 | Zǎolínzhèn | 18,537 |
| Tanshang | 滩上镇 | 灘上鎮 | Tānshǎngzhèn | 5,811 |
Townships
| Xingao | 新高乡 | 新高鄉 | Xīngāoxiāng | 21,437 |
| Yukou | 峪口乡 | 峪口鄉 | Yùkǒuxiāng | 17,997 |
| Shangmofang | 上磨坊乡 | 上磨坊鄉 | Shǎngmòfáng Xiāng | 12,347 |
| Huyu | 胡峪乡 | 胡峪鄉 | Húyùxiāng | 5,228 |
| Yanmenguan | 雁门关乡 | 雁門關鄉 鴈門關鄉 | Yànménguān Xiāng | 7,863 |

These 11 township-level divisions are in turn divided into eight residential communities and 377 villages (2015). The county seat is at Shangguan, with the main offices located on its East Main Street (t 東大街, s 东大街, Dōng Dàjiē).

== Demographics ==
During the 2010 census, there were 214,091 residents in the county.

== Tourism ==
Daizhou Confucian Temple

Yanmenguan Township is home to the Yanmen Pass Scenic Area, a mountain pass bearing a major fortress along the Great Wall that has been given a AAAAA rating by the China National Tourism Administration. The area has been strategically important and fortified since the Warring States period, although the present works date to the 14th century during the early Ming.

Other tourist attractions in Dai County include the Ayuwang or Ashoka Pagoda, a dagoba dating to the Yuan; the Daizhou Confucian Temple (t 代州文廟, s 代州文庙, Dàizhōu Wénmiào); the Bianjing Drum Tower (t 邊靖樓, s 边靖楼, Biānjìnglóu); the Yang Ancestral Hall (t 楊家祠堂, s 杨家祠堂, Yángjiā Cítáng); the Zhao Gao National Forest Park (t 趙杲觀國家級森林公園, s 赵杲观国家级森林公园, Zhào Gǎo Guān Guójiā-Jí Sēnlín Gōngyuán); and the Dongduanjing Archeological Site (t 東段景遺址, s 东段景遗址, Dōngduànjǐng Yízhǐ).

== Transportation ==
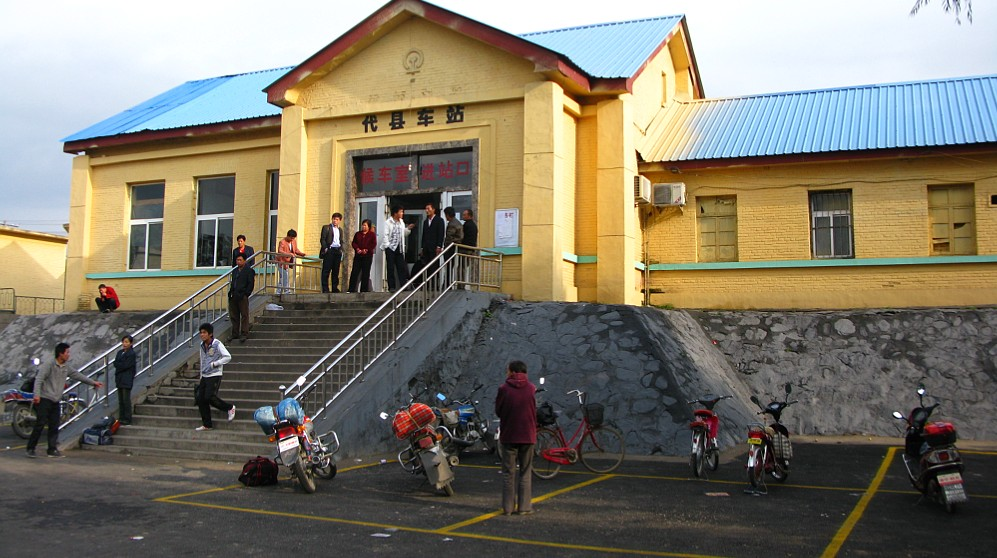
Dai County Railway Station

Buses connecting the county seat Daixian to the East Passenger Station of the provincial capital Taiyuan run about every 30 minutes. Daixian is also connected by daily buses running to Datong's Xinnan Passenger Station.

== See also ==
- Realms of Dai during the Spring & Autumn, Warring States, and Sixteen Kingdoms periods of Chinese history
- Prince of Dai, an appanage during the Han
