= Yanmen (disambiguation) =

Yanmen is a mountain pass which includes three fortified gatehouses along the Great Wall of China.

Yanmen may also refer to:

- Yanmen Commandery, a former imperial Chinese commandery in Shanxi
- Yanmenguan Township, a township surrounding the pass
- Yanmenguan Village, a village beside the pass
- Yanmen Circuit, a former imperial Chinese circuit governed by Li Keyong
- Yanmen, Mayang, a town in Mayang Miao Autonomous County, Hunan, China
- Yanmen, a town in Jiangyou, Sichuan, China

== See also ==
- Yanmen Pass, a 1940 Chinese film
