= Yanmen Pass =

Mountain pass in Shanxi Province, China

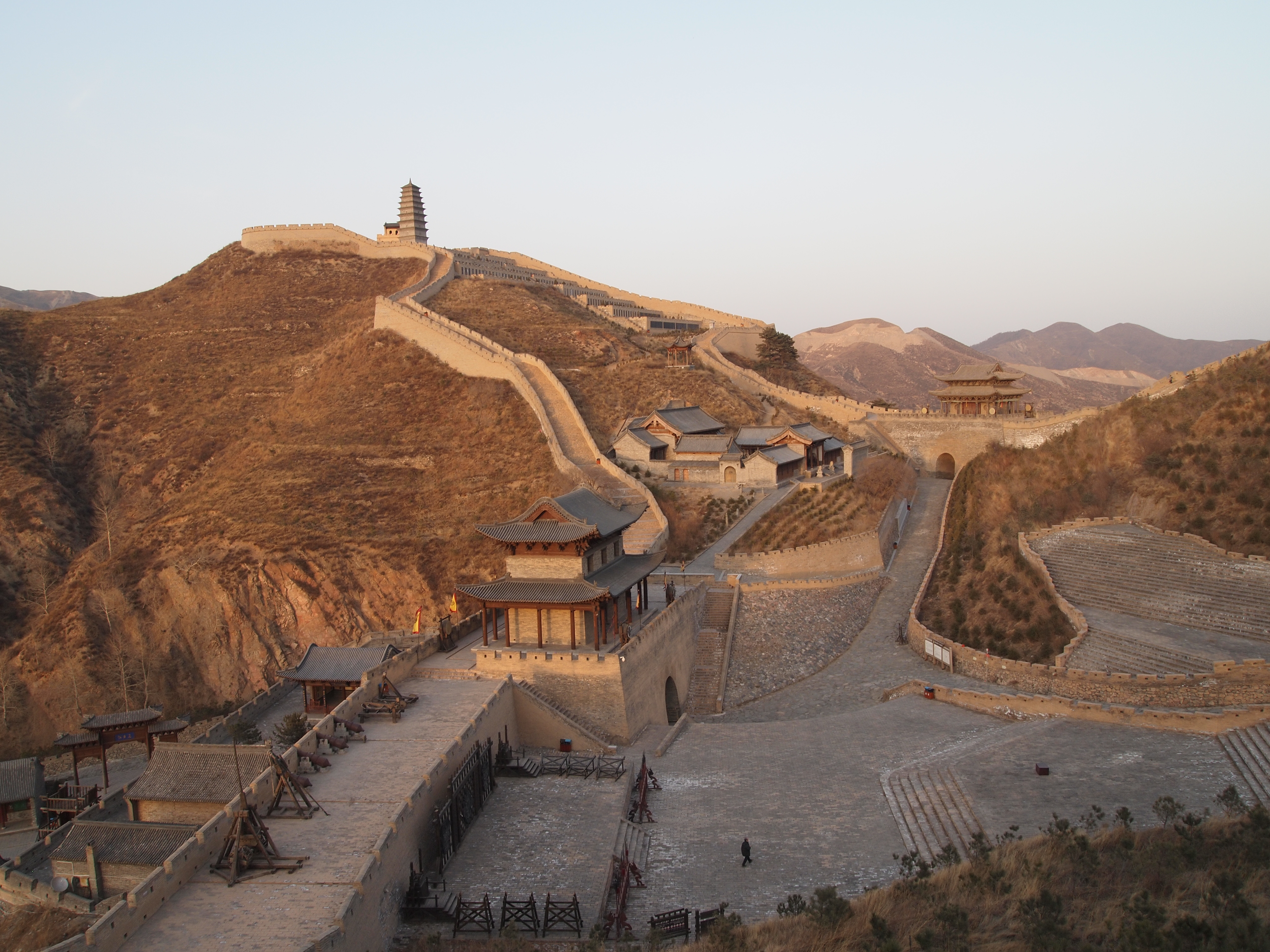
- The Great Wall of China at Yanmen Pass, overlooked by a pagoda

- Location within China

Third Approach
- Location: Shanxi
- Coordinates: 39°11′13″N 112°51′48″E

Yanmen Pass
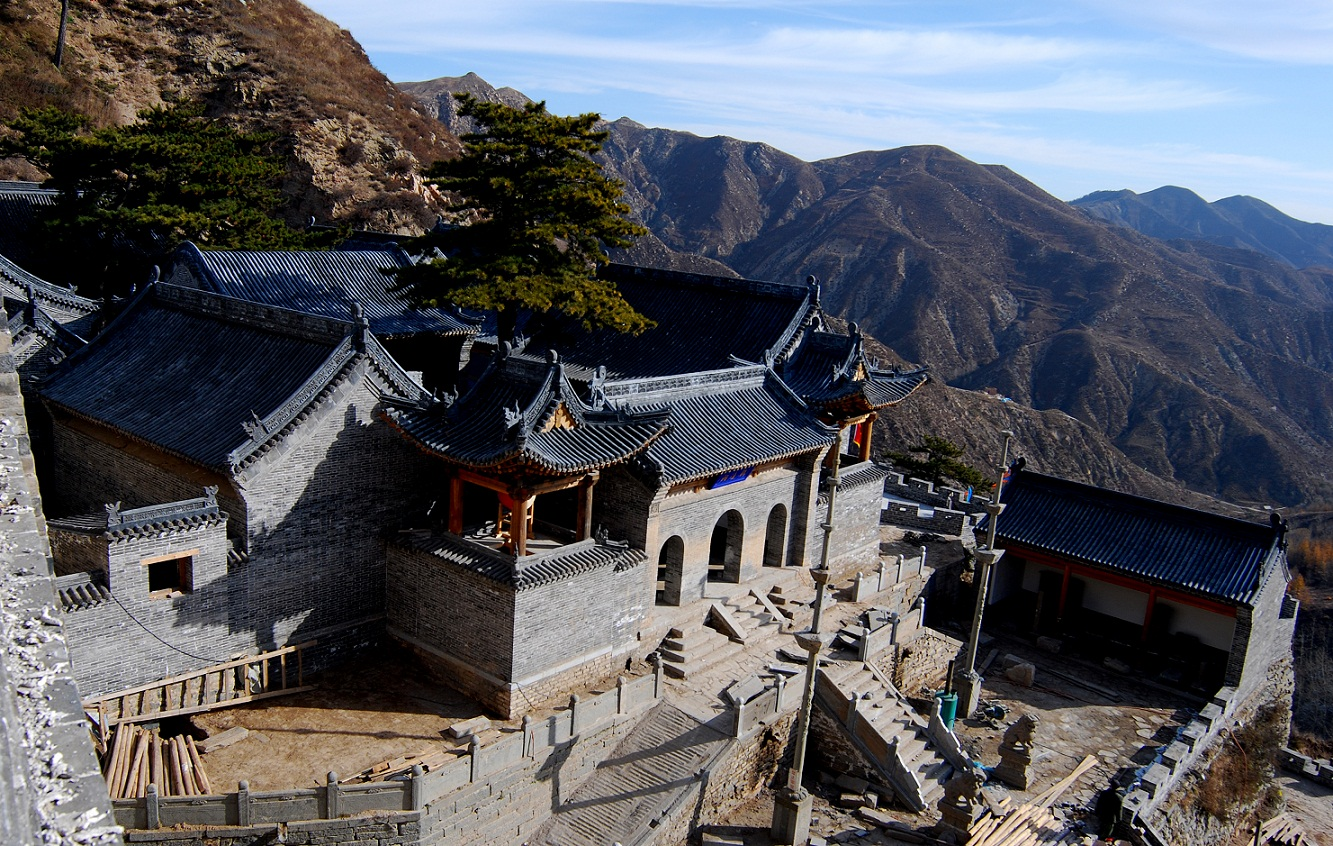
- Traditional Chinese: 雁門關 鴈門關
- Simplified Chinese: 雁门关
- Postal: Yenmen Pass
- Literal meaning: Wild-Goose Gate Pass
Transcriptions
Standard Mandarin
- Hanyu Pinyin: Yànménguān
- Wade–Giles: Yen-men Kuan

Yanmenguan Township
- Traditional Chinese: 雁門關鄉 鴈門關鄉
- Simplified Chinese: 雁门关乡
Transcriptions
Standard Mandarin
- Hanyu Pinyin: Yànménguān Xiāng
- Wade–Giles: Yen-mên-kuan Hsiang

Yanmenguan Village
- Traditional Chinese: 雁門關村 鴈門關村
- Simplified Chinese: 雁门关村
Transcriptions
Standard Mandarin
- Hanyu Pinyin: Yànménguān Cūn
- Wade–Giles: Yen-mên-kuan Tsun

Other names
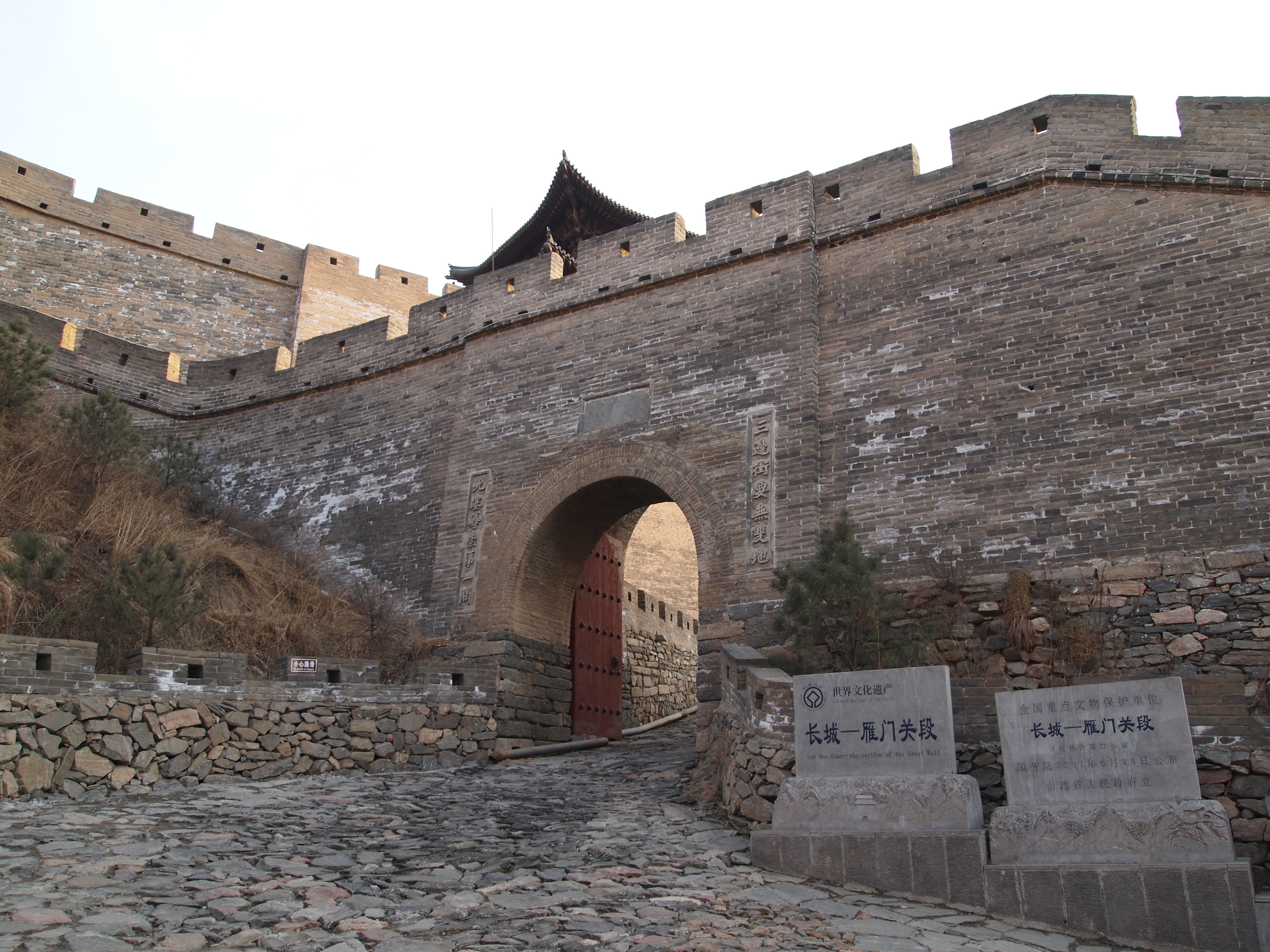

Xixing Pass
- Traditional Chinese: 西陘關
- Simplified Chinese: 西陉关
Transcriptions
Standard Mandarin
- Hanyu Pinyin: Xīxíngguān
- Wade–Giles: Hsi-hsing Kuan

Former names

Shangtian
- Traditional Chinese: 上田鄉
- Simplified Chinese: 上田乡
- Literal meaning: Upper Fields Township; Upon-the-Fields Township
Transcriptions
Standard Mandarin
- Hanyu Pinyin: Shàngtiánxiāng
- Wade–Giles: Shang-t‘ien Hsiang

Baicaokou
- Traditional Chinese: 白草口鄉
- Simplified Chinese: 白草口乡
- Literal meaning: White-Grass Mouth Township
Transcriptions
Standard Mandarin
- Hanyu Pinyin: Báicǎokǒu Xiāng
- Wade–Giles: Pai-ts‘ao-k‘ou Hsiang

Yanmen Pass, also known by its Chinese name Yanmenguan and as Xixingguan, is a mountain pass which includes three fortified gatehouses along the Great Wall of China. The area was a strategic choke point in ancient and medieval China, controlling access between the valleys of central Shanxi and the Eurasian Steppe. This made it the scene of various important battles, extending into World War II, and the area around the gatehouses and this stretch of the Great Wall is now a AAAAA-rated tourist attraction. The scenic area is located just outside Yanmenguan Village in Yanmenguan Township in Dai County, Xinzhou City, Shanxi Province, China.

== Name ==
Yanmen Pass, sometimes translated in English to Wild Goose Pass or Wildgoose Gate, is named after the wild geese who migrate through the area. Yànménguān is the pinyin romanization of the Mandarin pronunciation of the Chinese placename written as 雁門關 or 鴈門關 in traditional characters and as 雁门关 in the simplified characters now used in mainland China. The same name was formerly written as Yen-mên-kuan in the Wade-Giles system and as Yenmen Pass by the Chinese Post Office.

== Geography ==
Yanmen is a pass in the Gouzhu or Yanmen Mountains (a western extension of the Hengshan Range) between the Sanggan River (or Datong) Basin and the Hutuo River (or Xin ding) Basin. The mountains form a natural climatic border, as well, with the Hutuo Valley's milder climate supporting rice cultivation and the Sanggan's colder and drier climate and more saline soil being less conducive to Chinese agriculture. The village of Yanmenguan is about 20 kilometers (10 mi) from the county seat Shangguan (Daixian) and about 180 kilometers (110 mi) northeast of the provincial capital Taiyuan. Once far distant, it now lies near the outskirts of the expanding metropolis of Datong to its northeast.

== History ==
=== Ancient China ===
King Yong of Zhao (posthumously known as the "Wuling" or "Martial-and-Numinous King") invaded and conquered the lands of the Loufan (t 樓煩, s 楼烦, Lóufán) and "forest nomads" (林胡, Línhú) tribes of modern northern Shanxi in 306 and 304 BC. He organized these conquests as the commanderies of Yunzhong, Yanmen, and Dai and, by around 300 BC, had begun erecting earthen defensive works to protect his new holdings from other nomads from the Eurasian steppelands. Although Zhao's Yanmen Commandery was named after the pass, whose premodern importance for accessing the valleys of central Shanxi caused it to be scene of many battles throughout Chinese history, the ramparts raised under King Yong did not run through it but along the northern extent of his territory closer to today Hohhot in Inner Mongolia. Yanmen itself was defended, but by a fort and garrison on a local hill.

=== Imperial China ===
At some point during the reign of the First Emperor of Qin (221–210 BC), a Chu noble named Ban Yi (斑 or 班壹, Bān Yī) fled north to the Loufan near Yanmen. By the early Han Dynasty, his clan had grown rich through herding and trading thousands of heads of cattle and horses, to the point that they may have formed a microstate of their own. The example of their success encouraged greater Chinese settlement of the frontier around Yanmen. The markets were not always safe: In the fall of 129 BC, 40,000 horsemen of the Han Empire massacred the Xiongnu trading at markets along the frontier; (The heavy defeats of Li Guang and Gongsun Ao near Yanmen, however, had them narrowly escape execution through the payment of large fines and their demotion to common status.) The next year or the year after, Wei Qing and 30,000 men rode north from Yanmen and defeated the Xiongnu left in the area, taking control of the entire Ordos Loop. 100,000 Chinese were sent to colonize the area. In 127 BC, the Xiongnu defeated and killed the governor of Liaoxi; Han Anguo (t 韓安國, s 韩安国, Hán Ānguó) tried to hold them near Yanmen with 700 men but was defeated and forced to withdraw to Yuyang. Wei Qing and Li Xi returned to the area in force, capturing some Xiongnu and forcing the rest to withdraw beyond the frontier. The Ban clan ultimately left the tumultuous area and used their accumulated wealth to rise to prominence among the officials of the Eastern Han by the 1st century AD.

A line of the Great Wall was finally built through the pass by the Northern Qi in AD 557. It was part of a massive public works project involving more than 1.8 million laborers ordered by the emperor Gao Yang (posthumously known as the "Wenxuan" or "Civil-&-Responsible Emperor"), intended to protect his realm from the inimical Northern Zhou. As with the later Ming Great Wall, the Northern Qi's Yanmen wall formed an inner line of defense; it was repaired and expanded in 565. Despite its strong defenses, the state itself fell into chaos and was consumed by the Northern Zhou in the late 570s. The retired emperor Yuwen Chan (posthumously known as the "Xuan" or "Responsible Emperor"), acting on behalf of his young successor Yuwen Yun (posthumously the "Jing" or "Silent Emperor"), refortified the wall between Yanmen and Jieshi in 579 to protect Northern China from the Blue Turks and the Khitans. Upon Yuwen Chan's death in 580, his father-in-law Yang Jian seized power, eventually declaring himself the first emperor of the Sui.

The Sui (581–618) rulers regarded the Great Wall as an essential line of defense and ordered large-scale repairs 7 times, but their successors the Tang (618–907) expanded China far to its north, and allowed it to fall into disuse and decay. Following the collapse of the later Tang and its short-lived successor later Han of Five dynasties and Ten Kingdoms era, most of the lands around Shanxi were controlled from Taiyuan by Liu Chong as the Northern Han. Zhao Kuangyin (posthumously known as "Emperor Taizu" or "the Great Ancestor") unified most of China proper as the Song Empire prior to his death in 976, and his younger brother and successor Zhao Jiong (posthumously "Emperor Taizong", also meaning "the Great Ancestor") invaded the Northern Han in 978 and conquered it the next year. In 980, roughly 100,000 nomad horsemen of the Khitan Empire (known to the Chinese as the Liao) invaded Shanxi under their general Li Chonghui (t 李重誨, s 李重诲, Lǐ Chónghuì) and on behalf of their defeated allies. Arriving before Yanmen, Li and his men were encircled and catastrophically defeated by the Song generals Yang Ye and Pan Mei outside the fortress at Baicao Lingkou. The victory killed the Khitan emperor's brother-in-law Xiao Chuoli (t 蕭啜裏, s 萧啜里, Xiāo Chuòlǐ), won Song innumerable horses and war equipment, and secured its new conquests and northern border.

Under the Mongolian Yuan Dynasty, the great khan nominally controlled the peoples on both sides of the wall and its fortifications were fallen into disrepair. Under the Ming, it was reconstructed as part of the Inner Great Wall in 1374 and these are the defensive works seen today. It is one of the few stone stretches of the wall left in Shanxi.

=== Modern China ===
During the Second Sino-Japanese War (the Chinese theater of World War II), He Bingyan led the 716th Regiment of his 358th Brigade of He Long's 120th Division of the Eighth Route Army in an ambush on the Imperial Japanese Army forces at Yanmen Pass on 18 October 1937 as part of the ongoing battles of Xinkou. The regiment claimed to have killed or wounded more than 300 Japanese troops and destroyed more than 20 vehicles at a cost of 112 casualties, then held the area as part of an attempt to cut Japanese lines of supply and communication as they pushed forward to Taiyuan. There was also a skirmish during the night of 20 October, then an assault on a second supply column the next day. This supposedly took out around 200 Japanese and "hundreds" of vehicles. The Japanese were then obliged to begin air assaults and dedicate the Ushiromiya Division to push He's men further north.

Following the war, Yanmen Pass was reckoned as part of the boundary of China's "Third Front", which was used by national authorities in planning infrastructure investment and military defenses. Yanmen Township was created in 2001 from the merger of parts of some of Dai County's smaller settlements, particularly Shangtian and Baicaokou. The Yanmen Pass Scenic Area was named a AAAAA attraction by the China National Tourism Administration in 2017.

== Administrative divisions ==
Yanmenguan Township oversees Yanmenguan and 27 other villages:

Name	Simp.	Trad.	Pinyin
Shangtian	上田村	上田村	Shàngtiáncūn
Dianshang	殿上村	殿上村	Diànshǎngcūn
Chenjiazhuang	陈家庄村	陳家莊村	Chénjiāzhuāng Cūn
Xiduan	西段村	西段村	Xīduàncūn
Beixinzhuang	北新庄村	北新莊村	Běixīnzhuāng Cūn
Yezhuang	野庄村	野莊村	Yězhuāngcūn
Beiwangzhuang	北王庄村	北王莊村	Běiwángzhuāng Cūn
Zhangjiahe	张家河村	張家河村	Zhāngjiāhé Cūn
Xiwa Yaotou	西瓦窑头村	西瓦窯頭村	Xīwǎ Yáotóu Cūn
Qianyaopu	前腰铺村	前腰鋪村	Qiányāopù Cūn
Nankou	南口村	南口村	Nánkǒucūn
Taihe Lingkou	太和岭口村	太和嶺口村	Tàihé Lǐngkǒu Cūn
Shidaoshi	试刀石村	試刀石村	Shìdāoshí Cūn
Baicaokou	白草口村	白草口村	Báicǎokǒu Cūn
Qinzhuang	秦庄村	秦莊村	Qínzhuāngcūn
Wangzhuang	王庄村	王莊村	Wángzhuāngcūn
Xiaogou	小沟村	小溝村	Xiǎogōucūn
Dongshuiquan	东水泉村	東水泉村	Dōngshuǐquán Cūn
Zhaozhuang	赵庄村	趙莊村	Zhàozhuāngcūn
Mabu Daigou	麻布袋沟村	麻布袋溝村	Mábù Dàigōu Cūn
Houyaopu	后腰铺村	後腰鋪村	Hòuyāopù Cūn
Gao'ergou	高二沟村	高二溝村	Gāo'èrgōu Cūn
Yanmenguan	雁门关村	鴈門關村 鴈門關村	Yànménguān Cūn
Dayugou	大峪沟村	大峪溝村	Dàyùgōu Cūn
Liulin	柳林村	柳林村	Liǔlíncūn
Laoxinggou	老杏沟村	老杏溝村	Lǎoxìnggōu Cūn
Hongqiang	红墙村	紅牆村	Hóngqiángcūn
Xintian	新田村	新田村	Xīntiáncūn

== Sites ==
Yanmen was formerly reckoned as the first of the "Nine Passes under Heaven". The preserved Ming fortifications are about 1 kilometer (0.6 mi) long and 4 meters (13 ft) high. It includes three fortified gatehouses. The western gate is called Dili ("Chosen Battleground"), the central gate is Yanmen proper, and the eastern gate is Tianxian ("Impregnable Fortress"). They are open to the public from 8 am to 6:30 pm.

The fortifications in the Yanmen Pass form part of the defenses of the "inner line" of the Great Wall, along with the Ningwu (t 寧武關, s 宁武关, Níngwǔguān) and Pian (t 偏關, s 偏关, Piānguān) or Piantou Passes (t 偏頭關, s 偏头关, Piāntóuguān). Under the Ming and Qing, however, these were reckoned as the Outer Three Passes (t 外三關, s 外三关, Wàisānguān) based on their greater distance from the capital at Beijing, contrasted with the "Inner Three Passes" at Juyong, Zijing, and Daoma.

The Zhenbian Hall is a temple to Li Mu, a Zhao general, beside the Tianxian Gate. It has also been used by local Buddhists since 1856, when the monk Shan Quan began holding services there. There is a temple to Guan Yu, the Chinese god of war, beside the Dili Gate. There was also a frontier market between Yanmenguan Village and the Dili Gate. A flagstone path called "Frontier Trade Street" continues to be lined with hostels and various shops for tourists. Statues of the generals of the Yang Clan line one of the pathways of the site.

The ruins of Guangwu, the former county seat for the area, are nearby. Its remains include Han-era tombs in mounds 2–10 meters (6 ft 7 in – 32 ft 10 in) high. They were excavated by Japanese archaeologists in the early 20th century and have been studied by the Chinese in the 1980s; a tomb robber around that time was caught and exposed that the mounds were not for local elites but for group burial in urns.

== Transportation ==
The Datong–Yuncheng Expressway runs through part of Yanmen Pass. The village of Yanmenguan is connected to the county seat Daixian by bus. The main fortification is about 2 kilometers (1.2 mi) outside of town, reached by walking or shuttle bus. The general inconvenience of transportation to the site means that it is less crowded than other well-known sites along the wall.

== Popular media ==
The Battle of Yanmen Pass is an important moment in the Chinese legends, folktales, and plays collectively known as The Generals of the Yang Family. Likewise, because of its strategic importance to ancient and medieval China, Yanmen Pass and its fortifications feature prominently in some Chinese historical fiction novels, including Louis Cha's Demi-Gods and Semi-Devils, and films, including Daniel Lee's 14 Blades.
