= Drum Tower of Nanjing =

Drum tower in Nanjing, China

Coordinates: 32°03′31″N 118°46′55″E

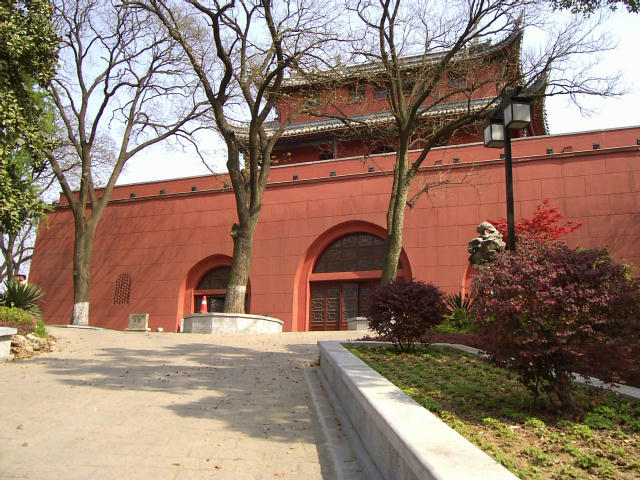
The drum tower

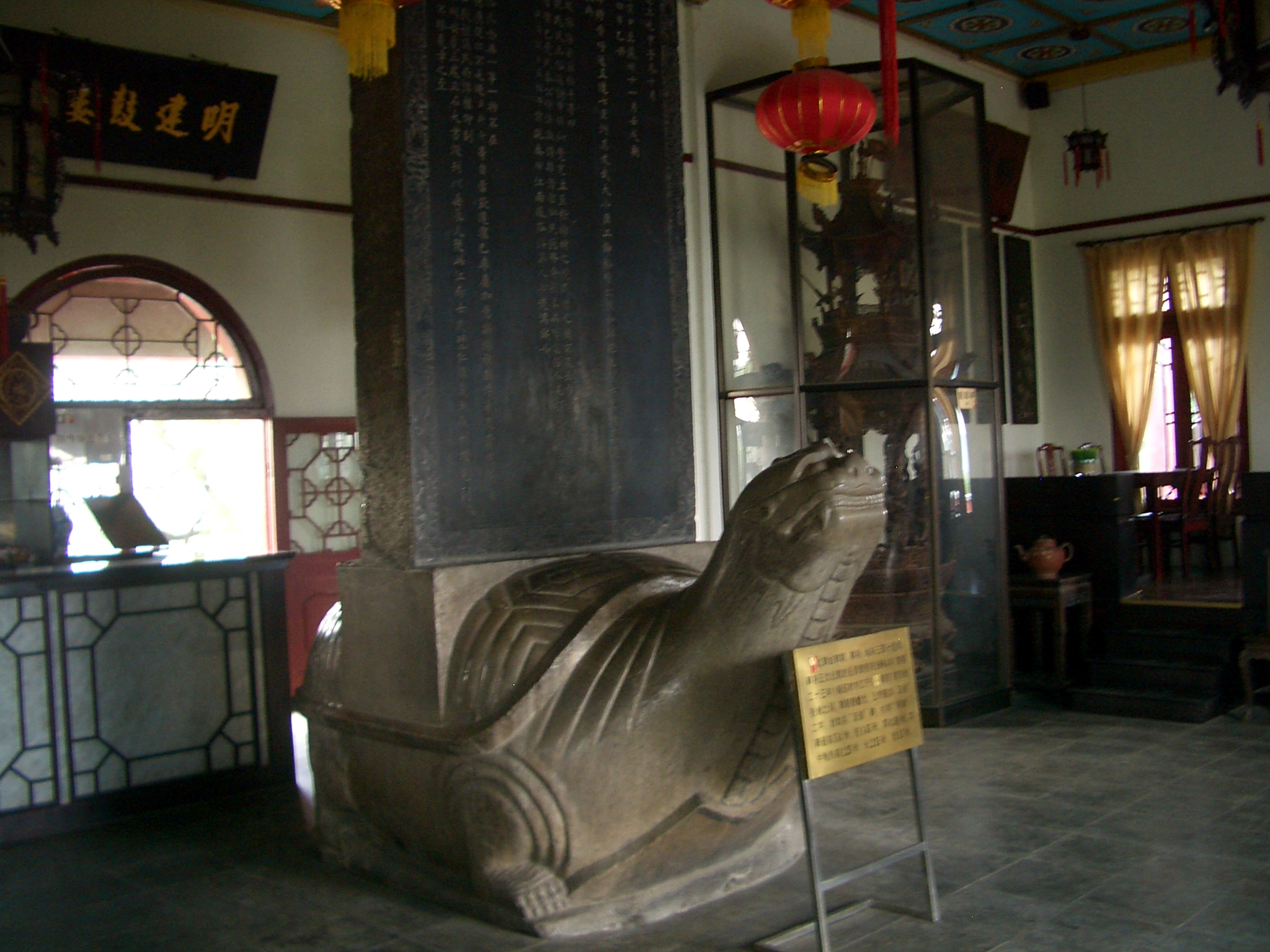
Kangxi stele

The Drum Tower of Nanjing (simplified Chinese: 南京鼓楼; traditional Chinese: 南京鼓樓; pinyin: Nánjīng gǔlóu) on Gulou Mountain in the Gulou District of downtown Nanjing, was first built in the 15th year of the reign of Hongwu, founding emperor of the Ming Dynasty (1382 AD).

The Drum Tower, which is an important part of Drum Tower Park, is 44 meters long, 22 meters wide and 30 meters high. Its shape is like a Chinese traditional city gate, with a square foundation pedestal made of stone. In the pedestal, there are three archways: one larger in the middle and two smaller on the each side. In the side gateways, there are four side-rooms, which were guarded by the imperial drumming officers with hundreds of soldiers during the ancient dynasty. On the pedestal is a red two-story watch tower, made of wood and bricks, which was a sacred place to hold some important imperial ceremonies, such as giving a correct time, welcoming honorable guests, offering sacrifices to the god, and others.

== See also ==
- Drum tower (Asia)
