= Dai language =

Dai language may refer to:

== Tai languages ==
- The Tai languages in general
- Dai Zhuang language, Dàizhuàngyǔ, 岱壮语, spoken primarily in Wenshan Prefecture, Yunnan, China
- Tai Dam language, Dǎinǎyǔ, 傣哪语; Dǎidānyǔ, 傣担语, spoken by the Tai Dam people in Southeast Asia
- Tai Jinping language, 金平傣语, spoken in Southern China
- Tai Hongjin language, 红金傣语, spoken in Southern China
- Tai Lü language, Dǎilèyǔ, 傣仂语, spoken by the Lu people in Southeast Asia
- Tai Nüa language, Déhóng Dǎiyǔ, 德宏傣语, spoken by the Dai people, especially in Yunnan province, China
- Tai Ya language, Dǎiyǎyǔ, 傣雅语, spoken primarily in southern China and Thailand

== Other languages ==
- Dai language (Austronesian), a minor Austronesian language spoken on Dai Island in South Maluku, Indonesia
- Dai language (Chad), an Adamawa language of southern Chad
- Dai language (Solomon Islands), a Malayo-Polynesian group language spoken on northeast Malaita of the Solomon Islands

== See also ==
- Dai (disambiguation)
- Daai language, spoken by the Daai Chin people of Myanmar
