= Ayuwang Pagoda =

Pagoda in Dai County, Shanxi, China

Coordinates: 39.0803°N 112.955°E

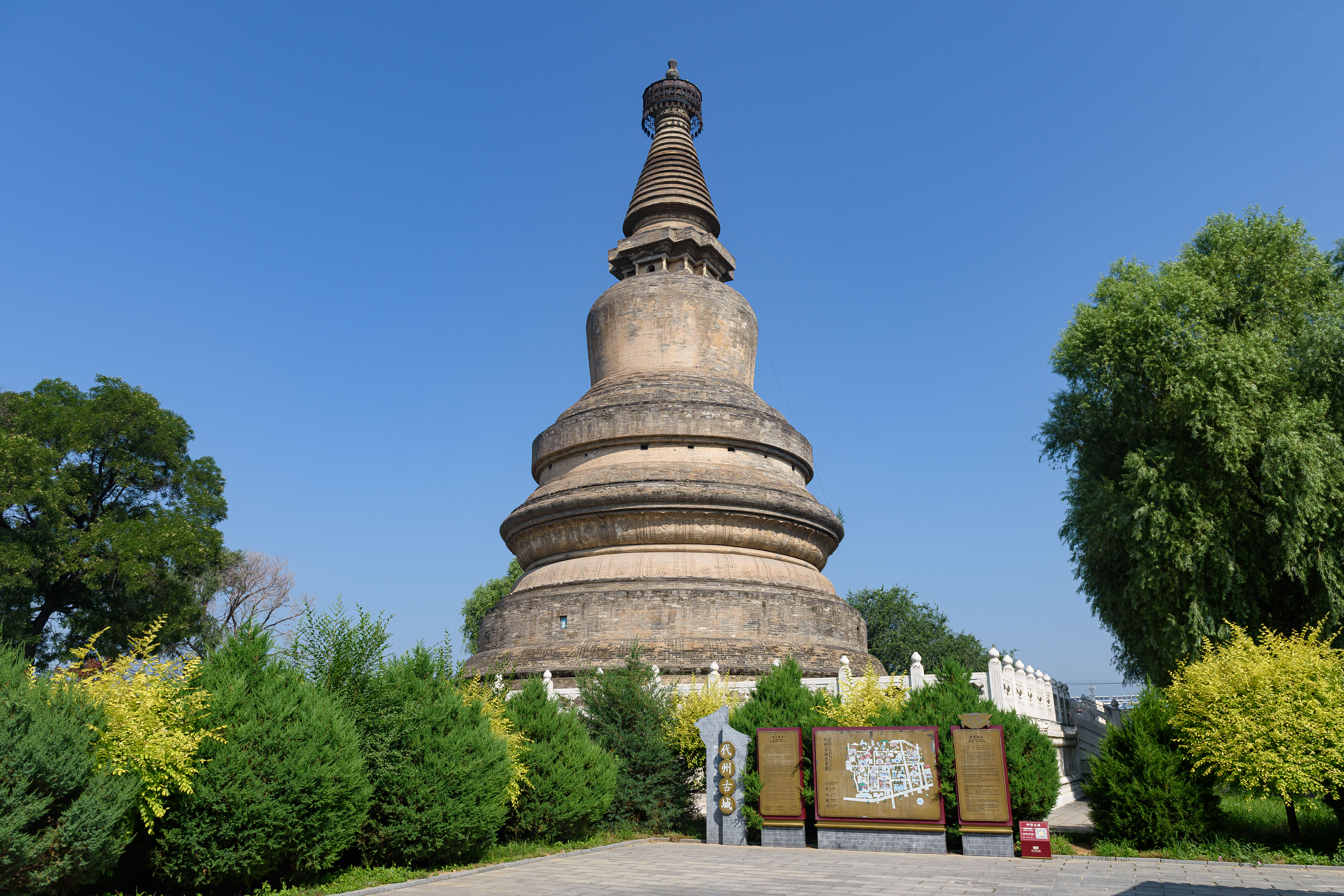
- Chinese: 阿育王塔
- Literal meaning: Ashoka Tower; Ashoka Pagoda
Transcriptions
Standard Mandarin
- Hanyu Pinyin: Āyùwáng tǎ
- Wade–Giles: A-yü Wang T‘a

The Ayuwang or Ashoka Pagoda is a stupa in Dai County in northeast Xinzhou Prefecture in northern Shanxi, China.

== Name ==
The Ayuwang Pagoda's name honors Ashoka, the Mauryan emperor who converted to Buddhism around 263 BC and subsequently greatly patronized the religion.

== History ==
The Ayuwang Pagoda was first built under the Sui dynasty in AD 601. Over the next 600 years, it was destroyed and rebuilt three times. Its present form dates to the Mongol-led Yuan dynasty of China, who favored Tibetan Buddhism and rebuilt the tower in a Tibetan style. This dagoba was heavily damaged by an earthquake during the Qing dynasty and subsequently repaired.
