= Drum tower (Asia) =

Asian building for signal drums

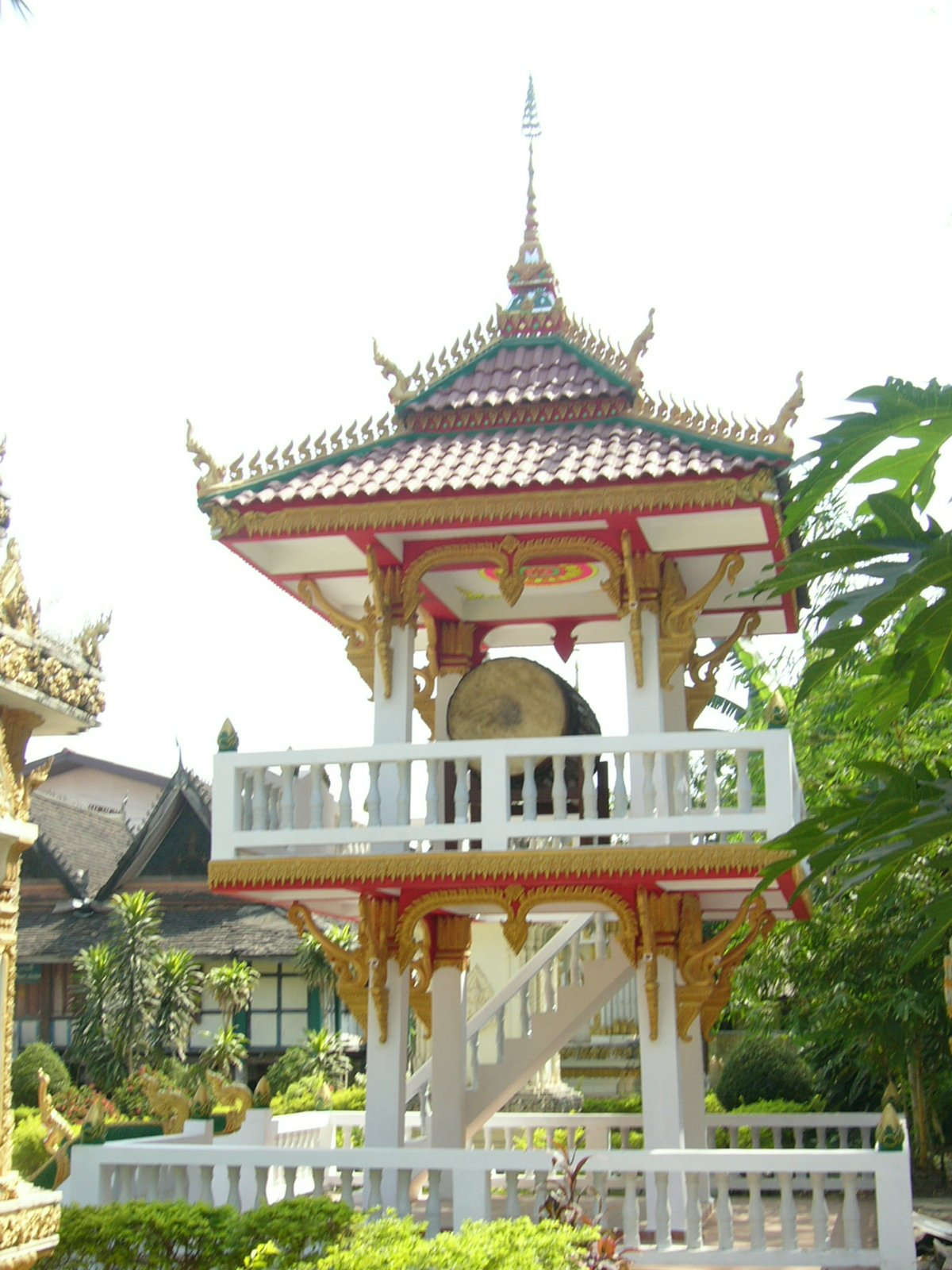
Drum tower in Wat Si Saket, a Buddhist temple in Vientiane, Laos

A drum tower (Chinese: 鼓楼; pinyin: gǔlóu) or gulou is a tower in the center of an old Asian city or village, mainly China, housing signal drums. There was usually also a bell tower nearby.

They were once found all over China in villages, marking the symbolic center of the settlement and used to mark nightfall and to summon the people for civic ceremonies and significant occasions, such as Chinese New Year.

The drum tower often being located in the symbolic center of a city, downtown districts of several Chinese cities have been named after the tower.

== See also ==
- Drum tower (Chinese Buddhism), a different type of drum tower

=== Individual drum towers ===
- Gulou and Zhonglou (Beijing) (Drum Tower and Bell Tower of Beijing)
- Drum Tower of Xi'an
- Drum Tower of Nanjing
- Bianjing Drum Tower
