= Yanggao County =

Yanggao County 阳高县 Yangkao
- County
- Location of the seat in Shanxi
- Coordinates: 40°21′40″N 113°44′56″E
- Country: People's Republic of China
- Province: Shanxi
- Prefecture-level city: Datong
- Time zone: UTC+8 (China Standard)

Yanggao County
- Traditional Chinese: 陽高縣
- Simplified Chinese: 阳高县
- Literal meaning: Sunny Heights County; Yang-Heights County
Transcriptions
Standard Mandarin
- Hanyu Pinyin: Yánggāo Xiàn
- Wade–Giles: Yang-kao Hsien

Former names

Gaoliu
- Chinese: 高柳
Transcriptions
Standard Mandarin
- Hanyu Pinyin: Gāoliǔ
- Wade–Giles: Kao-liu

Yanggao County is a county in the northeast of Shanxi province, China, bordering Inner Mongolia to the northwest and Hebei province to the east. It is under the administration of the prefecture-level city of Datong.

== History ==
Yanggao was formerly known as Gaoliu. Under the Qin and Western Han, it was part of Dai Commandery. Under the Eastern Han, it served as the prefectural seat, although lost this status to Daixian (near present-day Yuzhou in Hebei) during the Three Kingdoms period.

== Climate ==
Climate data for Yanggao, elevation 1,050 m (3,440 ft), (1991–2020 normals, extremes 1981–2010)
Month	Jan	Feb	Mar	Apr	May	Jun	Jul	Aug	Sep	Oct	Nov	Dec	Year
Record high °C (°F)	11.0 (51.8)	18.9 (66.0)	25.0 (77.0)	35.5 (95.9)	35.7 (96.3)	37.6 (99.7)	38.1 (100.6)	34.0 (93.2)	35.5 (95.9)	27.3 (81.1)	20.7 (69.3)	14.3 (57.7)	38.1 (100.6)
Mean daily maximum °C (°F)	−2.8 (27.0)	2.0 (35.6)	9.1 (48.4)	17.3 (63.1)	23.5 (74.3)	27.2 (81.0)	28.4 (83.1)	26.8 (80.2)	22.4 (72.3)	15.2 (59.4)	6.1 (43.0)	−1.2 (29.8)	14.5 (58.1)
Daily mean °C (°F)	−9.7 (14.5)	−5.3 (22.5)	1.9 (35.4)	10.1 (50.2)	16.7 (62.1)	20.7 (69.3)	22.3 (72.1)	20.6 (69.1)	15.2 (59.4)	8.1 (46.6)	−0.5 (31.1)	−7.5 (18.5)	7.7 (45.9)
Mean daily minimum °C (°F)	−15.3 (4.5)	−11.3 (11.7)	−4.5 (23.9)	2.9 (37.2)	9.6 (49.3)	14.1 (57.4)	16.5 (61.7)	14.7 (58.5)	8.7 (47.7)	1.9 (35.4)	−5.9 (21.4)	−12.7 (9.1)	1.6 (34.8)
Record low °C (°F)	−31.8 (−25.2)	−25.7 (−14.3)	−21.4 (−6.5)	−10.3 (13.5)	−2.8 (27.0)	1.0 (33.8)	9.2 (48.6)	4.2 (39.6)	−3.3 (26.1)	−10.5 (13.1)	−25.4 (−13.7)	−29.9 (−21.8)	−31.8 (−25.2)
Average precipitation mm (inches)	2.4 (0.09)	4.4 (0.17)	9.4 (0.37)	18.2 (0.72)	33.9 (1.33)	53.1 (2.09)	100.3 (3.95)	75.3 (2.96)	55.7 (2.19)	21.2 (0.83)	9.1 (0.36)	2.3 (0.09)	385.3 (15.15)
Average precipitation days (≥ 0.1 mm)	1.9	2.7	4.0	4.8	7.3	11.3	13.6	11.5	9.1	5.7	3.2	1.8	76.9
Average snowy days	3.1	4.0	3.9	1.8	0.1	0	0	0	0	0.5	3.6	2.8	19.8
Average relative humidity (%)	49	43	39	36	38	52	66	68	63	55	51	48	51
Mean monthly sunshine hours	192.0	194.1	231.3	249.4	266.4	238.8	235.5	236.2	218.7	221.0	188.6	181.6	2,653.6
Percentage possible sunshine	64	64	62	62	60	53	52	56	59	65	64	63	60
Source: China Meteorological Administration

== See also ==
- Other Gaolius
