= Gaoliu =

Gaoliu may refer to:

- Gaoliu (高柳), a former name of Yanggao, Shanxi, China
- Gaoliu County, a former name of Yanggao County
- Gaoliu, Feixi County (高刘镇), town in Anhui, China
- Gaoliu, Qingzhou (高柳镇), town in Qingzhou, Shandong, China
