= Dai (spider) =

Scientific classification
- Kingdom: Animalia
- Phylum: Arthropoda
- Subphylum: Chelicerata
- Class: Arachnida
- Order: Araneae
- Infraorder: Araneomorphae
- Family: Gnaphosidae
- Subfamily: Gnaphosinae
- Genus: Dai; Liu & Zhang, 2024

Type species
- D. jinchii Liu & Zhang, 2024

Species
- 2, see text

Genus of spiders

Dai is a Chinese genus of spiders in the family Gnaphosidae.

== Etymology ==
The genus is named after the Dai people, which mainly live in the tropical valley areas of Yunnan Province, China, where both species were found. The species D. jijiao is named after "chicken feet" (simplified Chinese: 鸡 爪; traditional Chinese: 雞爪; pinyin: jīzhǎo), a Dai delicacy.

== Distribution ==
Both described species are only known from Yunnan province in China.

== Taxonomy ==
The genus is similar to Smionia Dalmas, 1920.

== Species ==
As of October 2025, this genus includes two species:

- Dai jijiao Liu & Zhang, 2024 – Yunnan
- Dai jinchii Liu & Zhang, 2024 – Yunnan (type species)
