= Dai (Spring and Autumn period) =

Ancient Chinese state

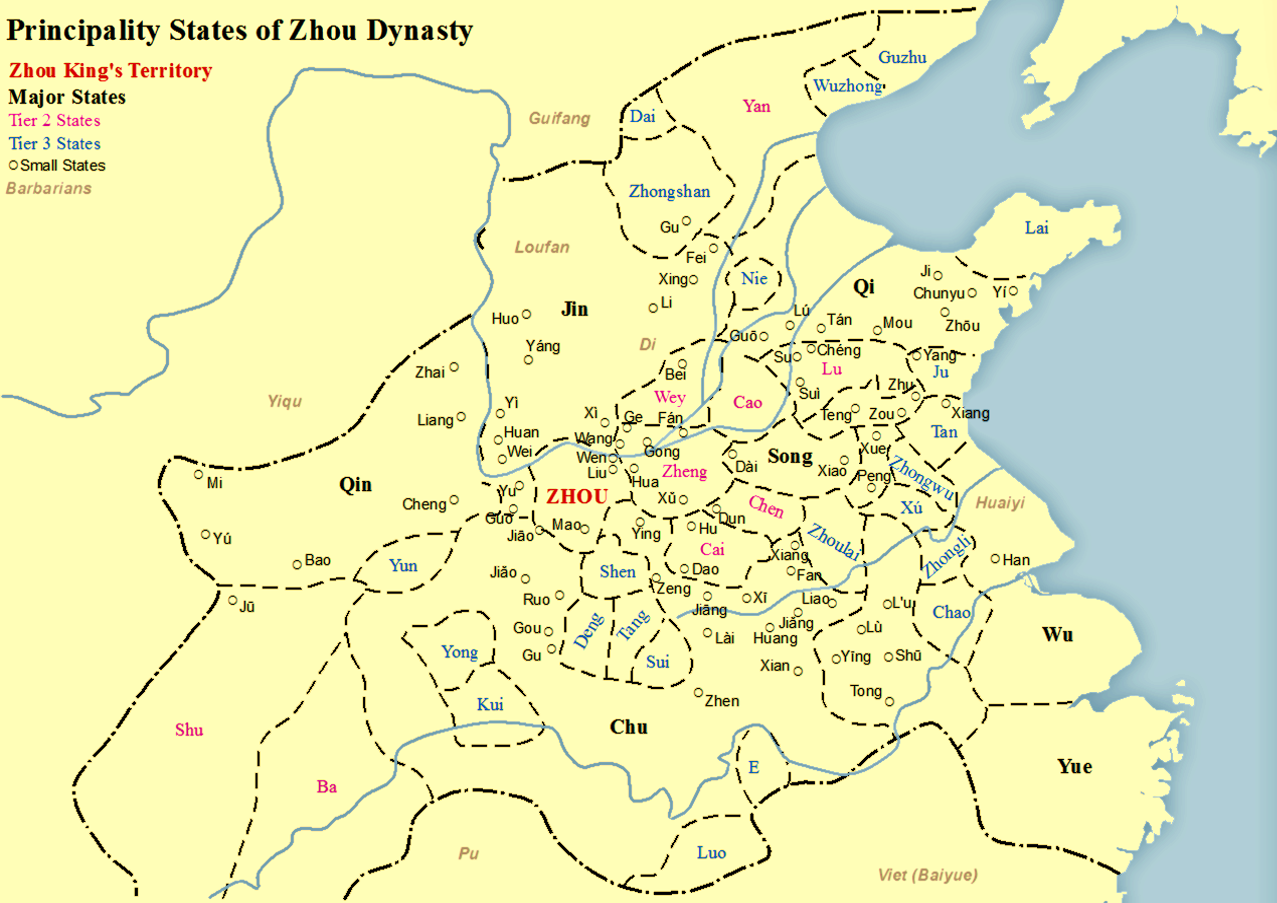
- Constituent States of the Zhou Kingdom. Dai lies in the central north area.
- Traditional Chinese: 代國
- Simplified Chinese: 代国
- Literal meaning: State of Dai
Transcriptions
Standard Mandarin
- Hanyu Pinyin: Dàiguó
- Wade–Giles: Tai-kuo

The ruins of ancient Dai in Yu County, Hebei.

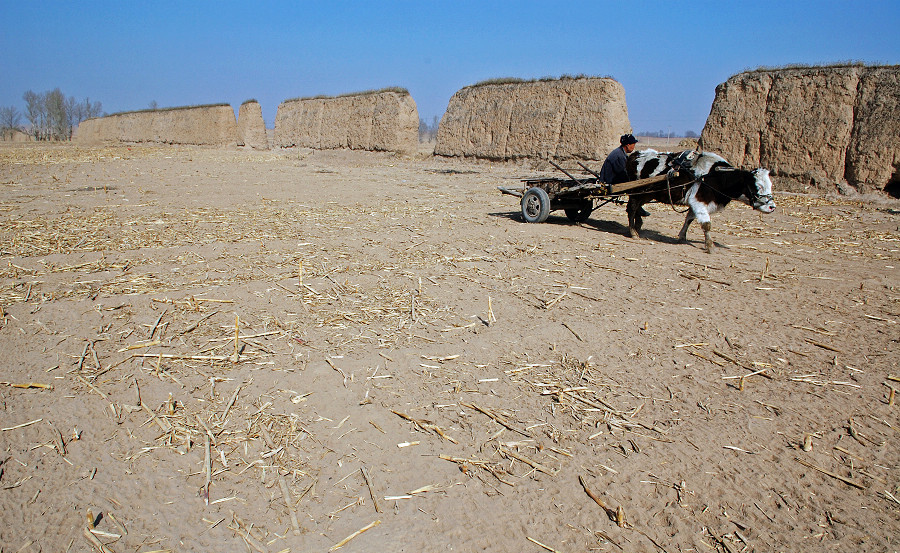
The ruins of ancient Dai in Yu County, Hebei.

Dai was a state which existed in northern Hebei during the Spring and Autumn period of Chinese history. Its eponymous capital was located north of the Zhou Kingdom in what is now Yu County. It was apparently established by the people known to the ancient Chinese as the Baidi or "White Barbarians". They traded livestock and other goods between Central Asia and the Zhou states prior to their conquest by the Zhao clan of Jin.

== Name ==
Dài (pinyin) and Tai (Wade-Giles) are romanizations of the modern Mandarin way of reading the character 代, which is usually a preposition meaning "for", a verb meaning "to stand for" or "represent", or a noun meaning "era". Its original sense in Old Chinese was "to replace", but the kingdom's name was a transcription of the capital's native name; linguistic reconstruction suggests its Old Chinese pronunciation would have been something like /*lˤək-s/.

The northern Rong, wiped out by Zhao c. 460 BC, were also known as the "Dai Rong" (代戎). The unofficial history compendium Lost Book of Zhou mentioned the "Dai Di" (代翟) among the northern neighbors of Shang Chinese.

== History ==
The White Di (Baidi) were recognized as "Northern Barbarians" by the Zhou, although they possessed towns and organized states of the Chinese model like Dai and Zhongshan. The White Di were first recorded living in land west of the Yellow River in what is now northern Shaanxi. They migrated east of the Ordos Loop into the valleys and mountains of northern Shanxi by the 6th century BC, creating states there which were defeated and annexed by the Zhou vassal of Jin and its successor Zhao. The Di continued eastward and founded Dai and Zhongshan in the northwestern corner of the North China Plain in what is now Hebei.

The capital—known as Dai—was located to the northeast of present-day Yu County, Hebei, about 100 miles (160 km) west of Beijing. Its territory included present-day Hunyuan County in Shanxi.

The area inhabitants acted as middlemen between nomads of the Eurasian Steppe and the Chinese states, supplying the latter with furs, jade, and horses. The area's own purebred dogs and horses (t 代馬, s 代马, Dài mǎ) were also well known to the Chinese. Trade passed into Dai territory from the west through the Daoma Pass (t 倒馬關, s 倒马关, Dàomǎ Guān).

The people of Dai were said to be "proud and stubborn, high-spirited and fond of feats of daring and evil", and to disdain practicing trade or agriculture.

Chinese histories record that Zhao Yang (t 趙鞅, s 赵鞅, Zhào Yāng; 517–458 BC), posthumously known as Jianzi (t 趙簡子, s 赵简子, Zhào Jiǎnzi) of Jin's Zhao clan, became ill and was subsequently troubled over which of his sons to name as his heir. He sent them to Mount Chang (Note: During the medieval period, some writers claimed that the princes of Zhao climbed the east terrace of Mount Wutai, overlooking what is now Dai County in Shanxi, although the two territories were only erroneously conflated.) to look for a chop he had placed there; only Prince Wuxu (t 趙毋卹, s 赵毋恤, Zhào Wúxù), his son by a Di slave girl, was able to find it. Wuxu was further the only son to realize that the seal had not been the real point of the father's mission. The true seal of a future realm to be found on the mountain was the country of Dai which it overlooked: "As the top of Changshan overlooks Dai, so Dai could be taken". Despite having bound Zhao to Dai through a marriage alliance, wedding one of his daughters to its king, Zhao Yang approved this insight and named Wuxu his successor. Wuxu would become posthumously known as the "Helpful" (t 趙襄子, s 赵襄子, Zhào Xiāngzǐ).

Shortly after becoming head of the Zhao clan (then still part of Jin), Wuxu invited his brother-in-law, the king of Dai to a feast. The king, whom the Huainanzi describes as a Mohist convert, came with many of the leading men of his country; Wuxu had them massacred. He then swiftly invaded, overran, and annexed the lands of Dai to his realm in 457 BC. His sister the queen of Dai killed herself rather than live under her brother. The expansive territory was given to his nephew Zhou (周, Zhōu).

The Di continued to live in the area after the Zhao conquest. The aftermath of the Zhao conquest is sometimes counted as the first direct contact of the Chinese states with the steppe nomads like the Xiongnu whose threats and invasions shaped much of Chinese history over the next 2,000 years. Later sources record that Zhao even "shared" governance of Dai with "the barbarians" in order to keep it relatively peaceful and to allow invasions against the nomadic Hu, who constantly harassed the area with raids.

== Legacy ==
Dai continued to be used as a name for the surrounding region, eventually becoming the namesake for Dai Prefecture and Dai County in Shanxi. The former site of ancient Dai capital in Yu County, Hebei, is now preserved as "Dai King City" (代王城, Dàiwángchéng), honoring the memory of the Zhao prince Jia who created a rump state at Dai to oppose Ying Zheng of Qin in the several years before his successful unification of China as the Qin Empire.

== See also ==
- Kingdom of Dai, a Zhao successor state in the Warring States period
- Kingdom of Dai, a Zhao successor state in the Eighteen Kingdoms period
- Principality of Dai, an imperial realm and appanage under the Han dynasty
