= Dai Commandery =

Historical region of China

- The ruins of ancient Dai in Yu County, Hebei
- Chinese: 代郡
Transcriptions
Standard Mandarin
- Hanyu Pinyin: Dàijùn
- Wade–Giles: Tai Chün; Tai-chün

Dai Commandery was a commandery (jùn) of the state of Zhao established c. 300 BC and of northern imperial Chinese dynasties until the time of the Emperor Wen of the Sui dynasty (r. AD 581–604). It occupied lands in what is now Hebei, Shanxi, and Inner Mongolia. Its seat was usually at Dai or Daixian (near present-day Yuzhou in Hebei), although it was moved to Gaoliu (present-day Yanggao in Shanxi) during the Eastern Han.

== Name ==
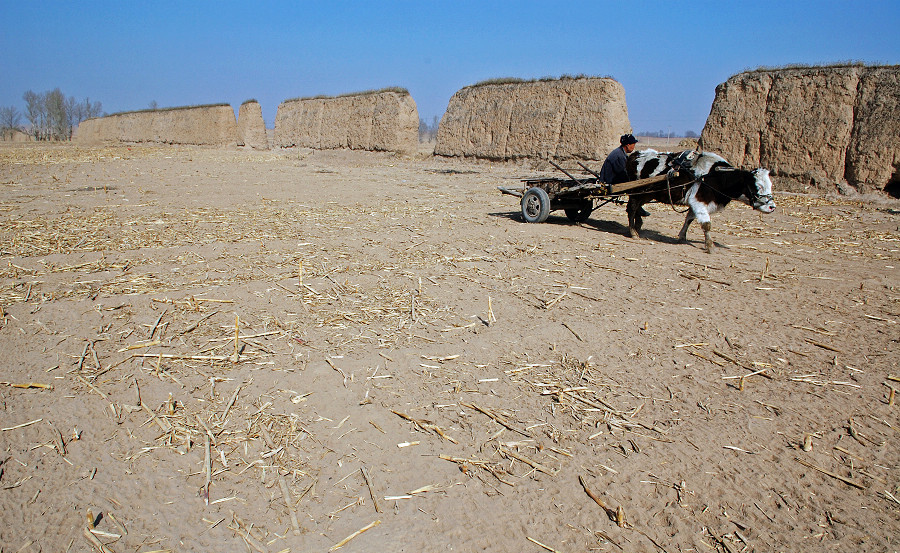
The ruins of ancient Dai in Yu County, Hebei.

The name derives from the White Di kingdom of Dai, conquered by the Zhao family of Jin.

== History ==
=== Zhao Kingdom ===
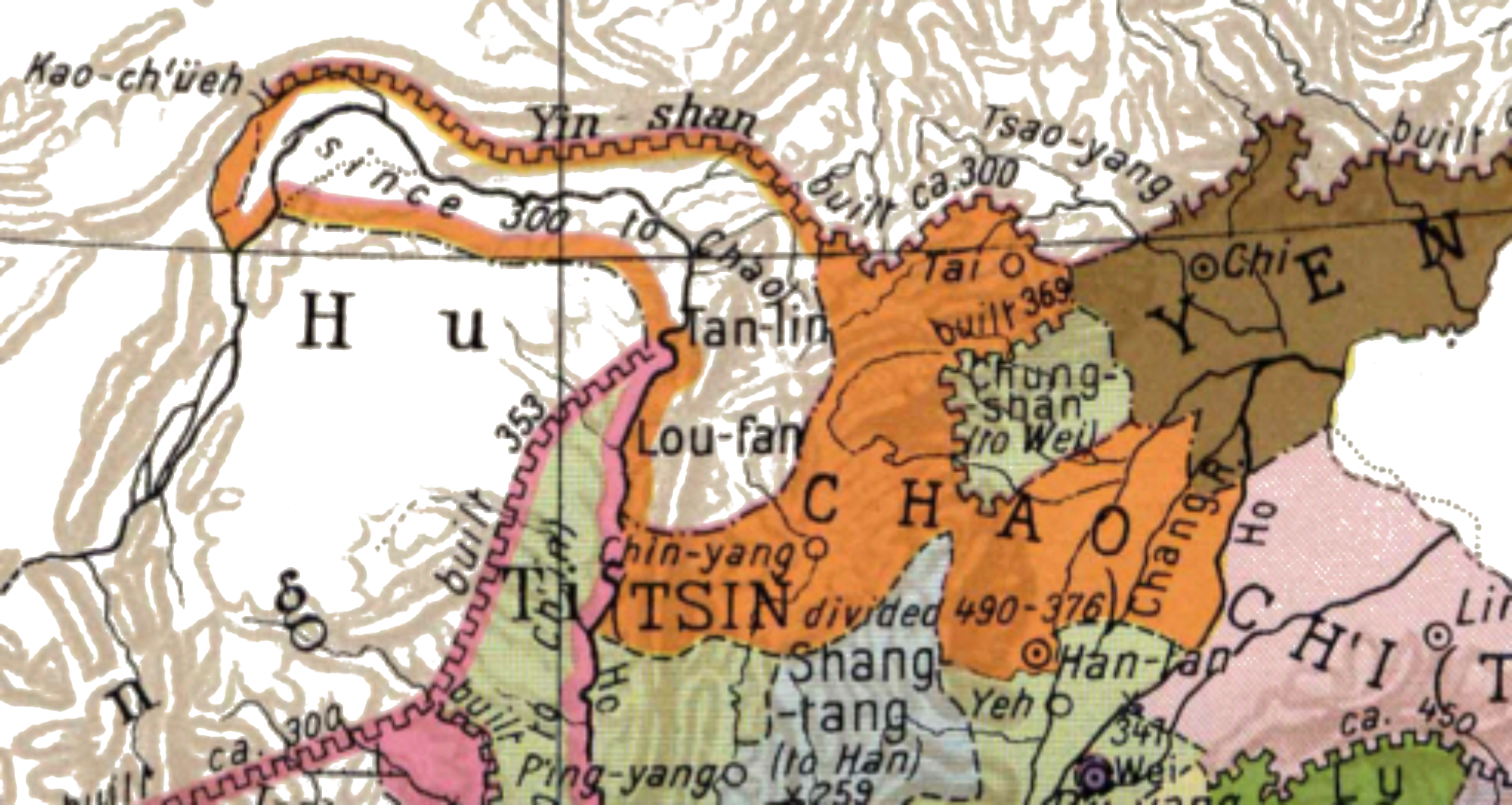
A map of Zhao (w "Chao"), showing the town of Dai (w "Tai") in its northeast. The commandery was organized following King Yong's military reforms and expansion into Loufan and Linhu (shown in outline to the northwest).

Dai Commandery was first established around 300 BC during China's Warring States period by the state of Zhao's King Yong, posthumously known as the Wuling ("Martial-&-Numinous") King. The commandery seat—then known as Dai—was southwest of present-day Yuzhou in Hebei. It was the former capital of the independent state of Dai, which had been conquered by King Yong's ancestors around 476 BC. He created Dai Commandery along with its companion commanderies of Yanmen and Yunzhong to consolidate his conquests from invasions of the Loufan (t 樓煩, s 楼烦, Lóufán) and "forest nomads" (林胡, Línhú) in 306 and 304 BC.

Following the Qin conquest of Zhao, Zhao Jia attempted to regroup at Dai, declaring himself its king. This Kingdom of Dai was ended by Qin in 222 BC, just prior to the declaration of the Qin Empire two years later.

=== Qin Empire ===
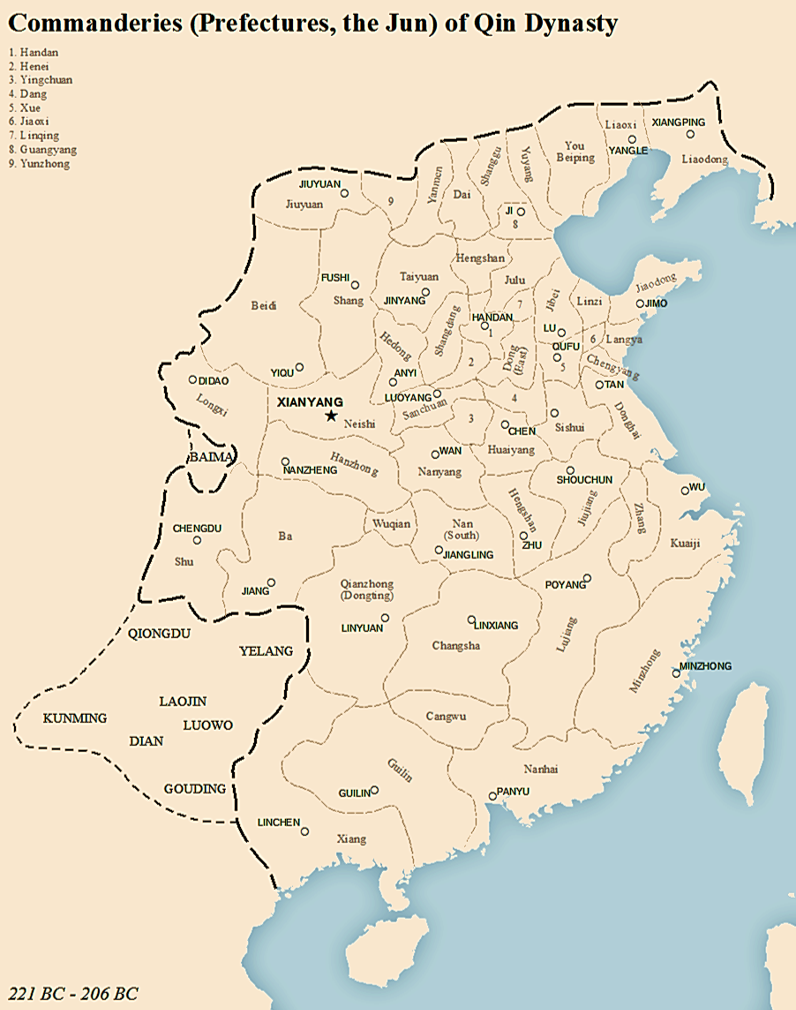
Commanderies of the Qin Empire, with Dai in the central north

Dai Commandery was one of the divisions of the Qin Empire. Its seat—then known as Daixian—continued to be near present-day Yuzhou.

Qin-era counties
English	Chinese		
English	Trad.	Simp.	Pinyin
Dai	代縣	代县	Dài Xiàn
Dangcheng	當城縣	当城县	Dāngchéng Xiàn
Yanling	延陵縣	延陵县	Yánlíng Xiàn
New Pingshu	新平舒縣	新平舒县	Xīnpíngshū Xiàn
Pingyi	平邑縣	平邑县	Píngyì Xiàn
East Anyang	東安陽縣	东安阳县	Dōng'ānyáng Xiàn
Yangyuan	陽原縣	阳原县	Yángyuán Xiàn
Lucheng	鹵城縣	卤城县	Lǔchéng Xiàn
Banshi	班氏縣	班氏县	Bānshì Xiàn
Canhe	參合縣	参合县	Cānhé Xiàn
Gaoliu	高柳縣	高柳县	Gāoliǔ Xiàn
Guangchang (Note: Guangchang is not included in the counties listed by Hou, but appears in Sima Qian's Records of the Grand Historian.)	廣昌縣	广昌县	Guǎngchāng Xiàn
Qieru (Note: Qieru is not included in the counties listed by Hou, but appears in Sima Qian's Records of the Grand Historian.)	且如縣	且如县	Qiěrú Xiàn

=== Eighteen Kingdoms ===
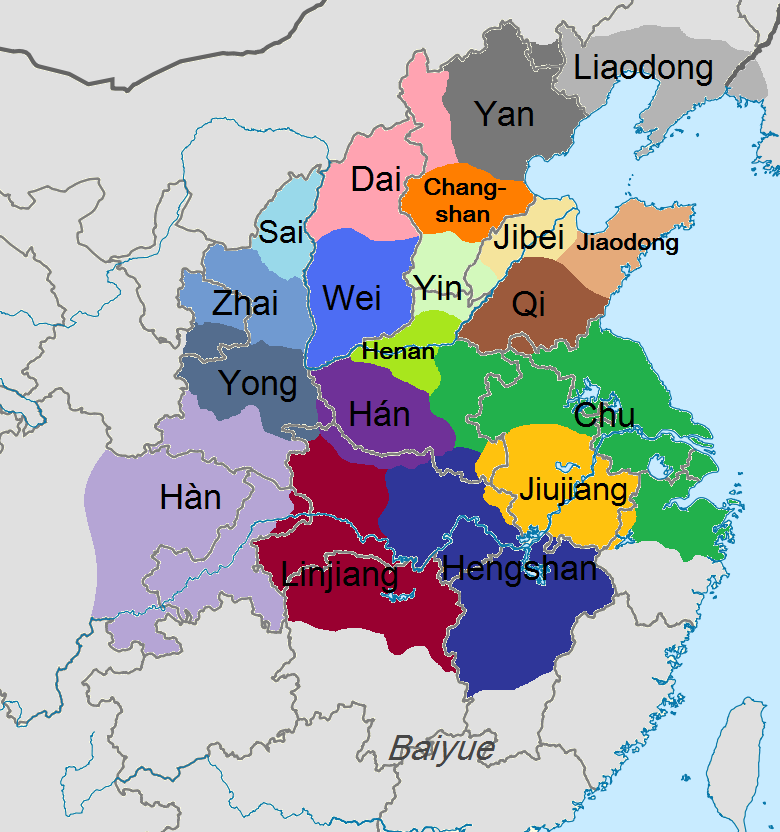
The Eighteen Kingdoms during the Chu-Han Contention period after the fall of Qin

During the interregnum following Qin's collapse, Dai was one of the Eighteen Kingdoms established by Xiang Yu. It was ruled by Zhao Xie and Chun Yu.

=== Western Han Empire ===
Kingdoms and Commanderies of early Han-era China, c. 195 BC

Under the Han, Dai Prefecture formed part of the province of Bingzhou and oversaw 18 counties, both within and beyond the Great Wall. Along with Yunzhong and Yanmen, it also formed part of the Principality of Dai, used as an imperial appanage. The Book of Han records Dai Commandery having 278,754 people living in 56,771 households. The Han administration kept the seat at Daixian near present-day Yuzhou and continued the Qin-era counties (renaming "New Pingshu County" to simply "Pingshu County"), with the addition of:

Additional Han-era counties
English	Chinese		
English	Trad.	Simp.	Pinyin
Sanggan	桑乾縣	桑干县	Sānggān Xiàn
Daoren	道人縣	道人县	Dàoren Xiàn
Macheng	馬城縣	马城县	Mǎchéng Xiàn
Yishi	狋氏縣	狋氏县	Yíshì Xiàn
Lingqiu	靈丘縣	灵丘县	Língqiū Xiàn

=== Xin Empire ===
Under the short-lived Xin dynasty established by Wang Mang, several of the Han counties were renamed.

=== Eastern Han Empire ===
Under the Eastern Han, Dai Commandery formed part of the province of Youzhou. Its seat—then known as Gaoliu—was southwest of present-day Yanggao in northeastern Shanxi.

=== Wei Kingdom ===
During China's Three Kingdoms period, Wei returned the commandery seat to Daixian (near present-day Yuzhou, Hebei).

=== Sixteen Kingdoms ===
During China's Sixteen Kingdoms period, both Later Yan and the Northern Wei had commanderies named Dai. Northern Wei's lay to the west, with its seat at Pingcheng (present-day Datong, Shanxi).

Separate from these, Tuoba Yilu was declared "Duke of Dai" (代公) by the Jin in AD 310 and (vassal) "King of Dai" by the same court in 315. This Xianbei Kingdom of Dai lasted until 376, and its dynasts were responsible for the later state of Northern Wei. It held some lands in northern Shanxi and Hebei but was mostly to their north in what is now Inner Mongolia, with their capital at Shengle (northwest of present-day Horinger).

=== Sui Empire ===
Dai Commandery continued until its abolishment under the Wen Emperor of Sui, who replaced it in 585 with Dai Prefecture, whose seat was at Guangwu or Yanmen (present-day Daixian, Shanxi).
