= Fanshi County =

Fanshi County 繁峙县 Fansze
- County
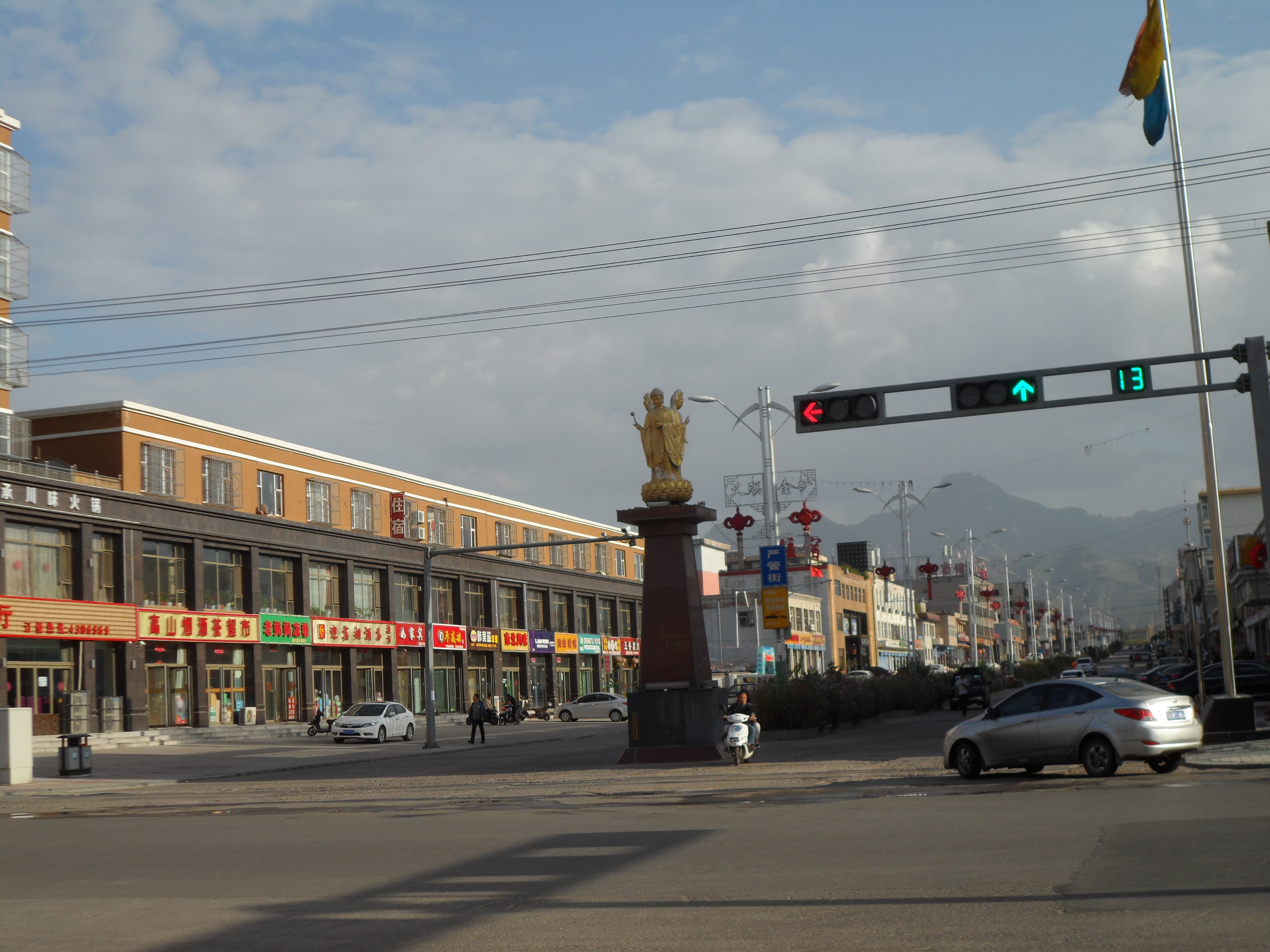

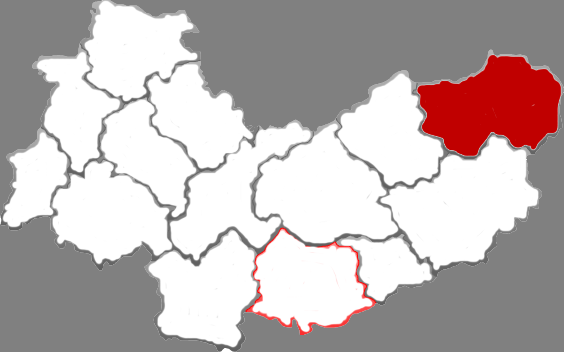
- Location in Xinzhou

- Location of the seat in Shanxi
- Country: People's Republic of China
- Province: Shanxi
- Prefecture-level city: Xinzhou

Population (2020)
  - Total: 250,409
- Time zone: UTC+8 (China Standard)
- Website: fsx.sxxz.gov.cn

Fanshi County
- Simplified Chinese: 繁峙县
- Traditional Chinese: 繁峙縣
Transcriptions
Standard Mandarin
- Hanyu Pinyin: Fánshì Xiàn
- Wade–Giles: Fan-shih Hsien

Fanshi County, is a county in Xinzhou City, in the northeast of Shanxi Province, China, bordering Hebei province to the southeast. It is the easternmost county-level division of Xinzhou.

== History ==
Fanshi County was one of the divisions of Yanmen Commandery under the Qin and Han.

== Geography ==
Fanshi is located north of Mount Wutai and east of Daixian.

== Climate ==
Climate data for Fanshi, elevation 934 m (3,064 ft), (1991–2020 normals, extremes 1981–2010)
Month	Jan	Feb	Mar	Apr	May	Jun	Jul	Aug	Sep	Oct	Nov	Dec	Year
Record high °C (°F)	11.2 (52.2)	17.4 (63.3)	26.4 (79.5)	35.7 (96.3)	36.7 (98.1)	40.9 (105.6)	38.4 (101.1)	35.6 (96.1)	34.6 (94.3)	28.5 (83.3)	20.6 (69.1)	14.0 (57.2)	40.9 (105.6)
Mean daily maximum °C (°F)	0.1 (32.2)	4.1 (39.4)	10.8 (51.4)	18.9 (66.0)	24.9 (76.8)	28.6 (83.5)	29.1 (84.4)	27.6 (81.7)	23.2 (73.8)	16.6 (61.9)	7.9 (46.2)	1.1 (34.0)	16.1 (60.9)
Daily mean °C (°F)	−7.8 (18.0)	−3.8 (25.2)	3.2 (37.8)	11.1 (52.0)	17.4 (63.3)	21.5 (70.7)	23.0 (73.4)	21.3 (70.3)	15.9 (60.6)	8.9 (48.0)	0.6 (33.1)	−6.2 (20.8)	8.8 (47.8)
Mean daily minimum °C (°F)	−13.5 (7.7)	−9.6 (14.7)	−3.2 (26.2)	3.9 (39.0)	10.0 (50.0)	14.9 (58.8)	17.6 (63.7)	15.9 (60.6)	9.9 (49.8)	3.1 (37.6)	−4.6 (23.7)	−11.4 (11.5)	2.8 (36.9)
Record low °C (°F)	−25.7 (−14.3)	−23.1 (−9.6)	−18.8 (−1.8)	−8.1 (17.4)	−2.2 (28.0)	4.9 (40.8)	8.0 (46.4)	5.9 (42.6)	−2.3 (27.9)	−9.5 (14.9)	−24.9 (−12.8)	−25.1 (−13.2)	−25.7 (−14.3)
Average precipitation mm (inches)	1.2 (0.05)	3.3 (0.13)	7.4 (0.29)	18.1 (0.71)	33.7 (1.33)	61.0 (2.40)	108.8 (4.28)	83.7 (3.30)	57.1 (2.25)	25.1 (0.99)	9.1 (0.36)	1.4 (0.06)	409.9 (16.15)
Average precipitation days (≥ 0.1 mm)	1.4	2.6	3.7	5.4	7.4	10.7	12.9	11.2	9.4	6.1	3.4	1.5	75.7
Average snowy days	2.6	4.1	3.6	1.1	0.1	0	0	0	0	0.3	2.8	3.0	17.6
Average relative humidity (%)	46	43	41	41	44	55	70	73	69	60	55	50	54
Mean monthly sunshine hours	182.6	180.7	222.2	244.0	264.0	237.9	229.5	228.8	210.7	203.5	176.1	167.9	2,547.9
Percentage possible sunshine	60	59	60	61	59	53	51	55	57	60	59	58	58
Source: China Meteorological Administration

== Economy ==
The primary industry of Fanshi county is gold mining.
