= Hutuo River =

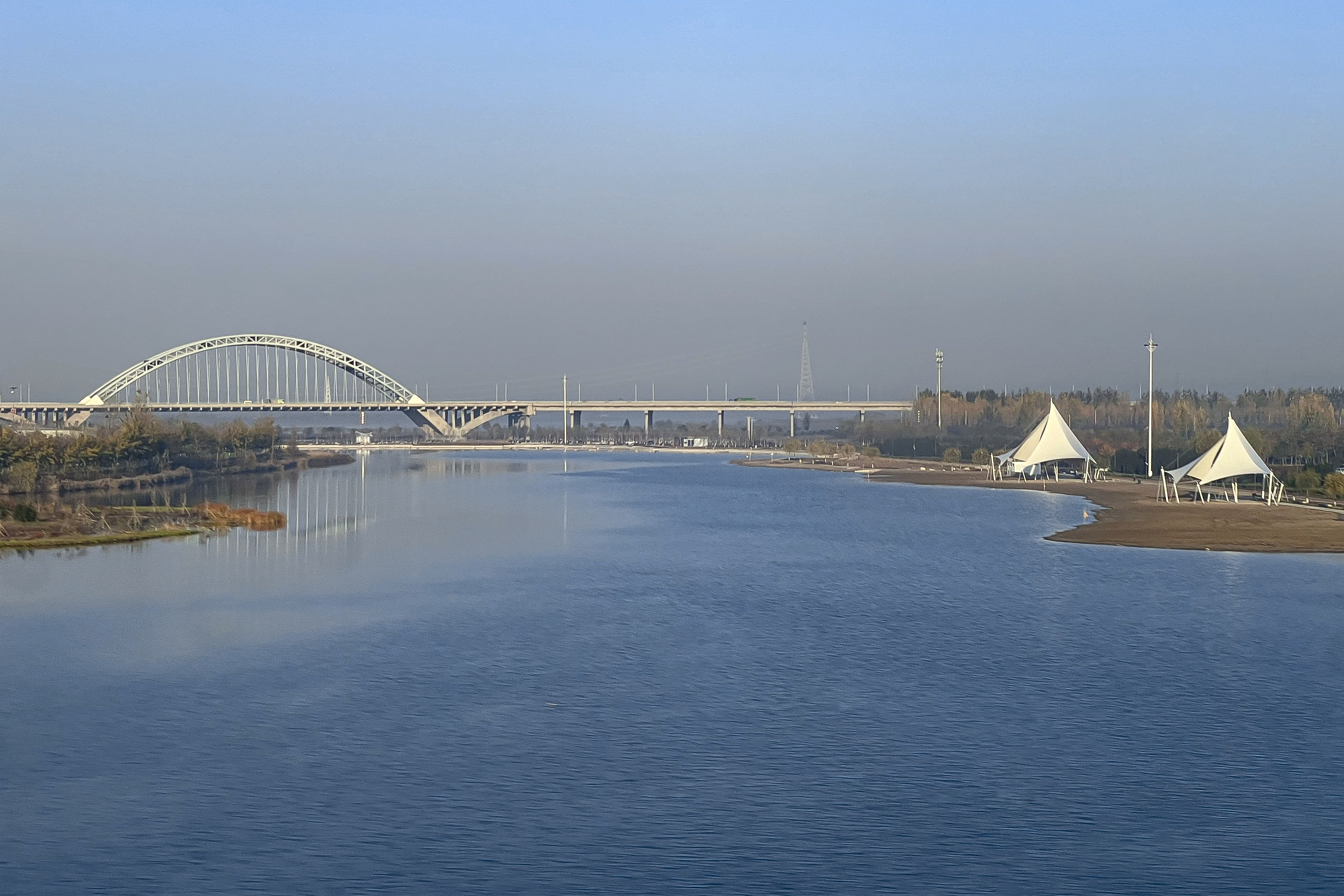

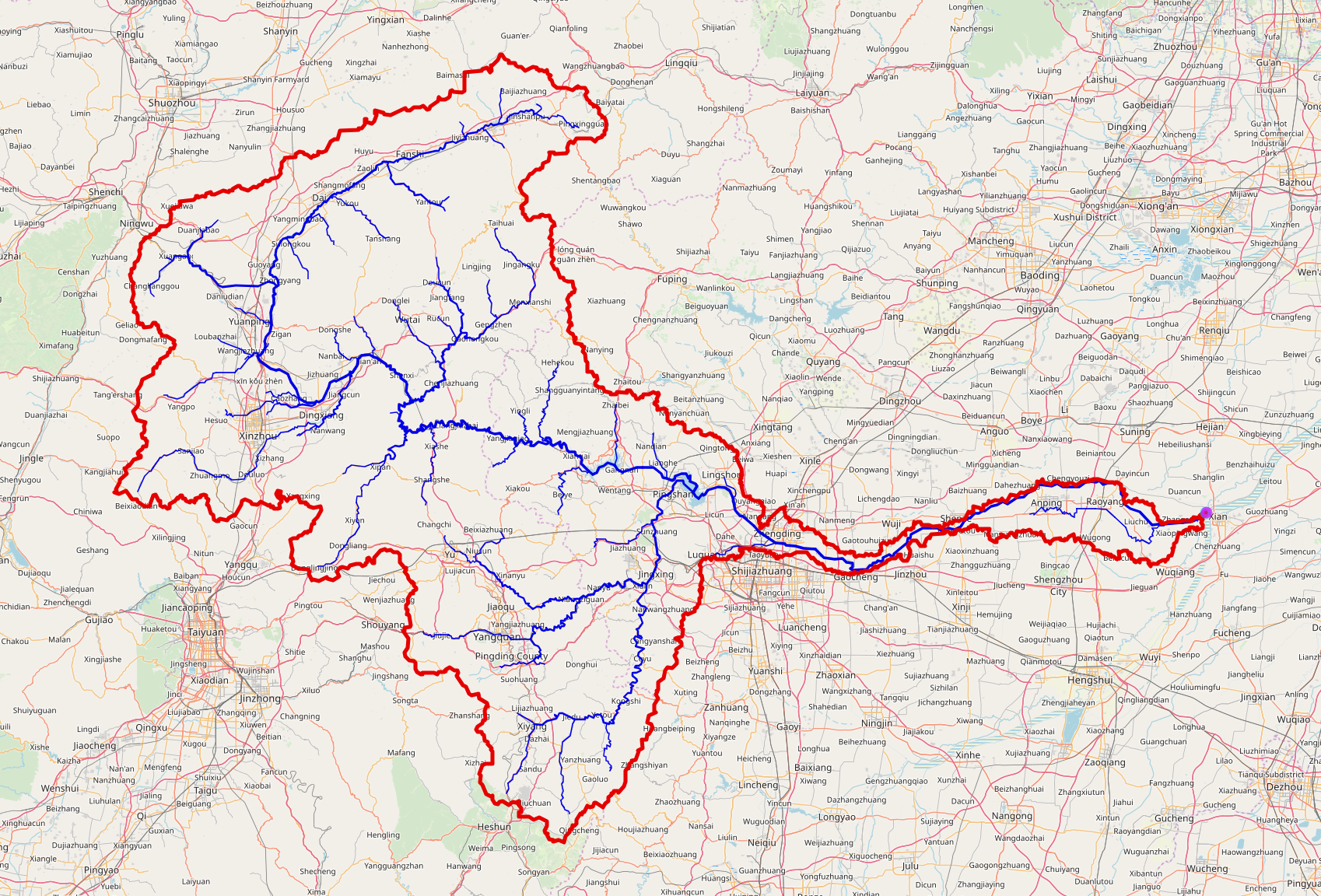
- Native name: 滹沱河 (Chinese)

Location
- Country: China
- State: Shanxi, Hebei
- Region: Northern China
- Cities: Yangquan, Shijiazhuang, Zhengding, Gaocheng

Physical characteristics
- Source: Qiao'ergou Scenic Area (桥儿沟景区)
  - location: Near the Taixi Mountain of Fanshi County, Shanxi Province, Near the Wutai Mountain and Taihang Mountains, China
- Mouth: Ziya River
  - location: Xian County, Hebei Province, North China Plain, China
- Length: 364.7 mi (586.9 km), West-east
- Basin size: 10,540.6 sq mi (27,300 km^{2})
- Discharge
  - average: 243 cu ft/s (6.9 m^{3}/s)

Basin features
- River system: Hai River watershed
- Tributaries
  - left: Qingshui River, Yangwu River
  - right: Zhi River, Fuyang River

The Hutuo River is a major river in northern China and an important member of Hai River system. It derives from Wutai Mountain in Shanxi province and flows through the Taihang Mountains to reach the North China Plain, and meets the Ziya River near the Xian County of the Hebei province, finally meeting the Bohai Bay close to the Haibin and Gangxi residential areas, approximately 50 km south of Tianjin's centre. Other notable areas where it flows through are the city of Shijiazhuang, the capital of Hebei province. The total length of Hutuo River is about 587 km and the watershed area is about 27300 km². The discharge is approximately 220 million cubic meters per year.

The Linji school (sect) of Buddhism, influential in China and Japan, takes its name from a Linji Temple that existed on the shores of the river. The sect was created by the Chan Buddhist monk Linji Yixuan, who joined the temple around 851. The Hutuo river is called Koda by Japanese adepts of the Linji school.
