= Place names in China =

Place names in China primarily refers to Han Chinese names, but also to those used by China's minorities.

== Origins ==
In his study of place-names in China, J. E. Spencer notes that "although Chinese names indicate both domestic cultural and geographical influences, they almost never indicate cultural influence from other parts of the world", a tendency that also appeared to be characteristic of Chinese place-names in Singapore.

Tibetan, Mongolian, Uighur and tribal minorities of China's names are phonetically transcribed into Chinese.

== In Chinese grammar ==
Names for places in China, when referred to in Chinese contain a class identifier. In English this is often translated, while the rest of the name is not. The class identifier in Chinese is placed at the end, in English with the exceptions of mountains and lakes the identifier is placed at the end too. For names of lakes and mountains "X Lake" / "Lake X" and "X Mountain" / "Mount X" both is used.

Some mountain ranges like Tian Shan are referred to English by the Chinese name. "Tian" means sky or heaven and "Shan" means mountain(s), so Tian Shan literally translates as the "Heaven Mountains".

== List of class names ==
E = English, C = Chinese, P = Pinyin

Group	Class (E)	Class (C)	Class (P)	Example (E)	Example (P)
Administrative	Autonomous Region	自治区	Zìzhìqū	Tibet Autonomous Region	Xīzàng Zìzhìqū
Administrative	Province	省	Shěng	Hebei Province	Héběi Shěng
Administrative	County	县 / 縣	-xian	She County, Hebei	Shè Xiàn
Administrative	Province (archaic)	州	-zhou	Guizhou	
Administrative	Autonomous county	自治县	Zìzhìxiàn	Dachang Hui Autonomous County	
Administrative	City	市	Shì	Chengdu City	Chéngdū Shì
Administrative	District	区	Qū	Bincheng District	Bīnchéng Qū
Administrative	League	盟	Méng	Alxa League	Ālāshàn Méng
Administrative	Autonomous banner	自治旗	Zìzhìqí	Evenk Autonomous Banner	Èwēnkèzú Zìzhìqí
Landform	Mountains	山脉		Ailao Mountains	Āiláo Shān
Landform	Mountain	山	Shān	Tianmu Mountain	Tiānmù Shān
Landform	Peak	峰	Feng		
Landform	Island	岛	Dǎo	Liugong Island	Liúgōng Dǎo
Landform	Plateau	草原	Cǎoyuán	Bashang Plateau	Bàshàng Cǎoyuán
Landform	Peninsula	半岛	Bàndǎo	Shandong Peninsula	Shāndōng Bàndǎo
Landform	Valley	沟 (formally 峡)		Insukati Valley	
Landform	Pass	关	Guān	Kunlun Pass	Kūnlún Guān
Landform	Desert	沙漠	Shāmò	Taklamakan Desert	Tǎkèlāmǎgān Shāmò
Landform	Gorge	峡	Xiá	Wu Gorge	Wū Xiá
Landform	Basin	盆地	Péndì	Tarim Basin	Tǎlǐmù Péndì
Landform	Cave	洞	Dòng	Xianren Cave	Xiānrén Dòng
Landform	Plain	平原	Píngyuán	Chengdu Plain	Chéngdū Píngyuán
Landform	Rock	磯/矶	Jī	Swallow Rock	Yànzi Jī
Landform/Water	Glacier	冰川	bīngchuān	Mingyong Glacier	
Landform/Water	Spring	泉	Quán	Baimai Spring	Bǎimài Quán
Landform/Water	Waterfall	瀑布	Pùbù	Hukou Waterfall	Hǔkǒu Pùbù
Landform/Water	River	河	Hé	Huai River	Huái Hé
Landform/Water	River	江	Jiāng	Chang River	Cháng Jiāng
Landform/Water	Lake	湖	Hú	Ayding Lake	Àidīng Hú
Landform/Water	Sea, X Gulf	海	Hǎi	Bohai Sea	Bó Hăi
Landform/Water	Bay	灣	Wān	Bohai Bay	Bóhǎi Wān
Landform/Water	Strait	海峡	Hǎixiá	Taiwan Strait	
Landform/Water	Reservoir	水库	Shuǐkù	Jiangkou Reservoir	Jiāngkǒu Shuǐkù
Landform/Water	Harbour	港	Gang	Hong Kong	Xiānggǎng

== Directions ==
Chinese reckon five directions:

- East: 东, Dong — e.g., Guangdong (广东), "Eastern Part of the Expanse"
- West: 西, Xi — e.g., Xi'an (西安), "Western Pacified Area"
- South: 南, Nan — e.g., Hainan (海南), "South of the Sea"
- North: 北, Bei — e.g., Beijing (北京), "Northern Capital"
- Central/Middle: 中, Zhong —e.g., Hanzhong (汉中), "Middle of the Han"

From the early concept of yin and yang (阴 and 阳), originally based upon exposure to the sun, many placenames also incorporate them. Old Luoyang was located on the north bank of the Luo. Old Hanyang was located on the north bank of the Han, while the eponymous county seat of Hanyin was located on the south bank. When a placename is derived from a mountain, however, these positions are reversed: the yang side is the mountain's south face and the yin side its north.

== See also ==
- Place names of Hong Kong
