= Li Han (scholar) =

Li Han (Chinese: 李瀚) was an 8th-century Confuscian scholar, poet, and official of the Tang dynasty. He wrote the Meng Ch'iu (蒙求; 'Seeking of the Unenlightened'), a book composed of rhyming, four-character compounds describing famous figures from Chinese history and legend used to help students. Among his other writings include On Three Famous Ministers (三名臣論), in which he compared Zhuge Liang and Yue Yi, and he wrote a preface to the Tongdian, an encyclopedia.

== Biography ==
Little is known about Li Han's personal life, beyond that he was an official in the 8th century. Some believe that he was born in 717 in Zanhuang, a son or nephew of Li Hua; others suggested that he was alive in the Later Jin period and died in 962. However, a surviving copy included a dated memorial that showed the latest the Meng Ch'iu could have been written was the Tang period. Other fragments from Dunhuang state that the author was a director of granaries in Xinzhou (modern Jiangxi); however, inconsistencies with the character of the first name make it difficult to determine more about Li Han.

A biography of him was written and existed in the Northern Sung dynasty but no longer survives.

=== Meng Ch'iu ===
The Meng Ch'iu is a collection of rhymed epitomizations of over 600 famous people in earlier Chinese history. The title was derived from the fourth hexagram in the I Ching. It was intended as a primer for younger students who had not yet begun studying classical texts. According to surviving copies of the text, it was presented to the imperial court in c. 746–747 with an introduction by Li Hua which explained that the work "enumerated the beautiful and the foul of the words and deed of men of old and joined them with rhyme in order to instruct children". However the validity of this claim has been questioned given that discrepancies in characters that had been reformed prior to its submission.

The Meng Ch'iu took information from two earlier Tang dynasty works, Accounts of Filial Offspring (孝子傳; Xiaozi Zhuan) and Accounts of Filial Women (孝女傳; Xiaonü Zhuan), the latter of which was compiled by Empress Wu. With the exception of two manuscripts in Japan, none of Accounts of Filial Offspring has survived except as fragmentary references in encyclopedias.

An example of its contents is the four-sinogram phrase 諸葛顧廬, meaning "Zhuge visits cottage". It alludes to a famous event in the Three Kingdoms period in which Zhuge Liang was entrusted with the son of the King of Shu, after which Zhuge wrote a widely acclaimed plea. Much like the other sinograms in the book, the first two characters reference a name while the latter two succicintly describe an action or characteristic the subject is known for.

The Meng Ch'iu remained popular in China until the Yuan dynasty. It was one of the most commonly used primers in the Tang and later periods, alongside the Qianziwen and the Xiaojing. Even after its decline in China, its arrangement and way of presenting didactic information was widely mimicked by later scholars producing new primers, which used meng ch'iu in their titles. Additionally, it was still widely acclaimed and used in Korea and Japan for centuries; it was noted as having been used to educate Imperial Prince Sadayasu, fourth son of Emperor Seiwa. Early copies of the Chinese text were found in border areas of the Chinese-speaking world, such as a sealed library cave near Dunhuang in Gansu, the ruins of Khara-Khoto in Inner Mongolia, and in the pagoda of Fogong Temple in Ying County that dated back to the Liao dynasty.

The Meng Ch'iu was later adapted by a Song dynasty scholar Hsu Tzu-kuang (徐子光) in 1189. It was not recorded in the bibliographic chapters of the New Book of Tang, but is listed in the Song-era Chongweng zongmu. However, the New Book mentions a sequel to the Meng Ch'iu, the Xu Meng Ch'iu compiled by Wang Fan (王範).

The Chinese text survived in a number of early manuscripts, some of which were rediscovered in Chinese scholarly circles by Yang Shoujing during his time in Japan; the copy that he brought back from the Heian period is today kept in the National Palace Museum in Taipei. Other fragments, including those from the Magao caves, were taken back to Paris by Paul Pelliot and are now kept in the Bibliothèque nationale de France.

==== Translations ====
Portions of it were later translated into Japanese as the Mōgyū waka (蒙求和歌) by Minamoto no Mitsuyuki in 1204. Minamoto's translation included some 25 selections from the Meng Ch'iu, each appended with a relevant Japanese poem (waka) that summarizes its essential messages. The Mōgyū, and Japanese versions of the entire text itself, circulated widely in Japan well into the Edo period; allusions to it can be found in works such as the Otome section of Chapter 21 of the Tale of Genji, the novels of Ihara Saikaku, and the poetry of Yosa Buson.

The Meng Ch'iu was one source for the later book Kara Monogatari (Tales of China) by Fujiwara no Shigenori (1135–1177), son of Shinzei.

A modern translation by Burton Watson was published by Kodansha in 1979.
