= George F. Gao =

Chinese virologist and immunologist

Gao Fu
- 高福
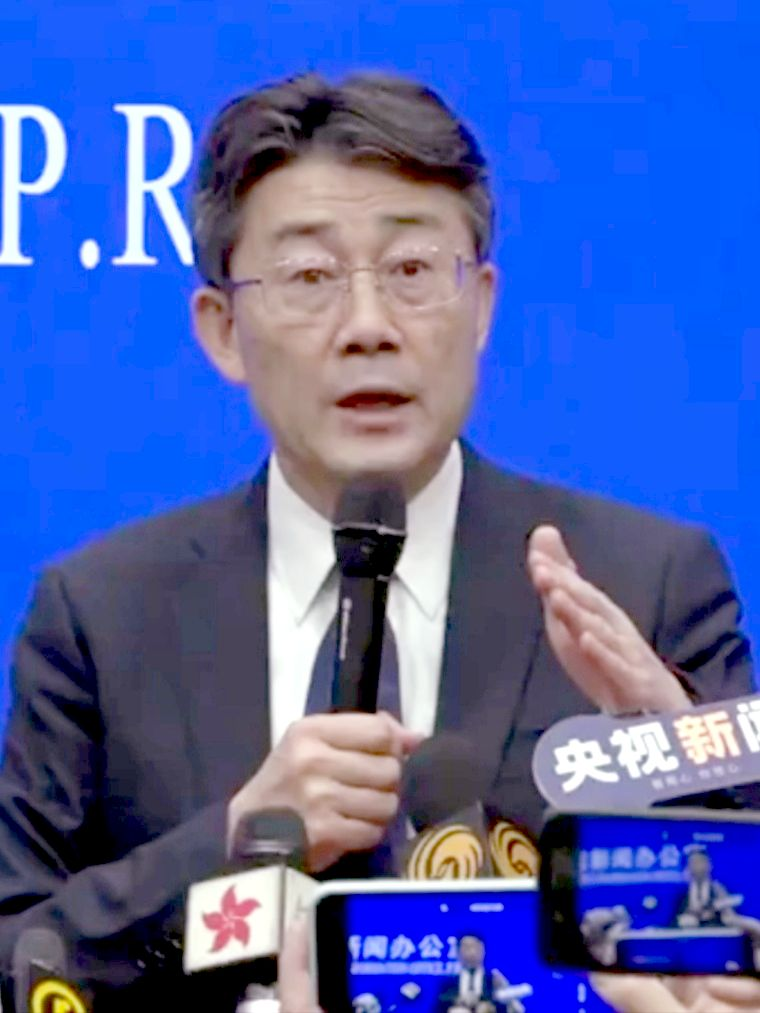
- 26 January 2020, at a press conference on the Covid-19 pandemic.
- Born: 15 November 1961 (age 64); Ying County, Shanxi, China
- Other name: George F. Gao
- Education: Shanxi Agricultural University; China Agricultural University; Oxford University
- Scientific career
- Fields: Virology and immunology
- Workplaces: Institute of Microbiology, Chinese Academy of Sciences; Oxford University; University of the Chinese Academy of Sciences; Harvard Medical School

Gao Fu (Chinese: 高福; pinyin: Gāo Fú; born 15 November 1961), also known as George Fu Gao, is a Chinese virologist and immunologist. He served as Director of the Chinese Center for Disease Control and Prevention from August 2017 to July 2022 and has been Dean of the Savaid Medical School of the University of Chinese Academy of Sciences since 2015.

== Early life and education ==
Gao was born in Ying County, Shuozhou, Shanxi province in 1961. He entered Shanxi Agricultural University and was assigned to study veterinary medicine even though he did not want to be a veterinarian.

After graduating in 1983, he entered the graduate school of Beijing Agricultural University, where he earned a master's degree in microbiology and veterinary epidemiology in 1986. This enabled him to change his career direction to infectious disease research, and he joined the faculty of the university as a teaching assistant and later lecturer in virology.

== Education and career abroad ==
In 1991, Gao went to the United Kingdom to study at Oxford University, where he earned his Ph.D. in biochemistry in 1994 under the supervision of David H. L. Bishop and Ernest A. Gould. After a three-month stint at the University of Calgary in Canada, he returned to Oxford as a postdoctoral researcher, working under John I. Bell, Andrew McMichael and Bent K. Jakobsen.

In 1999, Gao moved to Harvard Medical School as a Wellcome Trust International Travelling Fellow and conducted research under Don Craig Wiley and Stephen C. Harrison until 2001. From 2001 to 2004, Gao taught at Oxford University, serving as a lecturer, doctoral supervisor, and group leader.

== Career in China ==
After 13 years abroad, Gao returned to China in 2004 to serve as Professor and Director of the Institute of Microbiology, Chinese Academy of Sciences (IMCAS). In 2008 he was appointed Vice President of Beijing Institutes of Life Science and Director of the National Key Laboratory of Pathogenic Microorganism and Immunology of the CAS. He has also been an adjunct professor at Oxford since 2010.

Gao was appointed deputy director of the Chinese Center for Disease Control and Prevention in April 2011. He was promoted to Director in August 2017, succeeding Wang Yu (王宇).

In 2015, Gao was appointed Dean of the Savaid Medical School of the University of Chinese Academy of Sciences. He also serves as Vice President of the National Natural Science Foundation of China.

In 2020, Gao contributed to research on SARS-CoV-2.

In July 2022 he was replaced as director of the Chinese Center for Disease Control and Prevention by Shen Hongbing.

== Contributions ==
Gao's main research focus is on the mechanism of viral entry and release, especially the cross-species transmission (host jump) of the influenza virus. He also studies viral ecology, including the ecology of the flu virus in migratory birds and poultry markets. He was the first to describe the cross-species transmission mechanism of the H5N1 avian flu virus.

Gao's research also involves public and global health policy. During the peak of the 2014 Ebola outbreak, he spent two months leading the China Mobile Test Laboratory in Sierra Leone from September to November, playing a role that is described by the US National Academy of Sciences as "heroic" in fighting the epidemic.

As of 2019, Gao has published 20 books or book chapters and over 500 peer-reviewed research papers, including those on newly discovered pathogenic viruses such as the SARS virus and the H7N9 avian flu virus.

== Other activities ==
- Foundation for Innovative New Diagnostics (FIND), Member of the Board of Directors
- GISAID, Member of the Scientific Advisory Council (2016–2022)
- National Natural Science Foundation of China, Vice President

== Honours and recognition ==
- TWAS Prize in Medical Science, 2012
- Academician of the Chinese Academy of Sciences (CAS), December 2013
- Fellow of The World Academy of Sciences (TWAS), 2014
- Nikkei Asia Prize, 2014
- Fellow of the American Academy of Microbiology (AAM), 2015
- Foreign member of the European Molecular Biology Organization (EMBO), 2016
- Fellow of the American Association for the Advancement of Science (AAAS), 2016
- National Award for Distinguished Scientist, 2016
- State Science and Technology Progress Award, 2017
- National Innovation Award, 2017
- Fellow of the Royal Society of Edinburgh (RSE), 2017
- Fellow of the African Academy of Sciences (AAS), 2017
- Academician of the International Eurasian Academy of Sciences, 2018
- Foreign associate of the US National Academy of Sciences, 2019
- Foreign associate of the US National Academy of Medicine, October 2019
- Member of the German Academy of Sciences Leopoldina, 2020

Government offices
Preceded by Wang Yu (王宇)	Director of Chinese Center for Disease Control and Prevention; 2017–2022	Succeeded by Shen Hongbing
