= Youyu County =

Youyu County 右玉县 Yuyu
- County
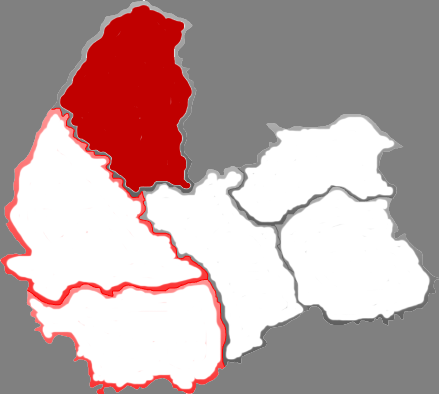
- Youyu in Shuozhou

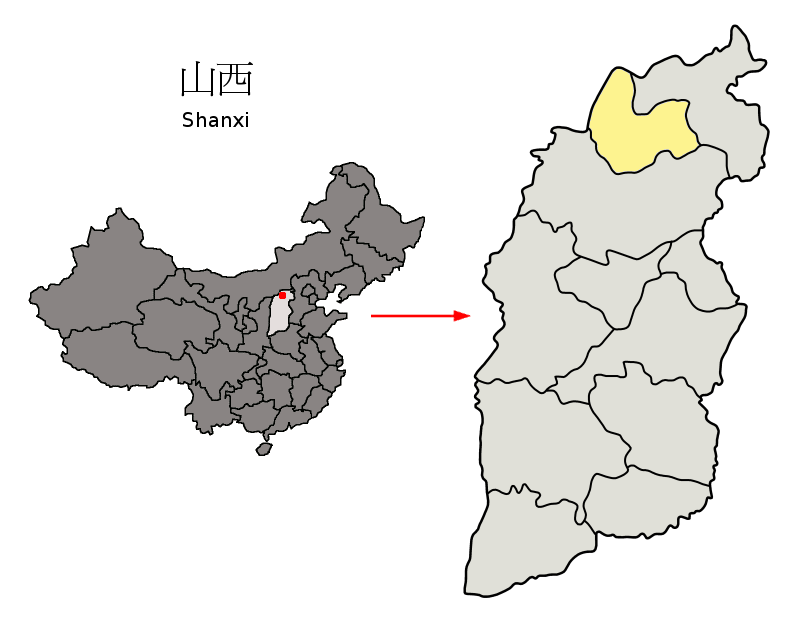
- Shuozhou in Shanxi
- Coordinates: 39°59′20″N 112°28′01″E
- Country: People's Republic of China
- Province: Shanxi
- Prefecture-level city: Shuozhou

Area
  - Total: 1,987 km^{2} (767 sq mi)

Population (2020)
  - Total: 88,212
  - Density: 44.39/km^{2} (115.0/sq mi)
- Time zone: UTC+8 (China Standard)

Youyu County
- Traditional Chinese: 右玉縣
- Simplified Chinese: 右玉县
Transcriptions
Standard Mandarin
- Hanyu Pinyin: Yòuyùxiàn
- Wade–Giles: Yu-yü Hsien

Former names

Shanwu
- Traditional Chinese: 善無
- Simplified Chinese: 善无
Transcriptions
Standard Mandarin
- Hanyu Pinyin: Shànwú
- Wade–Giles: Shan-wu

Yanmen Commandery
- Traditional Chinese: 雁門郡 鴈門郡
- Simplified Chinese: 雁门郡
- Literal meaning: Yanmen Pass Commandery
Transcriptions
Standard Mandarin
- Hanyu Pinyin: Yànménjùn
- Wade–Giles: Yen-mên Chün

Youyu County (Chinese: 右玉县; pinyin: Yòuyù Xiàn), is a county under the administration of the prefecture-level city of Shuozhou, in the northwest of Shanxi Province, China. It borders Inner Mongolia to the north and west.

== History ==
Shanwu, south of present-day Youyuxian, was the seat of Yanmen Commandery during the Qin and Western Han. The post moved to Yinguan southeast of present-day Shuozhou under the Eastern Han and further south to Daixian under the Kingdom of Wei.

== Geography ==
Elevations are generally higher in the south of the county, in which flows the Cangtou River (苍头河); Youyu reaches a north–south extent of 67.7 km (42.1 mi) and east–west width of 45.7 km (28.4 mi). The Great Wall demarcates the northwestern border with Inner Mongolia's Liangcheng and Horinger counties; within the province, Youyu borders Zuoyun County to the east, Shanyin County and Pinglu District to the south.

=== Climate ===
Youyu has a monsoon-influenced, humid continental climate (Köppen Dwb), with cold and very dry winters, and warm, humid summers. The monthly 24-hour average temperature ranges from −14.3 °C (6.3 °F) in January to 19.9 °C (67.8 °F) in July, and the annual mean is 4.2 °C (39.6 °F). June thru September accounts for over three-fourths of the 407 millimetres (16.0 in) of annual precipitation. Due to the high elevation and dry climate, the diurnal temperature variation averages 16 °C (29 °F) annually.

Climate data for Youyu, elevation 1,346 m (4,416 ft), (1991–2020 normals, extremes 1971–2010)
Month	Jan	Feb	Mar	Apr	May	Jun	Jul	Aug	Sep	Oct	Nov	Dec	Year
Record high °C (°F)	8.7 (47.7)	17.8 (64.0)	24.1 (75.4)	32.5 (90.5)	33.4 (92.1)	37.7 (99.9)	37.0 (98.6)	33.1 (91.6)	33.1 (91.6)	26.8 (80.2)	19.5 (67.1)	13.8 (56.8)	37.7 (99.9)
Mean daily maximum °C (°F)	−4.2 (24.4)	0.4 (32.7)	7.3 (45.1)	15.4 (59.7)	21.6 (70.9)	25.7 (78.3)	27.1 (80.8)	25.3 (77.5)	20.5 (68.9)	13.5 (56.3)	4.7 (40.5)	−2.7 (27.1)	12.9 (55.2)
Daily mean °C (°F)	−14.0 (6.8)	−9.2 (15.4)	−1.2 (29.8)	7.0 (44.6)	13.7 (56.7)	18.3 (64.9)	20.2 (68.4)	18.1 (64.6)	12.5 (54.5)	5.0 (41.0)	−3.8 (25.2)	−11.5 (11.3)	4.6 (40.3)
Mean daily minimum °C (°F)	−21.7 (−7.1)	−17.1 (1.2)	−9.1 (15.6)	−1.8 (28.8)	4.6 (40.3)	10.2 (50.4)	13.6 (56.5)	11.7 (53.1)	5.5 (41.9)	−1.8 (28.8)	−10.3 (13.5)	−18.4 (−1.1)	−2.9 (26.8)
Record low °C (°F)	−37.3 (−35.1)	−33.7 (−28.7)	−29.3 (−20.7)	−17.4 (0.7)	−12.6 (9.3)	−2.1 (28.2)	3.0 (37.4)	0.7 (33.3)	−8.0 (17.6)	−14.0 (6.8)	−32.2 (−26.0)	−35.5 (−31.9)	−37.3 (−35.1)
Average precipitation mm (inches)	2.5 (0.10)	4.2 (0.17)	8.8 (0.35)	21.5 (0.85)	41.0 (1.61)	58.2 (2.29)	105.6 (4.16)	94.5 (3.72)	55.8 (2.20)	25.9 (1.02)	8.4 (0.33)	2.1 (0.08)	428.5 (16.88)
Average precipitation days (≥ 0.1 mm)	2.7	3.4	4.7	4.8	6.7	10.7	12.4	12.0	9.3	5.9	3.7	3.0	79.3
Average snowy days	4.4	4.9	4.8	2.2	0.3	0	0	0	0	1.1	4.2	4.7	26.6
Average relative humidity (%)	61	56	48	43	44	55	68	72	69	64	62	61	59
Mean monthly sunshine hours	205.3	205.2	244.4	266.1	285.5	262.9	252.6	244.8	225.9	231.9	205.0	197.0	2,826.6
Percentage possible sunshine	68	67	66	66	64	59	56	58	61	68	69	68	64
Source 1: China Meteorological Administration
Source 2: Weather China
