= Pinglu =

Pinglu may refer to:

- Pinglu County, in Shanxi, China
- Pinglu District, in Shuozhou, Shanxi, China
- Pinglu Canal (平陆运河), under-construction canal in Guangxi
