= Shuozhou Zirun Airport =

Airport in Shanxi, China

Shuozhou Zirun Airport 朔州滋润机场
- IATA: SZH; ICAO: ZBSG

Summary
- Airport type: Public
- Serves: Shuozhou, Shanxi, China
- Opened: 18 December 2023; 2 years ago
- Coordinates: 39°16′23″N 112°41′28″E

Map
- Location of airport in Shanxi

Runways
Direction	Length		Surface
Direction	m	ft	Surface
06/24	2,600	8,530

Shuozhou Zirun Airport
- Simplified Chinese: 朔州滋润机场
- Traditional Chinese: 朔州滋潤機場
Transcriptions
Standard Mandarin
- Hanyu Pinyin: Shuòzhōu Zīrùn Jīchǎng

Shuozhou Zirun Airport (IATA: SZH, ICAO: ZBSG) is an airport located at the junction of Zirun Township and Fushanzhuang Township in Shuocheng district, Shuozhou city, Shanxi province, North China. It was formerly called "Shuozhou Sangganhe Airport" Shuozhou Zirun Airport opened on 18 December 2023. and replaces the now demolished Pingshuo Antaibao Airport.

== Airlines and destinations ==
Airlines	Destinations
9 Air	Guangzhou, Harbin
China Express Airlines	Changsha, Tianjin
Juneyao Air	Shanghai–Pudong

== See also ==
- List of airports in China
- List of the busiest airports in China
