= Huangqi =

Huangqi (Huang-ch’i) can refer to:

- Astragalus propinquus (syn. Astragalus membranaceus) (黄芪), an herb used in Chinese herbology

== China ==
- Huangqi, Xinfeng County, Guangdong (黄磜镇), town
- Huangqi, Fengning County (黄旗镇), town in Fengning Manchu Autonomous County, Hebei
- Huangqi, Lianjiang County (黄岐镇), town in Lianjiang County, Fuzhou, Fujian
- Huangqi Peninsula (黄岐半岛), peninsula in Lianjiang County, Fuzhou, Fujian
- Lake Huangqi (黄旗海), Chahar Right Front Banner, Ulanqab Prefecture, Inner Mongolia, China.
