= Yanmen Commandery =

Historic commandery of China

- Traditional Chinese: 雁門郡 鴈門郡
- Simplified Chinese: 雁门郡
- Literal meaning: Wild Goose Gate Commandery
Transcriptions
Standard Mandarin
- Hanyu Pinyin: Yànménjùn
- Wade–Giles: Yen-mên Chün

Yanmen Commandery was an administrative subdivision (jùn) of the state of Zhao established c. 300 BC and of northern imperial Chinese dynasties until AD 758. It occupied lands in what is now Shanxi and Inner Mongolia. Its first seat was at Shanwu (near present-day Youyu, Shanxi); its later seats moved southeast to the more defensible sites at Yinguan (within present-day Shuozhou, Shanxi) and Guangwu (near present-day Daixian, Shanxi).

== Name ==
The name derives from Yanmen Pass in Shanxi's Dai County. Yanmen, meaning "Wild Goose Pass" or "Wildgoose Gate", takes its name from the wild geese that migrate through the area.

== History ==
=== Zhao Kingdom ===
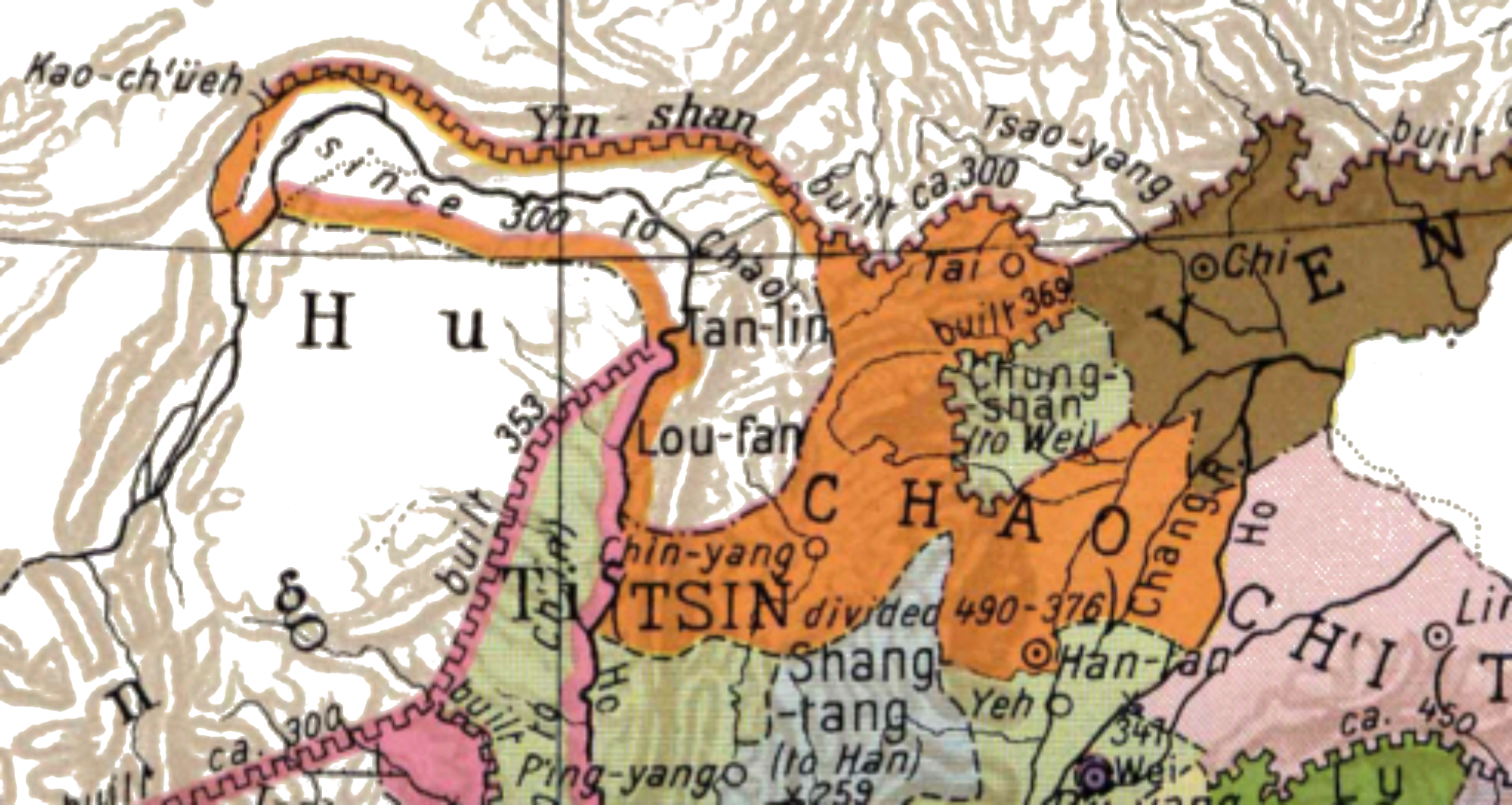
A map of Zhao (w "Chao"). The commandery was organized following King Yong's military reforms and expansion into Loufan and Linhu (shown in outline to the northwest).

Yanmen Commandery was first established around 300 BC during China's Warring States period by the state of Zhao's King Yong, posthumously known as the Wuling ("Martial-&-Numinous") King. It covered territory in what is now northern Shanxi and southern Inner Mongolia. He created Yanmen Commandery along with its companion commanderies of Dai and Yunzhong to consolidate his conquests from invasions of the Loufan (t 樓煩, s 楼烦, Lóufán) and "forest nomads" or "barbarians" (林胡, Línhú) in 306 and 304 BC. He protected these new lands by raising earthen walls along their northern border, close to what is now Hohhot in Inner Mongolia. Garrisons and forts were also placed at strategic spots within the new territory, such as Yanmen Pass between the northern plains and the Hutuo Valley. In the mid-3rd century BC, the Yanmen governor Li Mu, relocated there under the command of Handan used these interior defenses and drills the commandery's citizens to minimize casualties to good effect when he lured more than 100,000 Xiongnu horsemen into the heart of the commandery before defeating them with 160,000 chariots, cavalry, and archers.

=== Qin Empire ===
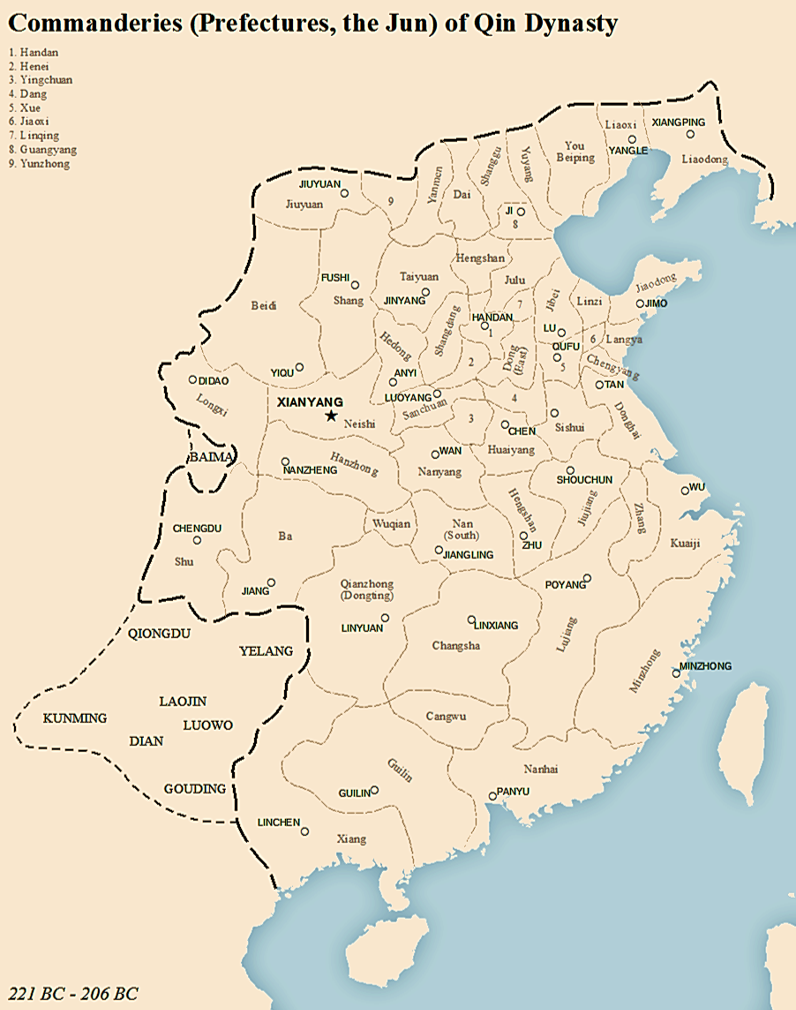
Commanderies of the Qin Empire, with Yanmen in the central north

Under the Qin, Yanmen was one of the commanderies which made up the principal divisions of the empire. Its seat was at Shanwu, south of present-day Youyu in Shanxi. Its territory ran from present-day Shanxi's Hequ, Wuzhai, and Ningwu Counties in the south to Inner Mongolia's Huangqi and Dai Lakes in the north; its eastern border was near Mount Heng. The Zhao wall was connected to those of the other former states as part of the Great Wall. This territory was divided into:

Qin-era counties
English	Chinese		
English	Trad.	Simp.	Pinyin
Shanwu	善無縣	善无县	Shànwú Xiàn
Pingcheng	平城縣	平城县	Píngchéng Xiàn
Mayi	馬邑縣	马邑县	Mǎyì Xiàn
Xincheng	新城縣	新城县	Xīnchéng Xiàn
Loufan	樓煩縣	楼烦县	Lóufán Xiàn
Woyang	沃陽縣	沃阳县	Wòyáng Xiàn
Guo	崞縣	崞县	Guō Xiàn
Fanshi	繁畤縣	繁畤县	Fánshì Xiàn
Wangtao	汪陶縣	汪陶县	Wāngtáo Xiàn
Lie	埒縣	埒县	Liè Xiàn

=== Western Han Empire ===
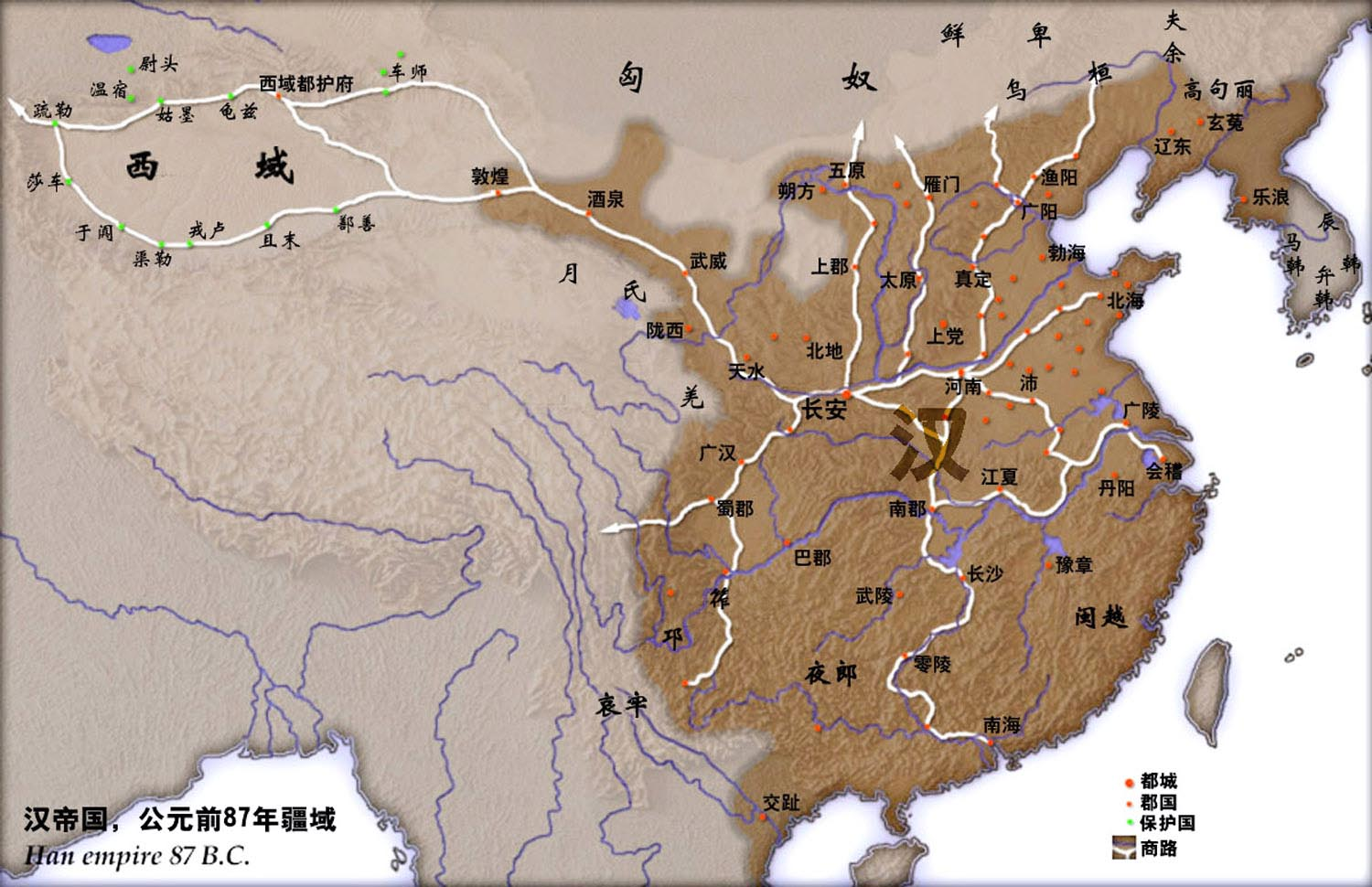
A Chinese-language map of the Han Empire in 87 BC, showing Yanmen (雁门) on the main route north through the valleys of Shanxi

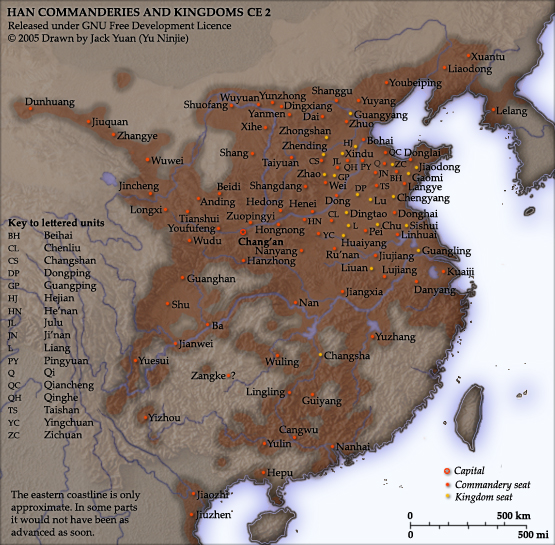
The Han Empire around AD 1

Under the Han, Yanmen Commandery maintained its seat at Shanwu. It was part of the realm of Dai, used as an appanage of the imperial kings and a title of rebels like Han Xin and Chen Xi. Han-era Yanmen included the Qin-era counties above, excluding Xincheng and Wangtao, with the addition of:

Additional Han-era counties
English	Chinese		
English	Trad.	Simp.	Pinyin
Zhongling	中陵縣	中陵县	Zhōnglíng Xiàn
Yinguan	陰館縣	阴馆县	Yīnguǎn Xiàn
Wuzhou	武州縣	武州县	Wǔzhōu Xiàn
Bintao	鬓陶縣	鬓陶县	Bìntáo Xiàn
Juyang	劇陽縣	剧阳县	Jùyáng Xiàn
Qiangyin	彊陰縣	强阴县	Qiángyīn Xiàn

=== Eastern Han Empire ===
Under the Eastern Han, the commandery seat was moved to Yinguan, present-day Xiaguancheng Village southeast of Shuozhou in Shanxi.

=== Wei Kingdom ===
During China's Three Kingdoms period, Wei moved the commandery seat to Guangwu, southwest of present-day Daixian in Shanxi. The district is recorded as having 12,600 households around AD 285.

=== Eastern Wei ===
During China's Northern and Southern dynasties period, Eastern Wei had the commandery seat at Daixian in what is now Shanxi. During the 540s, the district is recorded having 30,434 people living in 6,328 households.

=== Sui Empire ===
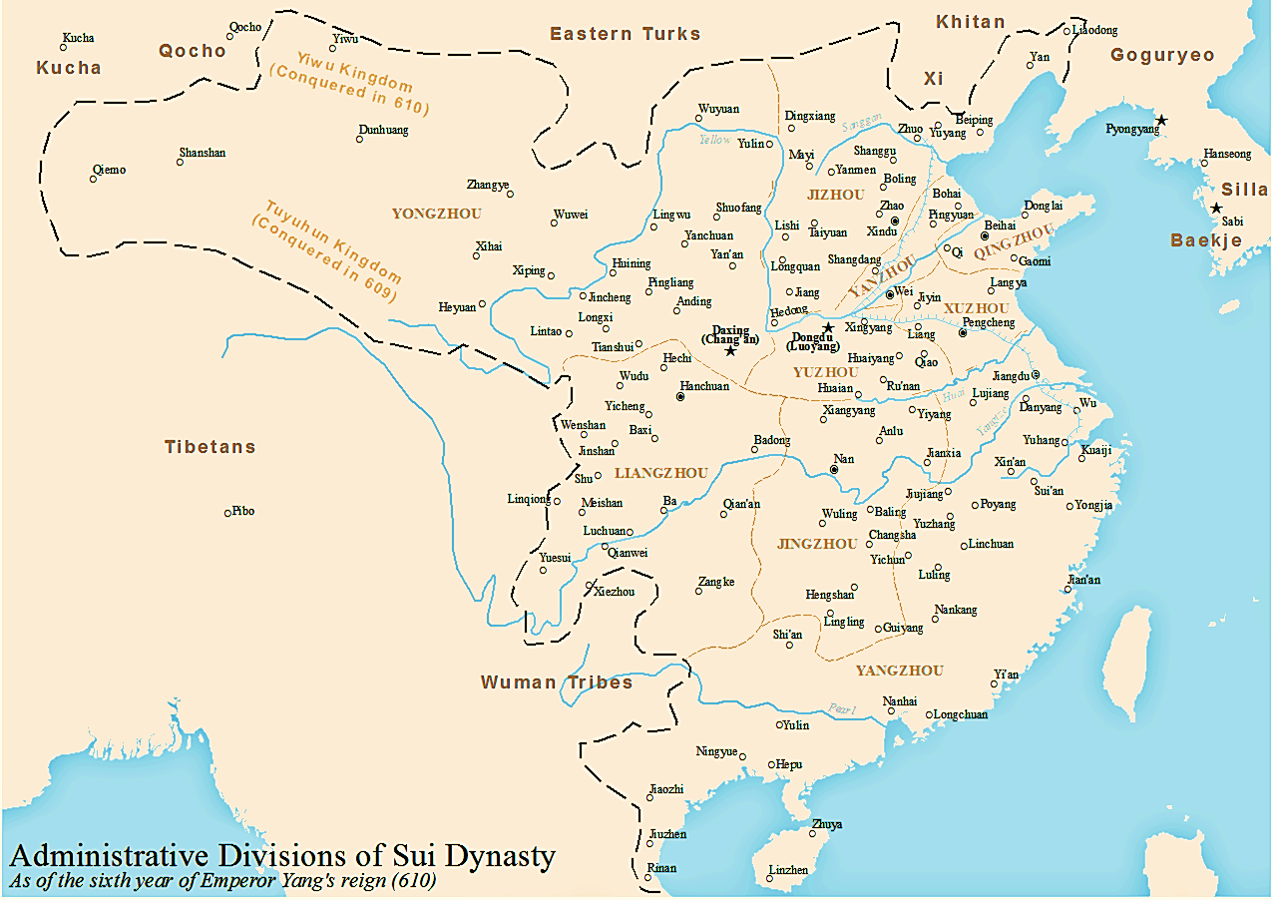
The Sui Empire's district capitals in AD 610. Yanmen lies in the central north.

Under the Sui, Yanmen Commandery was abolished in 583, then revived in 607. It was recorded as having 42,502 households in 609.

=== Tang Empire ===
Under the Tang, Yanmen Commandery was part of Hedong Circuit until it was abolished and replaced by Dai Prefecture in 618, although it was temporarily restored between 742 and 758. During the Tang, the name was retained as an honorary title: the generals Tian Chengsi, Tian Xu, Tian Ji'an, and Wang Zhixing were created "Prince" or "King of Yanmen" (Yànménwáng).

In 882, Yanmen Defense Command (Yanmen Jiedushi) was also briefly established to oversee local defense. It had its seat at present-day Daixian, Shanxi. In 883, its name was changed to Daibei.

== Governors ==
- fl. mid-3rd century BC Li Mu
- c. 318 Wang Ju (王據)
