= Infectious Change =

2016 book by Katherine A. Mason

Infectious Change: Reinventing Chinese Public Health After an Epidemic
- Authors: Katherine A. Mason
- Language: English
- Subjects: Medical anthropology
- Publisher: Stanford University Press
- Publication date: May 2016
- Publication place: United States
- Media type: Print (hardcover, Paperback)
- Pages: 272
- Awards: Foundation for the Sociology of Health & Illness' Book of the Year Prize (2019)
- ISBN: 9780804794435

Infectious Change: Reinventing Chinese Public Health After an Epidemic is a 2016 book by the medical anthropologist Katherine A. Mason, published by Stanford University Press. The book focuses on Severe Acute Respiratory Syndrome (SARS), a flu-like virus, during the 2002–2004 SARS outbreak. Mason discusses Chinese public health institutions in Southeastern China and the status of public health as a profession. The book is the first published ethnography on the Chinese Center for Disease Control and Prevention. The book was awarded the Foundation for the Sociology of Health & Illness' Book of the Year Prize in 2019.

== Description ==
The book draws on thirteen months of ethnographic study conducted from 2008 to 2010 in a city near the China-Hong Kong border that has a large immigrant population. Infectious Change examines the competing interests that have come to shape public health institutions in China since the SARS outbreak, with attention to how the system has turned towards a global focus and become increasingly biomedicalised.

== Reception ==
Yue Yang, reviewing the book in the Chinese Journal of Communication, described it as "an engaging and nuanced ethnographic account of the post-SARS Chinese public health system". Yang wrote that the book "excels in its beautiful descriptions, careful contextualization, and nuanced analyses" and that book "carefully navigates and examines the tensions among past traditions, present scenarios, and future prospects". Yang praised the book for demonstrating that "Chinese modernity did not result from the direct emulation of western modernity" and summarised that "Mason's book shows that Western sciences does not guarantee progress despite its progressive rhetoric or imaginary".

Emilio Dirlikov, writing in Anthropological Quarterly, said that "Mason provides a captivating analysis of public health in China in the wake of SARS". Dirlikov wrote that Infectious Change is "an insightful work" through which "Mason makes a major cocntribution to the literature on public health".

In a review for the Bulletin of the History of Medicine, Robert Peckham described Mason's ethnographic approach as "assiduous" and that Mason "reminds us that a health "system" is an interactive space of overlapping, colliding, and ever-shifting interests". Peckham described Infectious Change as "an excellent, thought-provoking book" that " yields insights that will illuminate broader debates, such as those that pivot on the challenges inherent in promoting the “global” as a category in health.

Christos Lynteris, writing a review for Medical Anthropology Quarterly, called Infectious Change "a much-anticipated contribution to the field" and said that "Mason weaves a convincing and compelling ethnography of the day-to-day operations and relations" in the Chinese Center for Disease Control and Prevention. However, Lynteris said that "the study suffers from a limited historical perspective" and criticised it for not "engaging with the rich anthropological and historical corpus" concerning the 2003 SARS outbreak.

=== Awards ===
- Foundation for the Sociology of Health & Illness' Book of the Year Prize (2019).
