= Lake Dai =

Lake in Inner Mongolia, China

Lake Dai 岱海
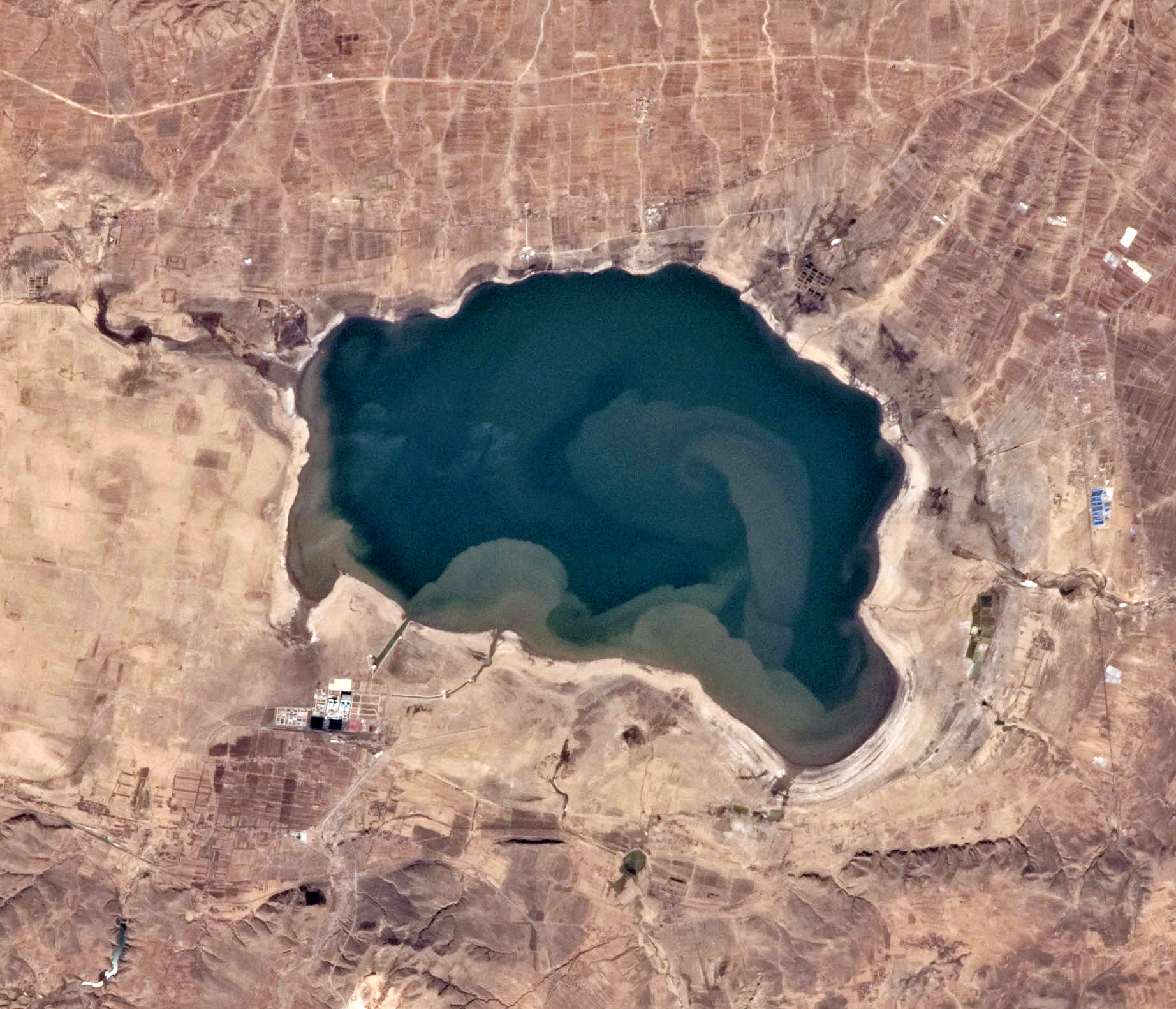
- View of lake taken during ISS Expedition 23

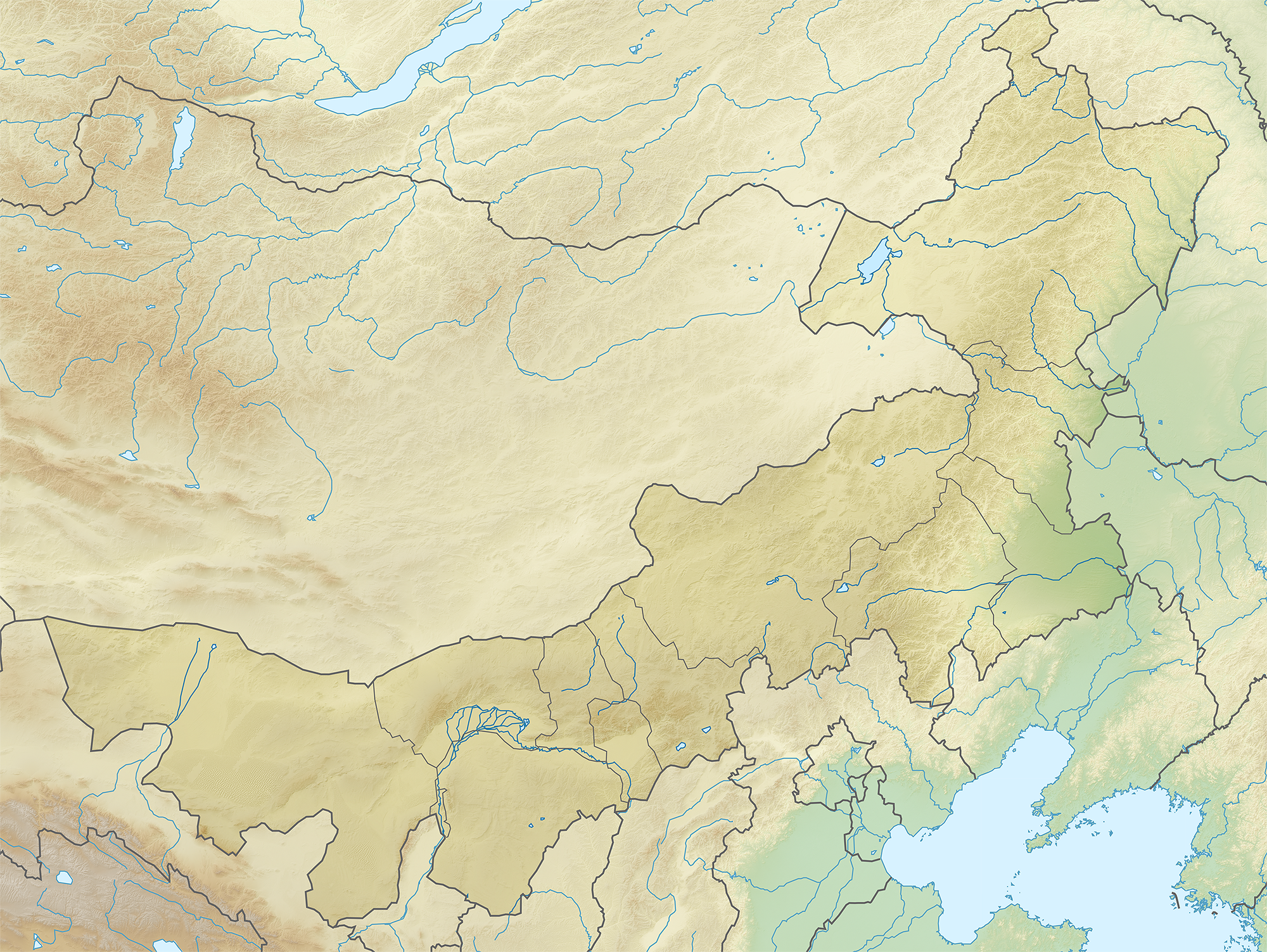
- Location within Inner Mongolia
- Location: Liangcheng County, Ulanqab Prefecture, Inner Mongolia, China
- Coordinates: 40°34′05″N 112°41′22″E
- Basin countries: China
- Max. length: 25 km (16 mi)
- Max. width: 20 km (12 mi)
- Surface area: 160 km^{2} (62 sq mi)
- Average depth: 9 m (30 ft)
- Max. depth: 15–18 m (49–59 ft)

Lake Dai
- Chinese: 岱海
Transcriptions
Standard Mandarin
- Hanyu Pinyin: Dàihǎi
- Wade–Giles: Tai Hai

Lake Dai, also known by its Chinese name Daihai, is a lake in Liangcheng County, Ulanqab Prefecture, Inner Mongolia, China.

== Geography ==
Lake Dai is a round lake with an area of about 160 km^{2} (62 sq mi), measuring about 25 kilometers (16 mi) from east to west and about 20 kilometers (12 mi) from north to south. It has an average depth of about 9 meters (30 ft) and a maximal depth of 15–18 meters (49–59 ft).

== History ==
Under the Qin, Huangqi and Dai lakes formed the northern boundaries of Yanmen Commandery, marking part of the northern frontier of the Chinese empire.
