= Shen Hongbing =

Chinese epidemiologist and oncologist, Director of Chinese CDC

- 沈洪兵
- Born: May 1964 (age 62); Qidong, Jiangsu, China
- Education: Nanjing Medical University; Shanghai Medical College
- Scientific career
- Fields: Oncology, epidemiology
- Workplaces: Nanjing Medical University

Shen Hongbing (Chinese: 沈洪兵; pinyin: Shěn Hóngbīng; born May 1964) is a Chinese epidemiologist and oncologist who has served as director of the Chinese Center for Disease Control and Prevention, since July 2022.

== Biography ==
Shen was born in Qidong, Jiangsu. He received his bachelor's degree in preventive medicine and master's degree in epidemiology from Nanjing Medical University in 1986 and 1989, respectively. In 1999, he obtained a doctor's degree from Shanghai Medical College. He has served as lecturer, associate professor and professor of epidemiology teaching and research at Nanjing Medical University. He was a senior visiting scholar at the University of Texas MD Anderson Cancer Center. From 2014 to 2021, he was president of Nanjing Medical University. From 2021 to 2022, he was deputy director of China's National Administration of Disease Control and Prevention. On 26 July 2022, he was appointed director of the Chinese Center for Disease Control and Prevention.

== Honours and awards ==
- 2009 "Chang Jiang Scholar" (or "Yangtze River Scholar")
- 2013 State Natural Science Award (Second Class)
- 2019 Member of the Chinese Academy of Engineering (CAE)

Government offices
Preceded by Gao Fu	Director of Chinese Center for Disease Control and Prevention; 2022–present	Incumbent
