= Shuozhou =

Shuozhou 朔州市
- Prefecture-level city
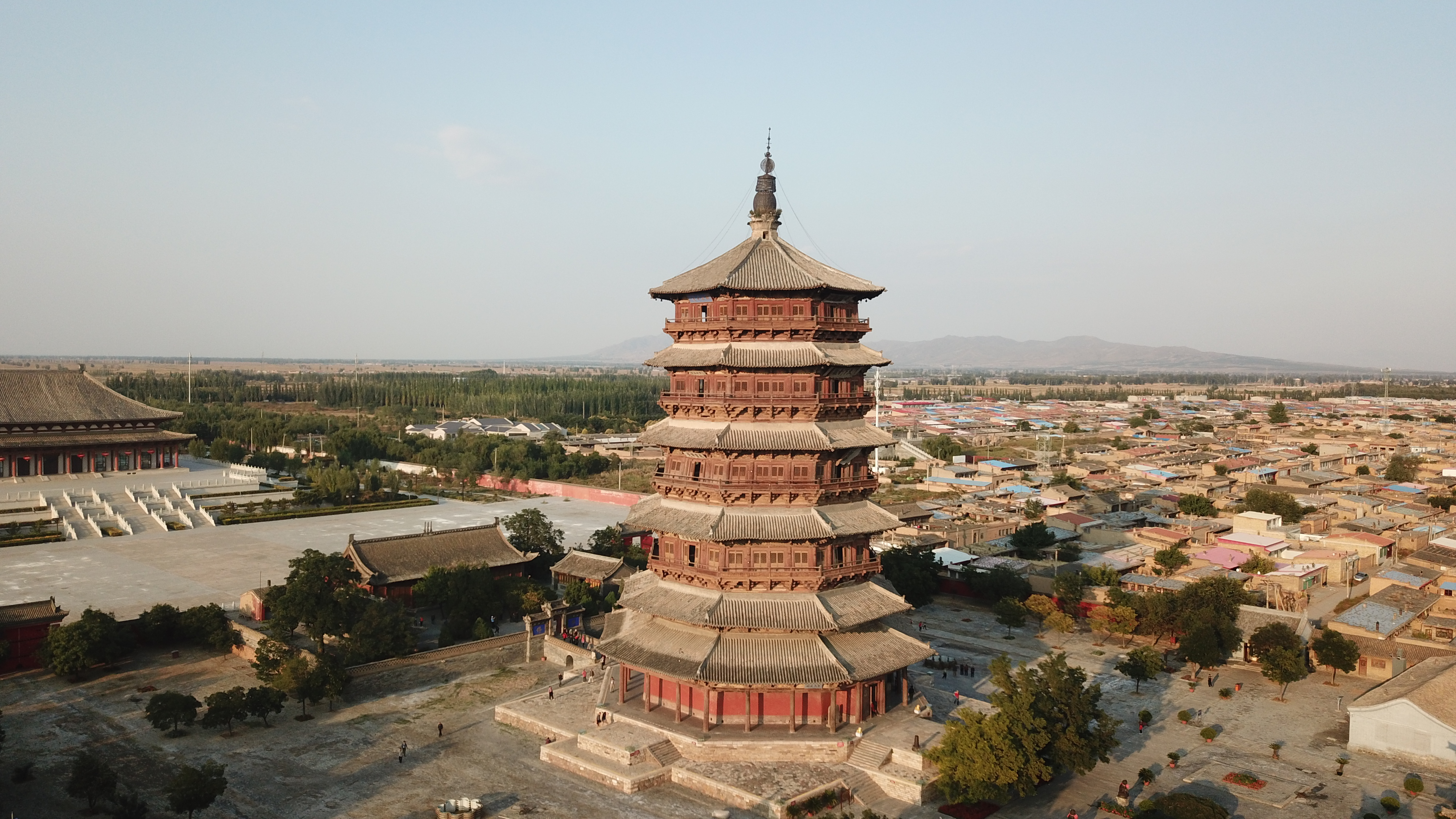
- The Pagoda of Fogong Temple, Ying County, built in 1056.

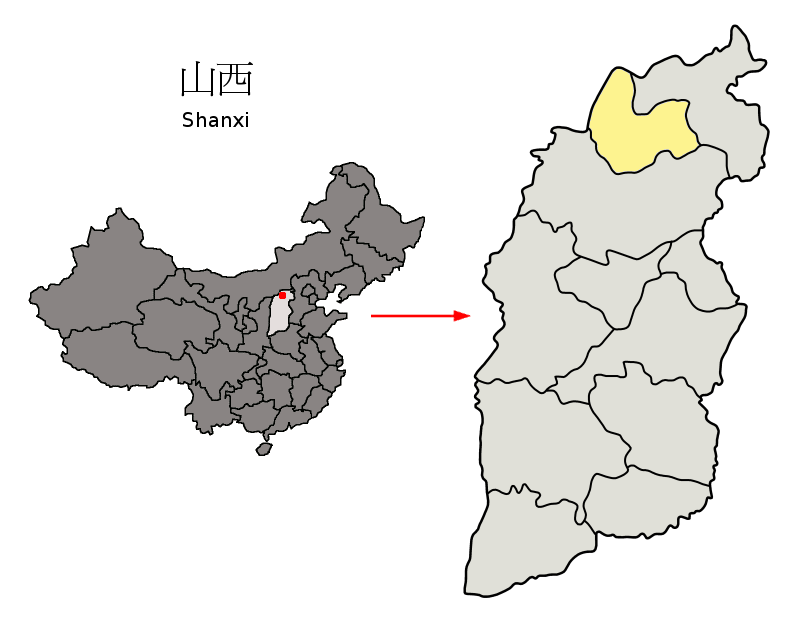
- Location of Shuozhou City jurisdiction in Shanxi

- Shuozhou city center in Shanxi
- Coordinates (Shuozhou municipal government): 39°19′54″N 112°25′58″E
- Country: People's Republic of China
- Province: Shanxi
- County-level divisions: 6
- Municipal seat: Shuocheng District

Government
  - Type: Prefecture-level city
  - CPC Shuozhou Secretary: Wang Maoshe (王茂设)
  - Mayor: Li Zhengyin (李正印)

Area
  - Prefecture-level city: 10,662 km^{2} (4,117 sq mi)
  - Urban: 176.00 km^{2} (67.95 sq mi)
  - Districts: 4,093.7 km^{2} (1,580.6 sq mi)

Population (2010)
  - Prefecture-level city: 1,714,857
  - Density: 160.84/km^{2} (416.57/sq mi)
  - Urban: 433,700
  - Districts: 745,000

GDP
  - Prefecture-level city: CN¥ 110 billion US$ 17.3 billion
  - Per capita: CN¥ 69,152; US$ 11,064
- Time zone: UTC+8 (China Standard)
- Postal code: 036000
- Area code: 0349
- ISO 3166 code: CN-SX-06
- Licence plates: 晋F
- Administrative division code: 140600
- Website: www.shuozhou.gov.cn

Shuozhou
- Chinese: 朔州
- Literal meaning: Seat of Shuo Prefecture
Transcriptions
Standard Mandarin
- Hanyu Pinyin: Shuòzhōu
- Wade–Giles: Shuo-chou

Former names

Mayi
- Traditional Chinese: 馬邑
- Simplified Chinese: 马邑
- Literal meaning: Horse Town
Transcriptions
Standard Mandarin
- Hanyu Pinyin: Mǎyì
- Wade–Giles: Ma-i

Shuozhou is a prefecture-level city in northern Shanxi province, China, bordering Inner Mongolia to the northwest. It is situated along the upper reaches of the Fen River. The prefecture as a whole has an area of about 10,662 km^{2} (4,117 sq mi) and, in 2010, a population of about 1.71 million.

== History ==
The site of Shuozhou was the ancient Chinese frontier town of Mayi (马邑), which was used as a trading post between China and the Xiongnu nomads of the eastern Eurasian steppe.

In 201 BC, the founder of the Han dynasty Liu Bang (posthumously known as Emperor Gaozu or the "High Ancestor") moved Han Xin from his fief around Yuzhou in Henan to Mayi, where he was attacked by the Xiongnu. Finding himself distrusted by the Han emperor, Han Xin allied with the Xiongnu instead and joined them on their raids against China until his death in battle in 196 BC. Mayi was subsequently the capital of Dai Prefecture and the scene of an attempted ambush of the Xiongnu by Chinese troops in 133 BC.

During the chaos between the fall of the Sui and rise of the Tang, Mayi was the base of the would-be emperor Liu Wuzhou.

== Administrative divisions ==
The seat of government is in Shuocheng District, the urban core of the city.

Map
Name	Hanzi	Hanyu Pinyin	Population (2003 est.)	Area (km^{2})	Density (/km^{2})
Shuocheng District	朔城区	Shuòchéng Qū	380,000	1,793	212
Pinglu District	平鲁区	Pínglǔ Qū	190,000	2,314	82
Shanyin County	山阴县	Shānyīn Xiàn	220,000	1,652	133
Ying County	应县	Yìng Xiàn	270,000	1,708	158
Youyu County	右玉县	Yòuyù Xiàn	100,000	1,965	51
Huairen city	怀仁市	Huáirén Shì	250,000	1,230	203

== Climate ==
Shuozhou has a continental, monsoon-influenced semi-arid climate (Köppen BSk), with cold, very dry, and somewhat long winters, and warm, somewhat humid summers. The monthly 24-hour average temperature ranges from −9.8 °C (14.4 °F) in January to 21.9 °C (71.4 °F) in July, and the annual mean is 7.42 °C (45.4 °F). Typifying the influence of the East Asian Monsoon, over three-fourths of the annual 399 millimetres (15.7 in) of precipitation occurs from June to September.

Climate data for Shuozhou, elevation 1,115 m (3,658 ft), (1991–2020 normals, extremes 1981–2010)
Month	Jan	Feb	Mar	Apr	May	Jun	Jul	Aug	Sep	Oct	Nov	Dec	Year
Record high °C (°F)	10.8 (51.4)	19.5 (67.1)	26.0 (78.8)	36.0 (96.8)	35.6 (96.1)	39.3 (102.7)	35.8 (96.4)	34.2 (93.6)	35.1 (95.2)	29.0 (84.2)	22.4 (72.3)	14.7 (58.5)	39.3 (102.7)
Mean daily maximum °C (°F)	−1.1 (30.0)	3.6 (38.5)	10.3 (50.5)	18.2 (64.8)	23.9 (75.0)	27.7 (81.9)	28.7 (83.7)	26.9 (80.4)	22.6 (72.7)	16.0 (60.8)	7.7 (45.9)	0.6 (33.1)	15.4 (59.8)
Daily mean °C (°F)	−9.5 (14.9)	−5.0 (23.0)	2.3 (36.1)	10.3 (50.5)	16.8 (62.2)	20.8 (69.4)	22.4 (72.3)	20.5 (68.9)	15.1 (59.2)	8.1 (46.6)	0.0 (32.0)	−7.2 (19.0)	7.9 (46.2)
Mean daily minimum °C (°F)	−16.1 (3.0)	−12.0 (10.4)	−5.0 (23.0)	2.3 (36.1)	8.5 (47.3)	13.4 (56.1)	16.3 (61.3)	14.5 (58.1)	8.7 (47.7)	1.5 (34.7)	−6.1 (21.0)	−13.3 (8.1)	1.1 (33.9)
Record low °C (°F)	−31.5 (−24.7)	−28.3 (−18.9)	−21.9 (−7.4)	−11.1 (12.0)	−4.3 (24.3)	2.1 (35.8)	5.7 (42.3)	4.2 (39.6)	−4.2 (24.4)	−10.4 (13.3)	−26.2 (−15.2)	−32.0 (−25.6)	−32.0 (−25.6)
Average precipitation mm (inches)	1.6 (0.06)	3.2 (0.13)	8.0 (0.31)	20.8 (0.82)	32.4 (1.28)	60.4 (2.38)	113.3 (4.46)	89.1 (3.51)	60.5 (2.38)	24.3 (0.96)	10.0 (0.39)	1.9 (0.07)	425.5 (16.75)
Average precipitation days (≥ 0.1 mm)	1.7	2.4	3.5	4.9	6.7	10.5	12.9	11.9	9.5	5.9	3.2	1.9	75
Average snowy days	2.9	4.1	3.4	1.3	0.1	0	0	0	0	0.4	2.9	3.0	18.1
Average relative humidity (%)	51	46	41	39	40	51	65	70	66	60	54	52	53
Mean monthly sunshine hours	182.4	183.9	220.2	237.2	255.3	228.2	222.6	215.8	200.0	213.7	187.8	177.5	2,524.6
Percentage possible sunshine	60	60	59	59	57	51	50	52	54	63	63	61	57
Source: China Meteorological Administration

== Economy ==
It is a centre of industry, and its notable industries are primarily mining of coal and other ores such as iron, bauxite, mica, manganese, and graphite. Other economic sectors include agriculture, chemical industry, ceramics, and fishing.

== Education ==
- North University of China at Shuozhou (中北大学朔州校区) http://neuc.nuc.edu.cn/
- Shanxi College of Technology (山西工学院) http://www.sxct.edu.cn/

== Tourism ==
Western tourists rarely come to this area of China, but there are some attractions. The Yingxian Tower, built in 1056 during the Liao Dynasty, is one of the main sites of the region. It was built entirely of wood, without using nails, and serves as a museum of calligraphy. There are also some paleolithic ruins, and ancient gravesites from the Dongyi people.

== Transportation ==
The Dayun Expressway (Datong—Yuncheng) passes through it, and it has 5 specialized train lines.

Shuozhou Zirun Airport opened on December 18, 2023.

== Notable people ==
- George F. Gao, virologist and immunologist.
