= Pagoda of Fogong Temple =

Pagoda in Ying County, Shanxi, China

Coordinates: 39°33′55″N 113°10′55″E

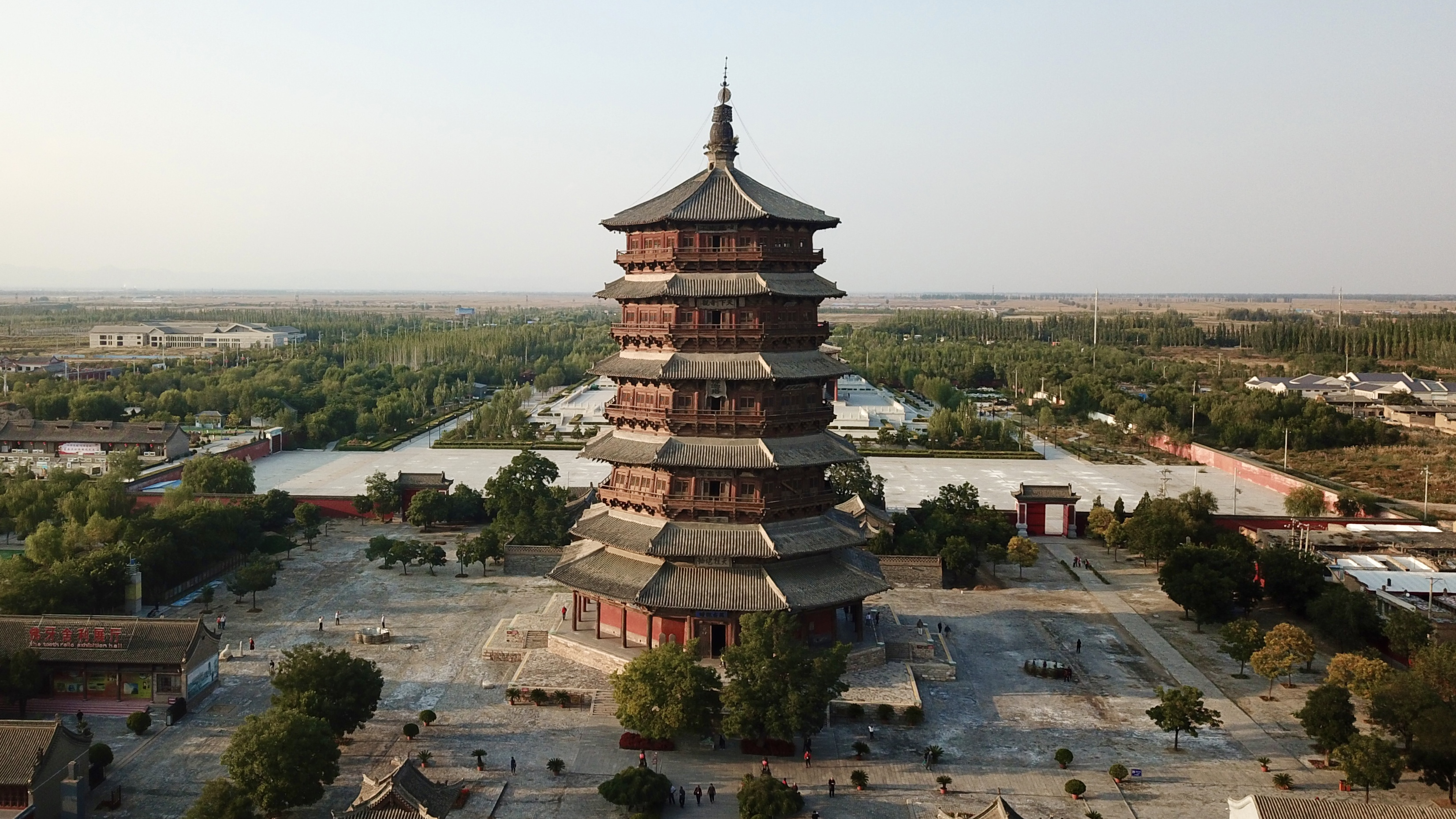
- Front view of the Sakyamuni Pagoda of Fogong Temple

Religion
- Affiliation: Buddhism

Location
- Location: Ying County, Shuozhou, Shanxi, China
- Country: PRC
- Interactive map of Pagoda of Fogong Temple

Architecture
- Type: Chinese
- Completed: 1056–1195

The Sakyamuni Pagoda of Fogong Temple (simplified Chinese: 佛宫寺释迦塔; traditional Chinese: 佛宮寺釋迦塔; pinyin: Fógōng Sì Shìjiā Tǎ) of Ying County, Shanxi province, China, is a wooden Chinese pagoda. It is also known as the Wooden Pagoda of Ying County (Chinese: 应县木塔, pinyin: yìngxiàn mùtǎ). It was constructed in 1056, during the second year of the Khitan-led Liao dynasty and was renovated and expanded in 1195 during the sixth year of the Jin dynasty. The pagoda was built by Emperor Daozong of Liao (Hongji) at the site of his grandmother's family home. The pagoda, which has survived several large earthquakes throughout the centuries, reached a level of such fame within China that it was given the generic nickname of the "Muta" (Chinese: 木塔; pinyin: mùtǎ; lit. 'Timber Pagoda').

The pagoda stands on a 4 m (13 ft) tall stone platform, has a 10 m (33 ft) tall steeple, and reaches a total height of 67.31 m (220.83 ft) tall; it is the oldest existent fully wooden pagoda still standing in China. Although it is the oldest fully wooden pagoda in China, the oldest existent densely-eaved pagoda is the 6th century Songyue Pagoda (made of bricks) and many much older stone pagodas exists in the entire North China Plain (e.g. the Zushi Pagoda of the Foguang Temple and the Four Gates Pagoda of Jinan); the oldest existent wooden buildings in China are the Buddhist temple halls found in Wutai County on the westside of the Mount Wutai, which date back to the mid Tang dynasty (618–907).

== History ==
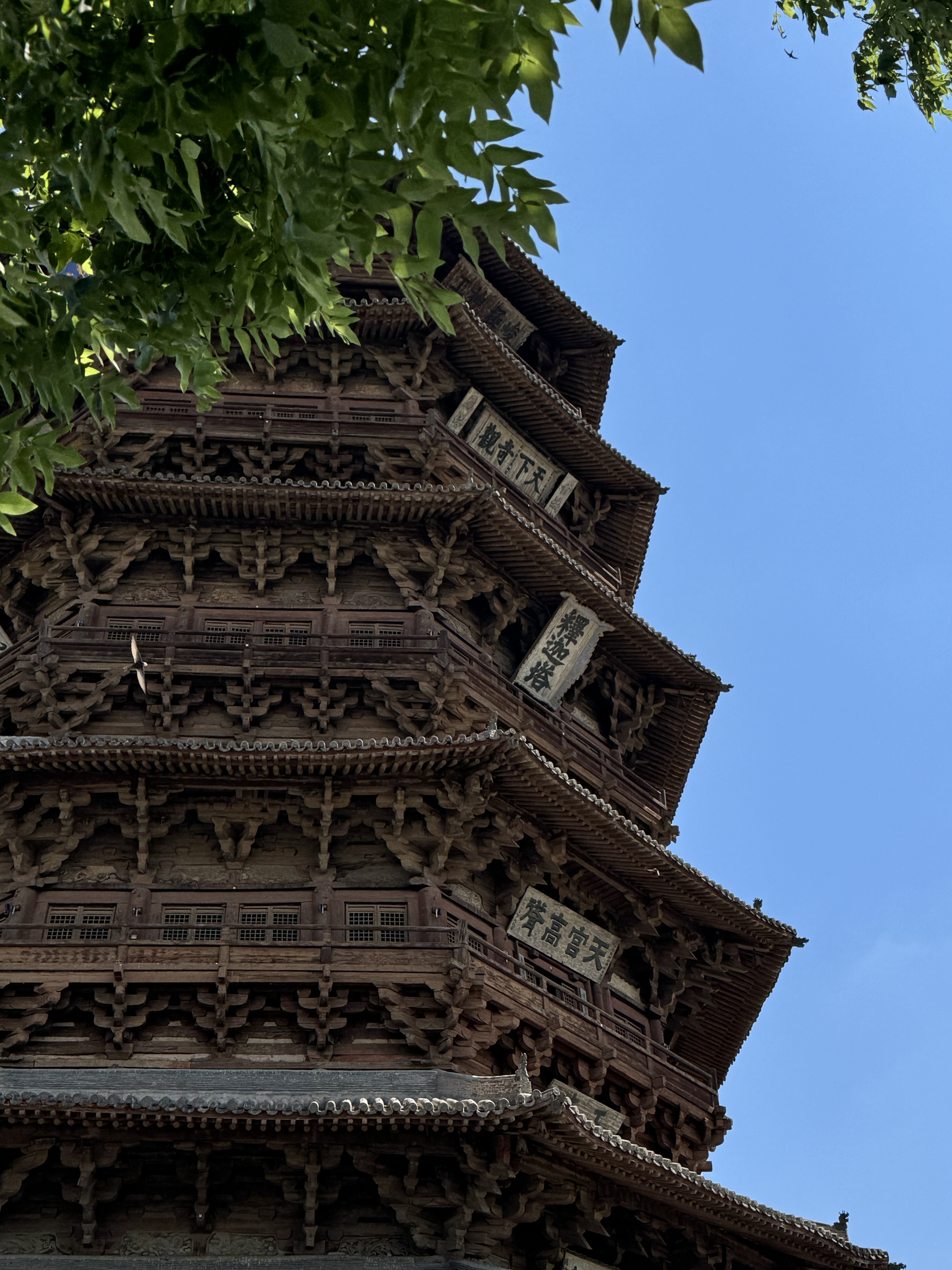
Detail of the dougong supports of the pagoda

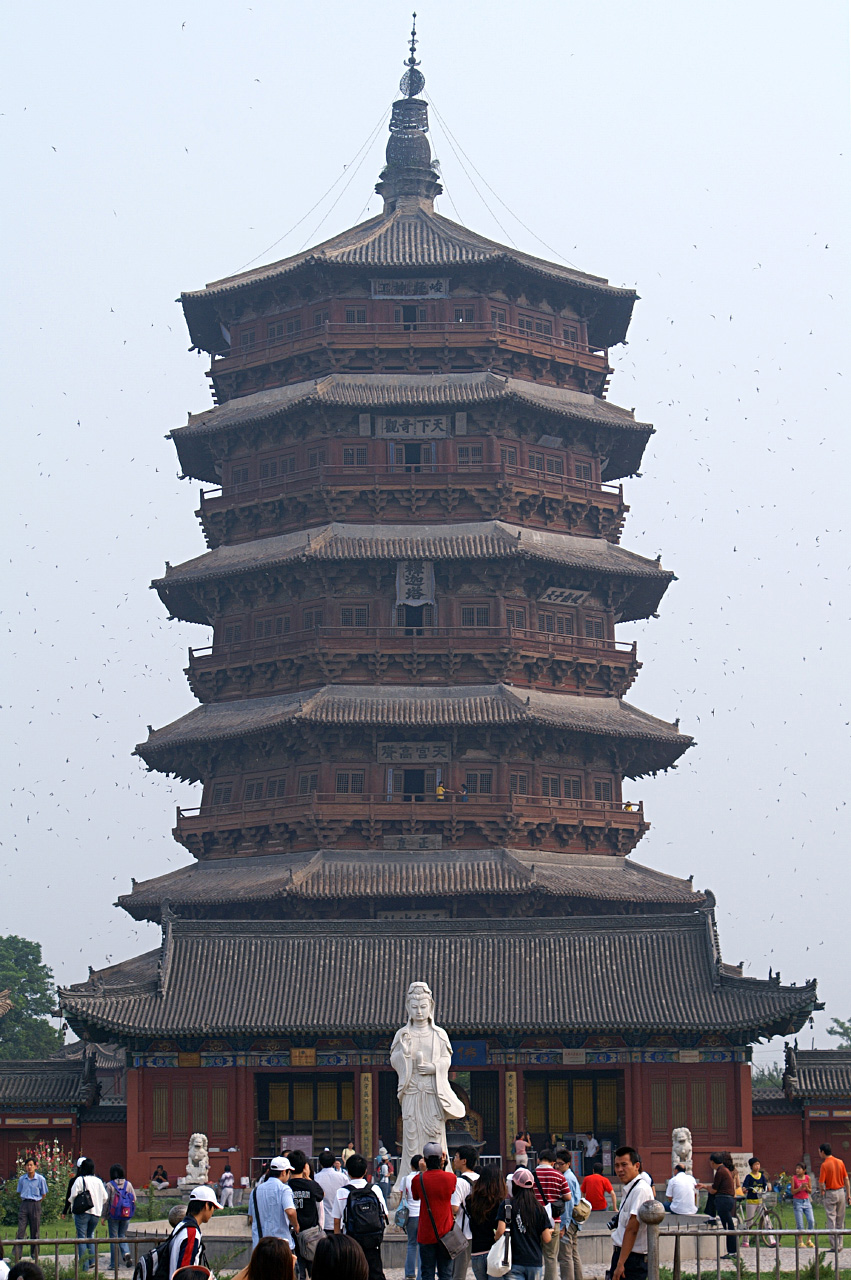
The pagoda and temple grounds

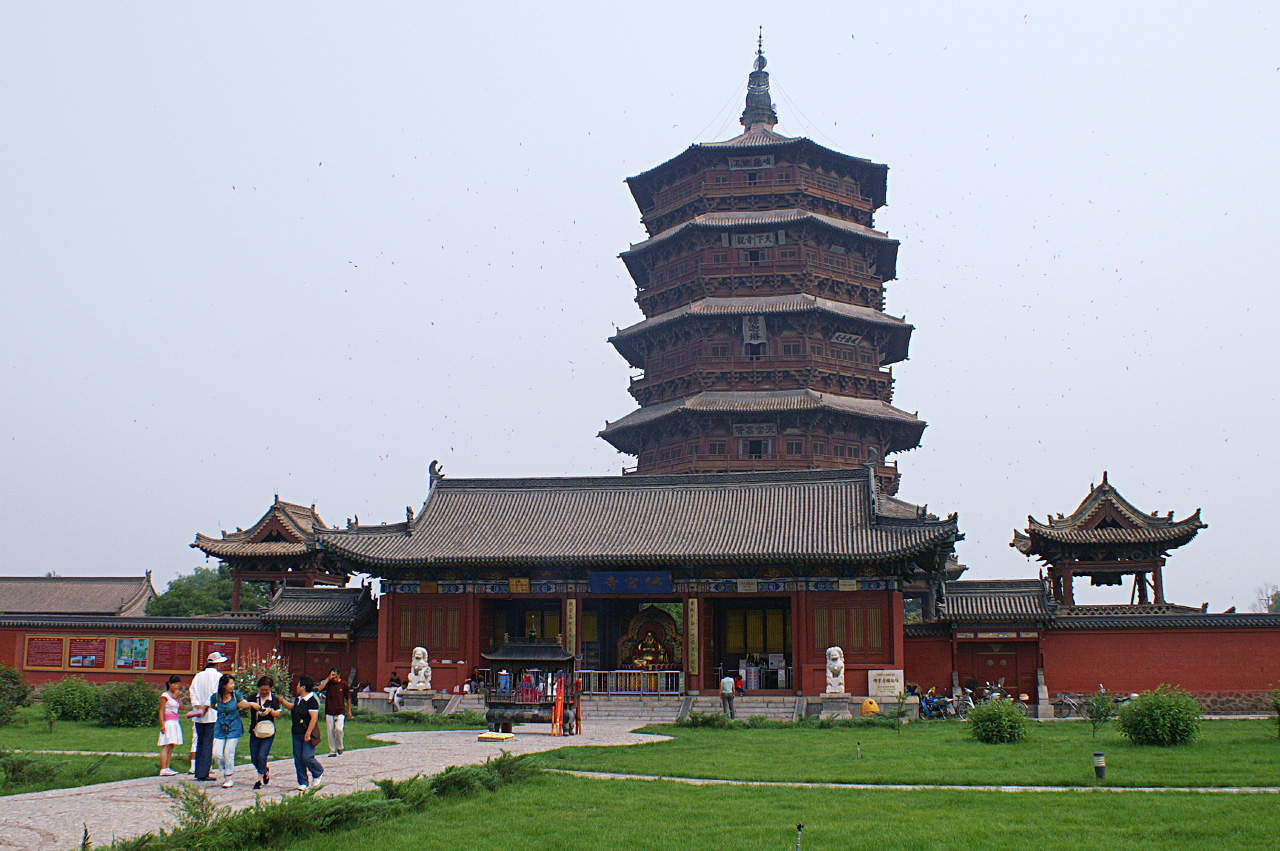
The pagoda and temple grounds

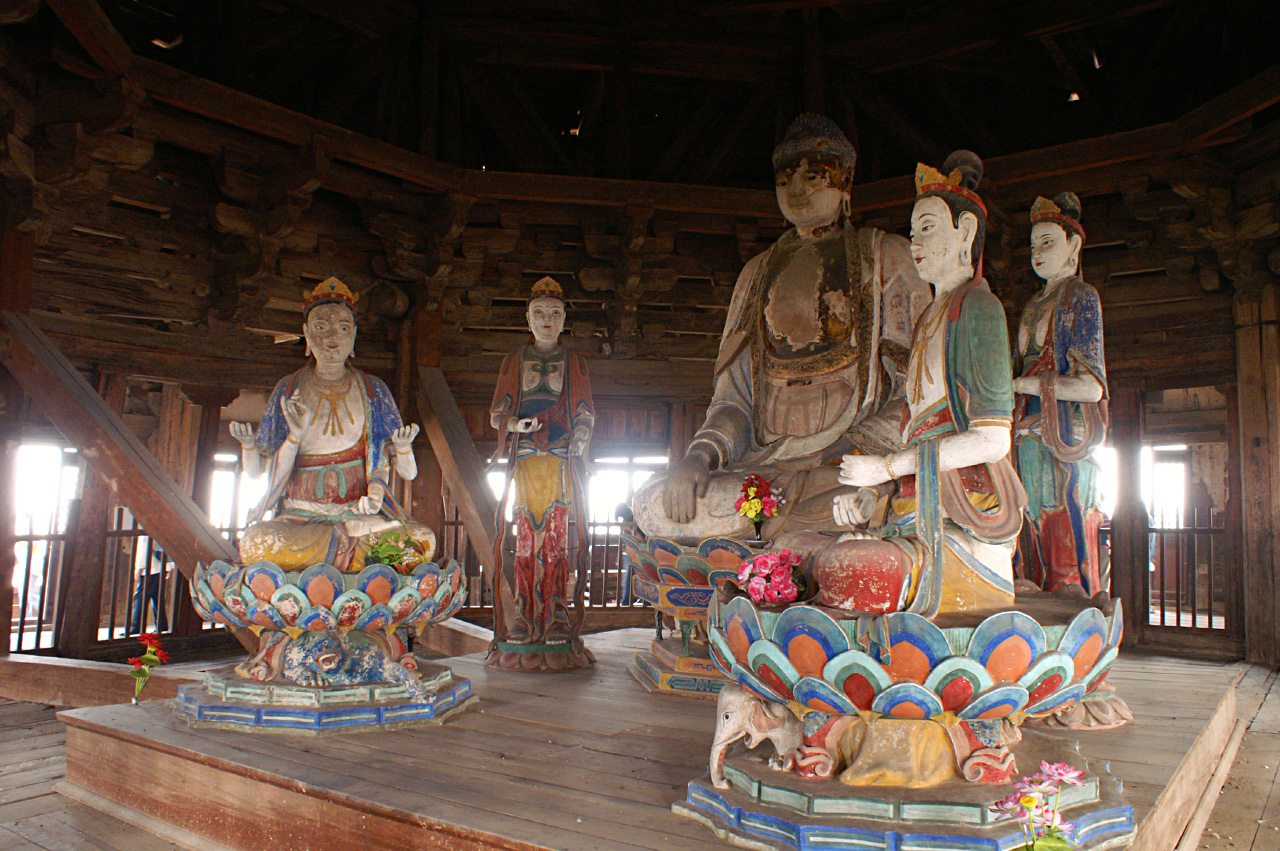
Buddhist statues found within the pagoda, with the Sakyamuni Buddha at the center

The Pagoda of Fogong Temple was built 85 km (53 mi) south of the Liao dynasty capital at Datong. The Complete Classics Collection of Ancient China encyclopedia published in 1725—written during the reigns of Kangxi and Yongzheng in the Qing—states that a different pagoda built between the years 936–943 stood previously at the site before the present one of 1056 was built. The same statement appears in the Shanxi tongzhi (Record of Shanxi Province) and the Yingzhou xuzhi (Record of Ying Prefecture, Continued). The Yingzhou zhi (Record of Ying Prefecture)—edited by Tian Hui during the reign of the Wanli Emperor (r. 1572–1620) of the Ming dynasty—states that the pagoda was funded and erected in 1056 by a Buddhist monk named Tian. In compiling a record for Ying County, Tian Hui of the late Ming dynasty researched the history of the pagoda and recorded the history of its repairs in his Zhongxiu Fogongsi ta zhi. The placard on the third story of the pagoda listed that periodic repairs were conducted in the years 1195 and 1471. While piecing together the history of the pagoda, Tian Hui never came across any information to suggest that the pagoda had a predecessor built from 936 to 943, as other texts suggest.

In confirming the date of 1056 and not the years 936–943, Zhang Yuhuan writes in his Zhongguo gudai jianzhu jishu shi (1985) that the Wenwu Laboratory determined various wooden components from the second to fifth floors of the pagoda to be 930 to 980 years old. Other evidence to suggest the later date includes the fact that the foster mother of Emperor Xingzong was a native of Yingzhou. Xingzong's son Hongji (Emperor Daozong) was also raised in Ying County due to his following of the Khitan custom of raising Yelu clan sons within the families of their mothers. Hongji was also known as a devout Buddhist; the pagoda (following the tradition of the stupa) symbolized the death of the Buddha, which Hongji might have associated with his deceased father, the Xingzong Emperor. The historian Nancy Steinhardt writes "only something like the memory of an imperial youth might account for the construction of such a phenomenal building in such an out-of-the way place." Also, the 1050s was a decade which marked the end of a Buddhist kalpa, which would signify the Pagoda of Fogong Temple as an "ultimate death shrine to the Buddha of the age," according to Steinhardt. This occurred at roughly the same time in which Fujiwara no Yorimichi of Japan converted the Phoenix Hall of his father Fujiwara no Michinaga's residence at Byōdō-in into a temple meant to guide souls into the Buddhist afterlife (according to Pure Land Buddhism).

The pagoda was placed at the center of the temple grounds, which used to be called Baogong Temple until its name was changed to Fogong in 1315 during the Yuan dynasty. Although the size of the temple grounds were described as being gigantic during the Jurchen-led Jin dynasty (1115–1234), the temple began to decline during the Ming dynasty.

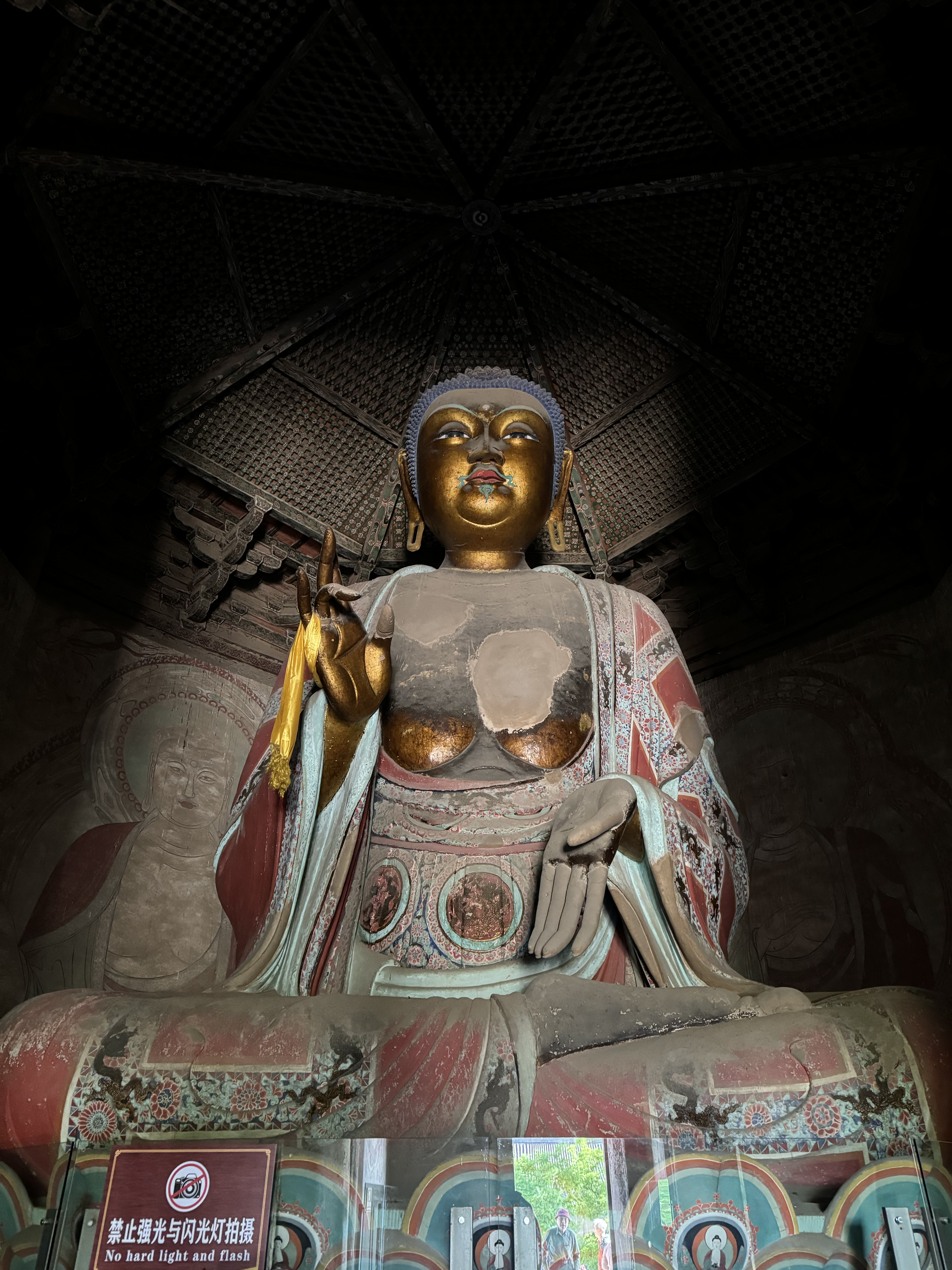
Gigantic Sakyamuni Buddha statue located on the first floor

The Yingzhou zhi records that there was a total of seven earthquakes between the years 1056 and 1103, yet the tower stood firm. In its entire history before the 20th century, the pagoda needed only ten minor repairs. However, considerable repairs were needed after Japanese soldiers shot more than two hundred rounds into the pagoda during the Second Sino-Japanese War. While repairing the pagoda in 1974, renovators found Liao dynasty texts of Buddhist sutras and other documents. This major discovery included the 12 scroll Liao Tripitaka (simplified Chinese: 辽藏; traditional Chinese: 遼藏) printed with movable type in 1003 in Yanjing (present-day Beijing), 35 scrolls of scriptures with block printed text the longest being 33.3 meters in length, and 8 handwritten scrolls. This attests to the widespread technological use of movable type printing that developed within the neighboring Song dynasty. Also, in 1974 a Buddha tooth relic was discovered hidden in one of the Buddha statues on the fourth level of the Pagoda.

== Features ==
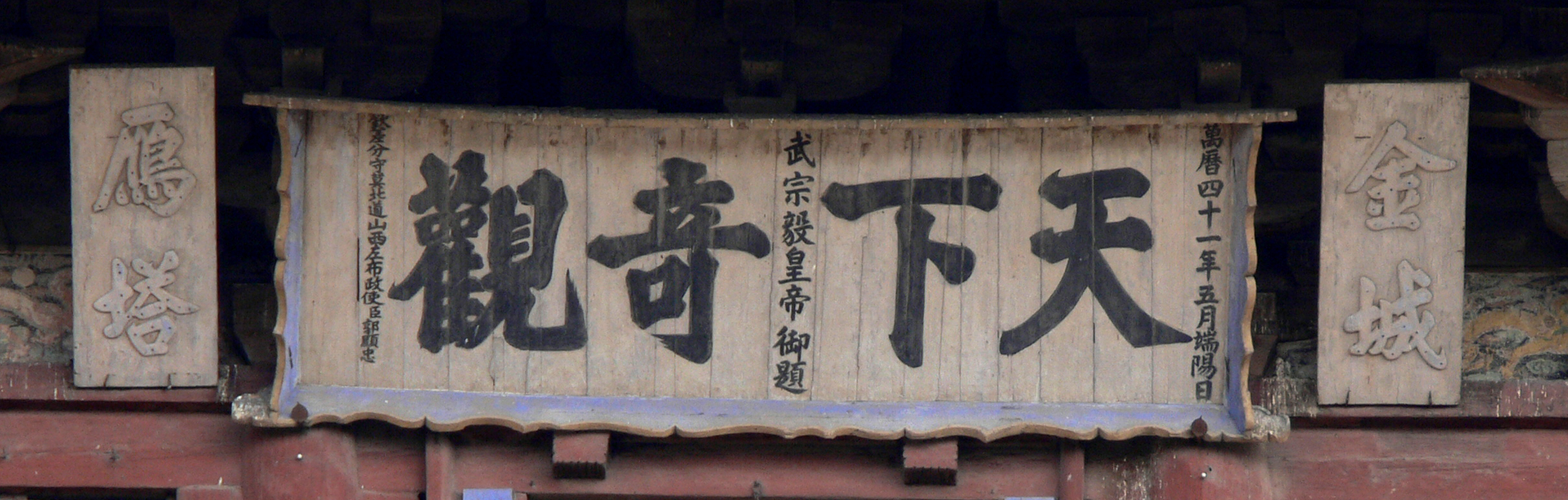
Zhengde Emperor calligraphy plaque "Wonder of the World" on Pagoda of Fogong Temple

The pagoda features fifty-four different kinds of bracket arms in its construction, the greatest amount for any Liao dynasty structure. Notably, the pagoda was constructed entirely without the use of nails or iron bars, relying solely on the complex interlocking of its wooden components. This architectural ingenuity has allowed the pagoda to endure the test of time and remain the oldest and tallest fully wooden pagoda in China and the world. Between each outer story of the pagoda is a mezzanine layer where the bracket arms are located on the exterior. Two pinnacle concepts to Chinese palatial architecture are exhibited in the monastery. The first, duodong, refers to the bearing blocks and bracket arms of the monastery. The second, diantang, refers to the Palatial Hall. From the exterior, the pagoda seems to have only five stories and two sets of rooftop eaves for the first story, yet the pagoda's interior reveals that it has nine stories in all. The four hidden stories can be indicated from the exterior by the pagoda's pingzuo (terrace balconies). A ring of columns support the lowest outstretching eaved roof on the base floor, while the pagoda also features interior support columns. A statue of the Buddha Sakyamuni sits prominently in the center of the first floor of the pagoda, with an ornate zaojing (caisson) above its head (the pagoda is named Sakyamuni Pagoda due to this statue). A zaojing is also carved into the ceiling of every story of the pagoda. The windows on the eight sides of the pagoda provide views of the countryside, including Mount Heng and the Sanggan River. On a clear day, the pagoda can be seen from a distance of 30 km (19 mi).

== Preservation ==
The Pagoda of Fogong Temple and its surroundings are protected by the SACH branch of the Chinese government, and over 1 million dollars have already been committed to the research on repairing and renovating the precariously standing millennium-old building. In May 2011, Shanxi provincial authorities stated that the application for the pagoda should be finished by July 2011 for it to be included on the UNESCO list of protected world heritage relics by 2013.

== The present ==
In 2013, the pagoda was placed on China's tentative list for UNESCO World Heritage Site consideration, along with the Fengguo Temple.

== See also ==
- Architecture of the Song dynasty
- List of tallest structures built before the 20th century
