= Pinglu Canal =

Canal in Guangxi, China

Coordinates: 22°27′9″N 108°56′24″E

- Interactive map of Pinglu Canal
- Location: Guangxi
- Country: China

Specifications
- Length: 134.2 km (83.4 miles)
- Maximum boat beam: 15.8 m (52 ft)
- Maximum boat draft: 5 m (16 ft)
- Locks: 3
- Maximum height AMSL: 65

History
- Construction began: August 2022
- Date completed: 16 September 2026

Geography
- Start point: Xijin reservoir, Hengzhou, Guangxi
- End point: Qinzhou (Gulf of Tonkin)

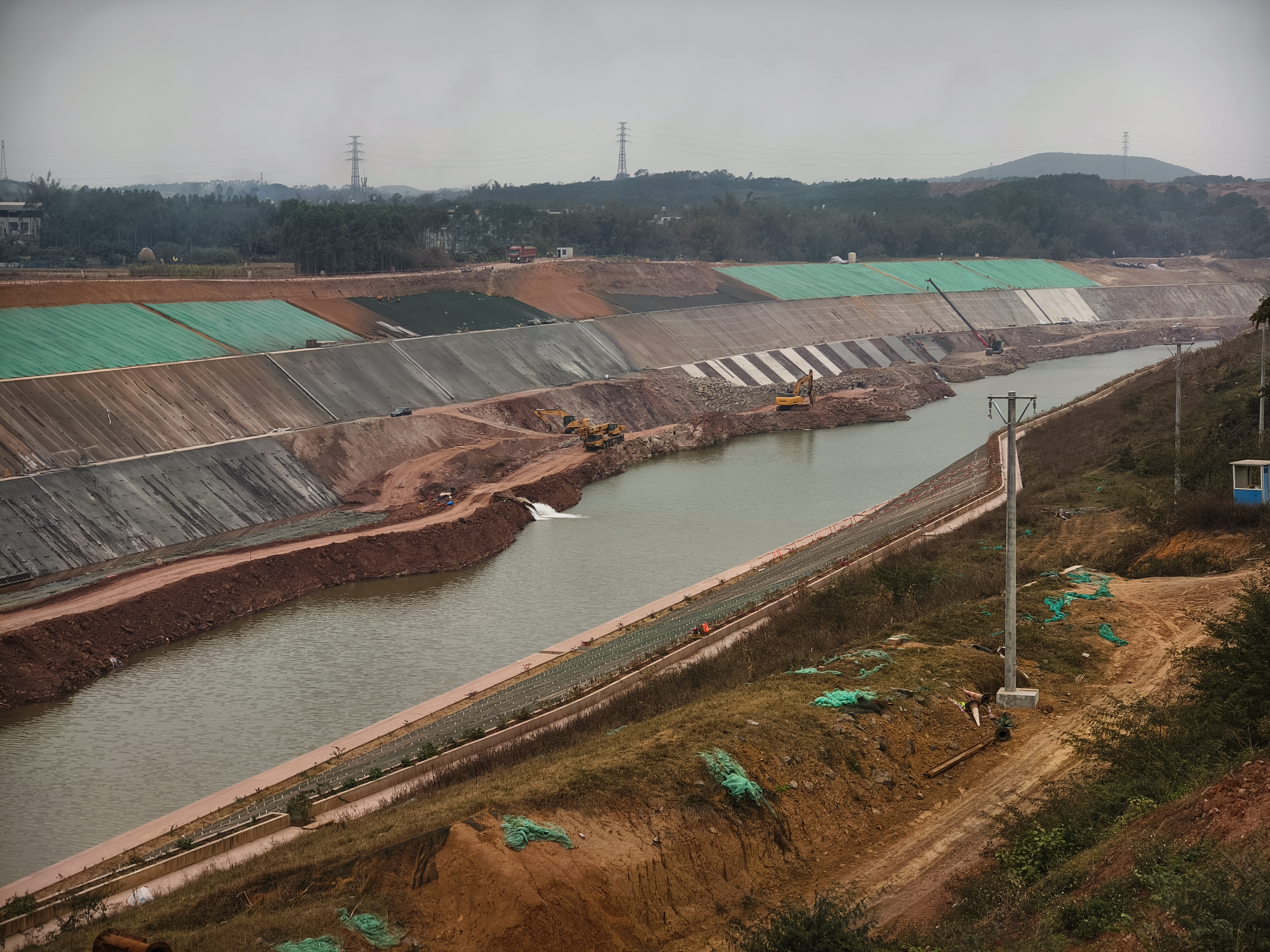
Pinglu Canal in construction, February 2026

The Pinglu Canal (simplified Chinese: 平陆运河; traditional Chinese: 平陸運河; pinyin: Píng-Lù Yùnhé; Jyutping: Peng4 luk6 wan6 ho4), also known as Pingtang–Luwu Canal, is a 134.2 km (83.4 mi) canal in Guangxi province, China between Xijin reservoir on the Yu river in Hengzhou and the lower part of the Qin River. Commissioned in September 2026, the canal is an I-class waterway that provides direct access to the Gulf of Tonkin from inland Guangxi, which previously had to rely on the Pearl River delta in the neighboring Guangdong province for maritime transport, and shortens the route to the sea by up to 560 km (350 mi). It is first river-to-sea canal constructed since the founding of the People's Republic of China.

== Description ==
Overall difference in elevation is 65 m (213 ft). The lock complexes at Madao, Qishi and Qingnian each have two locks that are 300 m (980 ft) and 34 m (112 ft) wide. Madao locks handle an elevation difference of 30 m (98 ft); they reduce water consumption 63% by partially discharging to local reservoirs.

The canal is designed for 5,000 t (4,900 long tons) ships of 90 m (300 ft) length, 15.8 m (52 ft) beam and 5 m (16 ft) draft.

== Construction ==
Construction started in August 2022.

339 million cubic meters of material was expected to be excavated and used to create or reclaim 835.7 hectares of land. The canal was opened on 16 September 2026, having cost CN¥72.7 billion/US$10.2 billion to construct.

== External references ==
- Zhang, Ke (12 June 2024). "China to Open Shortest Waterway From Guangxi to ASEAN in 2026". Yicai Global.
- He, Huifeng (24 July 2023). "Game changer or white elephant? China eyes Asean links with shipping canal". South China Morning Post.
- "China has plans for grand canals". The Economist. 15 September 2022. Archived from the original on 17 September 2022.
- Tan, CK (30 May 2023). "China's massive new canal aims for closer ASEAN connectivity". Nikkei Asia.
