= Lake Huangqi =

Lake in Inner Mongolia, China

Lake Huangqi 黄旗海
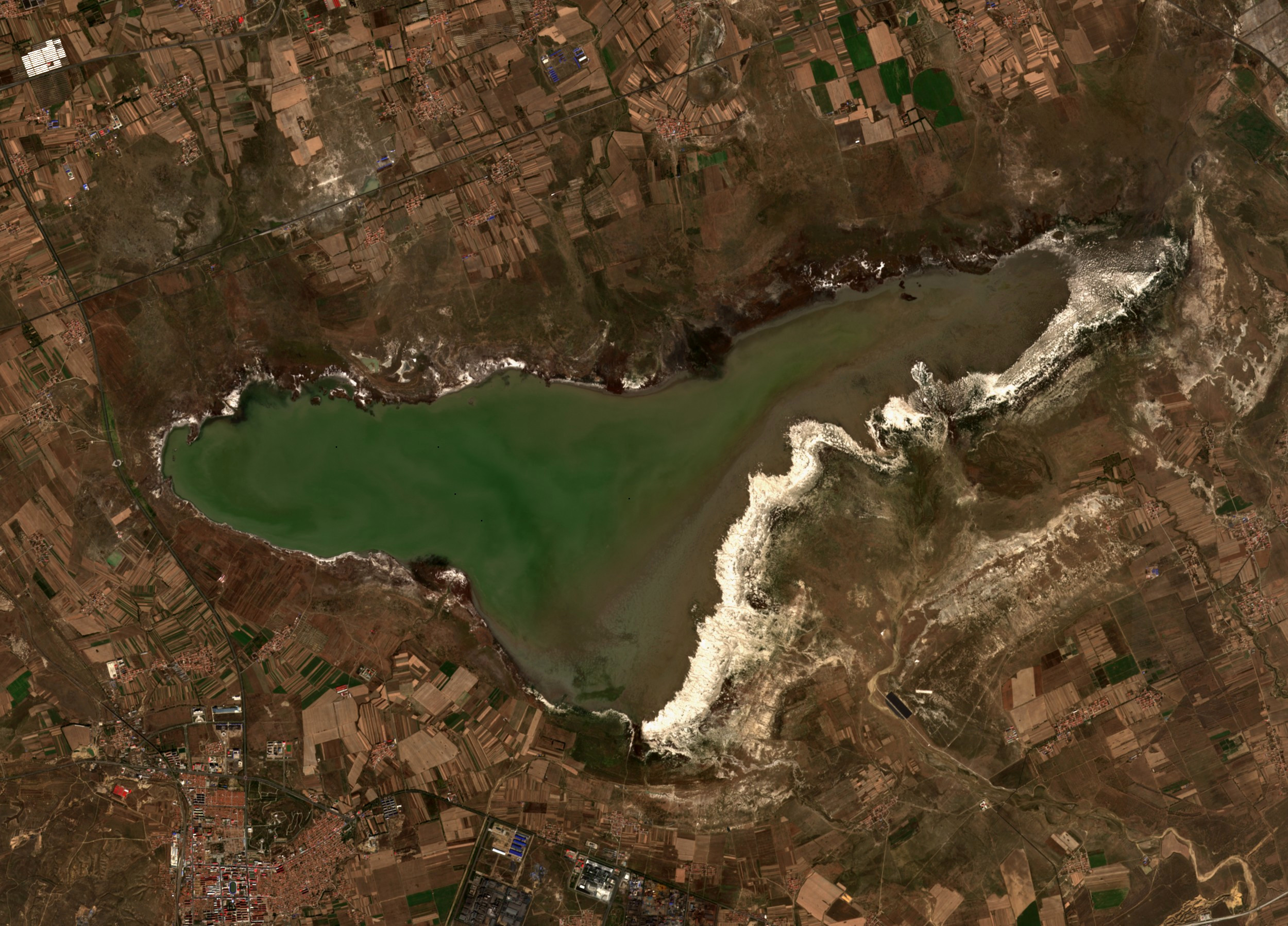

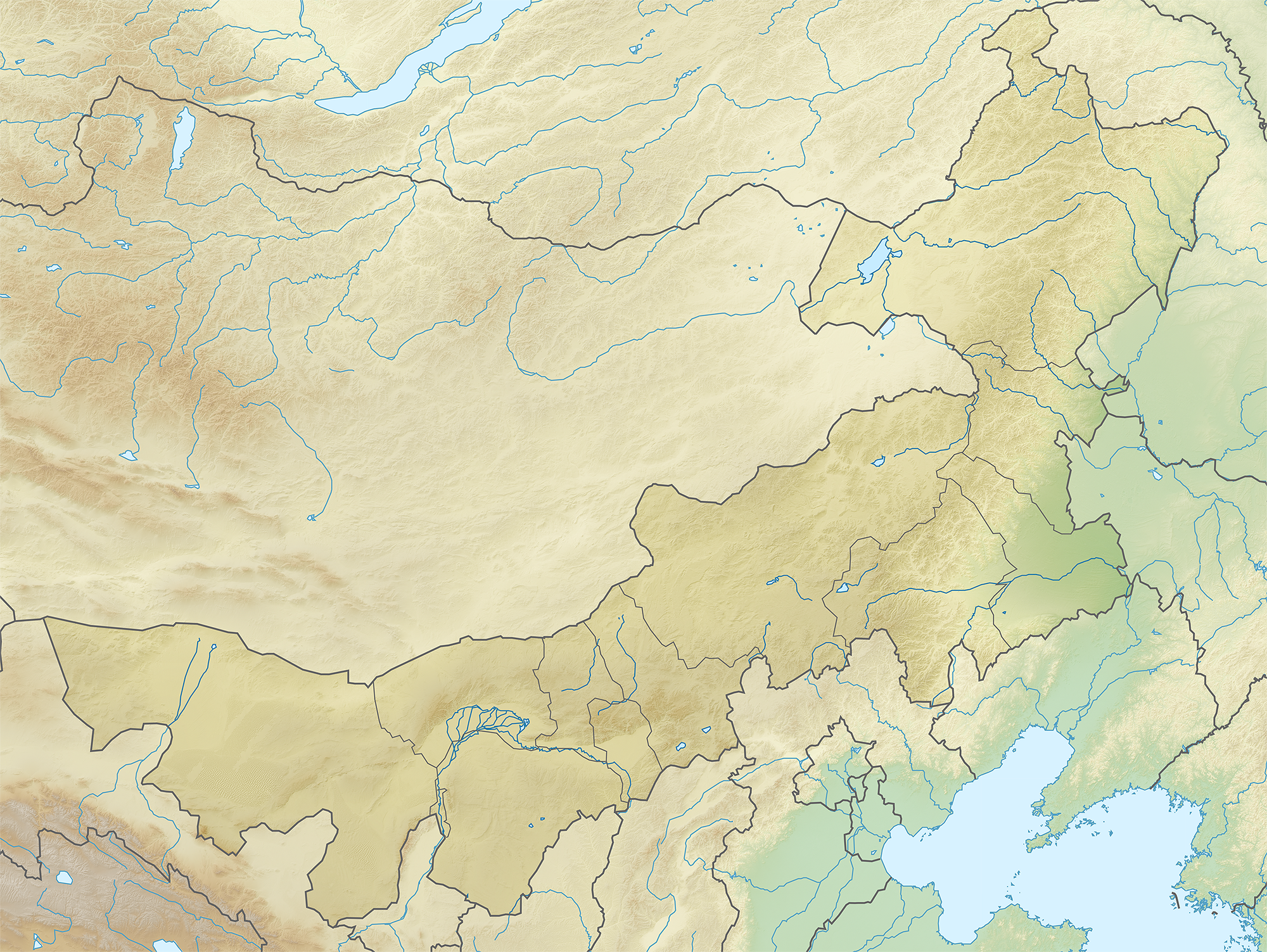
- Location within Inner Mongolia
- Location: Chahar Right Front Banner, Ulanqab Prefecture, Inner Mongolia, China
- Coordinates: 40°50′17″N 113°16′49″E
- Basin countries: China
- Max. length: 20 km (12 mi)
- Max. width: 9 km (6 mi)
- Surface area: 110–113 km^{2} (42–44 sq mi)
- Average depth: 4–10 m (13–33 ft)
- Max. depth: 35 m (115 ft)
- Water volume: 460–500 million cubic meters (370,000–410,000 acre⋅ft)

Lake Huangqi
- Traditional Chinese: 黃旗海
- Simplified Chinese: 黄旗海
- Literal meaning: Yellow Banner Sea
Transcriptions
Standard Mandarin
- Hanyu Pinyin: Huángqí Hǎi
- Wade–Giles: Huang-ch‘i Hai

Lake Huangqi, also known by its Chinese name as the Huangqi Hai, is a lake in Chahar Right Front Banner, Ulanqab Prefecture, Inner Mongolia, China. The lake has shrunk dramatically from its original size. Every year the lake loses more water to evaporation than is replenished by the now smaller rivers which feed it.

== Name ==
The present name dates to the Qing, when it was named after one of the Eight Banners.

== Geography ==
Lake Huangqi is a lake in Chahar Right Front Banner, Ulanqab Prefecture, Inner Mongolia, China. It forms an irregular inverted triangle of about 110–113 km^{2} (42–44 sq mi), with an east–west distance of about 20 kilometers (12 mi) and a north–south distance of about 9 kilometers (6 mi). Having an average depth of 4–10 meters (13–33 ft) and a maximal depth of 35 meters (115 ft), it holds 460–500 million cubic meters (370,000–410,000 acre⋅ft) of water.

== History ==
Under the Qin, Huangqi and Dai lakes formed the northern boundaries of Yanmen Commandery, marking part of the northern frontier of the Chinese empire.
