= Chinese Center for Disease Control and Prevention =

Chinese public health agency

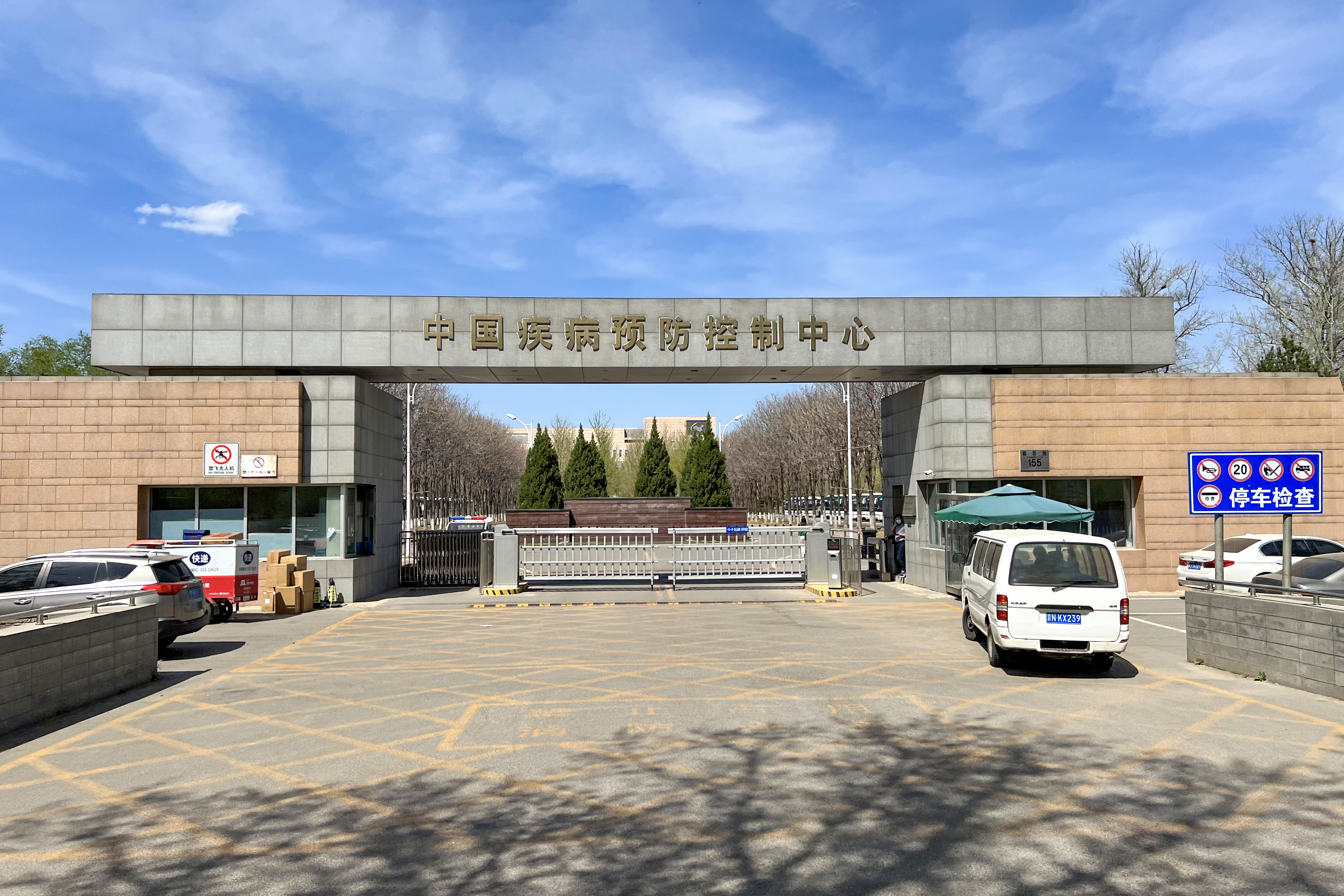

Agency overview
- Formed: 23 December 1983; 42 years ago
- Headquarters: 155 Changbai Road, Changping District, Beijing, China
- Employees: 2120 (2016)
- Agency executive: Shen Hongbing, Director
- Parent department: National Health Commission
- Website: en.chinacdc.cn

Chinese Center for Disease Control and Prevention
- Simplified Chinese: 中国疾病预防控制中心
- Traditional Chinese: 中國疾病預防控制中心
- Literal meaning: China Disease Prevention-Control Center
Transcriptions
Standard Mandarin
- Hanyu Pinyin: Zhōngguó Jíbìng Yùfáng Kòngzhì Zhōngxīn

The Chinese Center for Disease Control and Prevention (China CDC; Chinese: 中国疾病预防控制中心) is an institution directly under the National Health Commission, based in Changping, Beijing, China.

Established in 1983, it works to protect public health and safety by providing information to enhance health decisions, and to promote health through partnerships with provincial health departments and other organizations. The CCDC focuses national attention on developing and applying disease prevention and control (especially infectious diseases), environmental health, occupational safety and health, health promotion, prevention and education activities designed to improve the health of the people of the People's Republic of China.

== Operations ==
Shen Hongbing is the current director of the China CDC.

The CCDC administers a number of laboratories across China, including the biosafety level 2 facility at the Wuhan Center for Disease Control (sometimes confused with the nearby Wuhan Institute of Virology), which received global media coverage during the COVID-19 pandemic for its research into SARS-like coronaviruses of bat origin. On 10 January 2020, the CCDC uploaded the genetic sequence of SARS-CoV-2 to GISAID for global dissemination. In 2022, the Center shared with GISAID a phylogenetic analysis of over 32 independent introductions SARS-CoV-2 from outside China that were identified in the first quarter of the year.

The CCDC operates the Chinese Vaccinology Course in partnership with the University of Chinese Academy of Sciences and the Bill & Melinda Gates Foundation.

== Workforce ==
As of 2016, the Chinese CDC has 2120 staff with 1876 technical professionals (accounting for 89%), 133 managerial staff (accounting for 6%), and 111 logistic staff (accounting for 5%).

== Publications ==
The Chinese CDC publishes or co-sponsors a total of 16 journals, including China CDC Weekly, Journal of Hygiene Research, Chinese Journal of Experimental and Clinical Virology, and Chinese Journal of Epidemiology.

== See also ==
- List of national public health agencies
- Centers for Disease Control and Prevention, US equivalent
- Korea Centers for Disease Control and Prevention, South Korean equivalent
- Africa Centres for Disease Control and Prevention, African Union equivalent
- National Bureau of Disease Control and Prevention (established on 13 May 2021)
- World Health Organization
- Wuhan Institute of Virology
- Infectious Change, a 2016 ethnography about changes in the CDCC
