= Shuocheng District =

Shuocheng 朔城区
- District
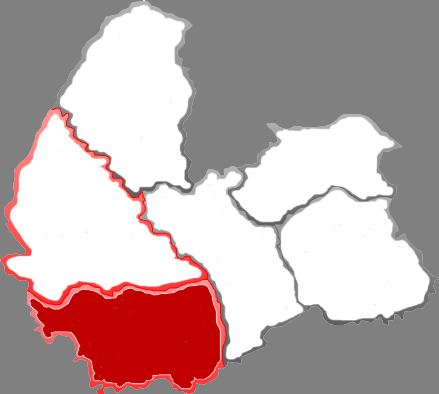
- Shuocheng in Shuozhou

- Location in Shanxi
- Coordinates (Shuocheng District government): 39°19′11″N 112°25′55″E
- Country: People's Republic of China
- Province: Shanxi
- Prefecture-level city: Shuozhou

Area
  - Total: 1,768 km^{2} (683 sq mi)

Population (2020)
  - Total: 565,075
  - Density: 319.6/km^{2} (827.8/sq mi)
- Time zone: UTC+8 (China Standard)

Shuocheng District
- Simplified Chinese: 朔城区
- Traditional Chinese: 朔城區
Transcriptions
Standard Mandarin
- Hanyu Pinyin: Shuòchéng Qū
Yue: Cantonese
- Jyutping: sok^{3}sing^{4} keoi^{1}

Former names

Mayi County
- Traditional Chinese: 馬邑縣
- Simplified Chinese: 马邑县
- Literal meaning: Horse Town County
Transcriptions
Standard Mandarin
- Hanyu Pinyin: Mǎyìxiàn
- Wade–Giles: Ma-i Hsien

Yinguan County
- Traditional Chinese: 陰館縣
- Simplified Chinese: 阴馆县
- Literal meaning: Shady Office(s) County; Yin Office(s) County
Transcriptions
Standard Mandarin
- Hanyu Pinyin: Yīnguǎnxiàn
- Wade–Giles: Yin-kuan Hsien

Yanmen Commandery
- Traditional Chinese: 雁門郡 鴈門郡
- Simplified Chinese: 雁门郡
- Literal meaning: Yanmen Pass Commandery
Transcriptions
Standard Mandarin
- Hanyu Pinyin: Yànménjùn
- Wade–Giles: Yen-mên Chün

Shuocheng District, formerly Shuo County, is the main urban district of the prefecture-level city of Shuozhou in Shanxi province, China.

== History ==
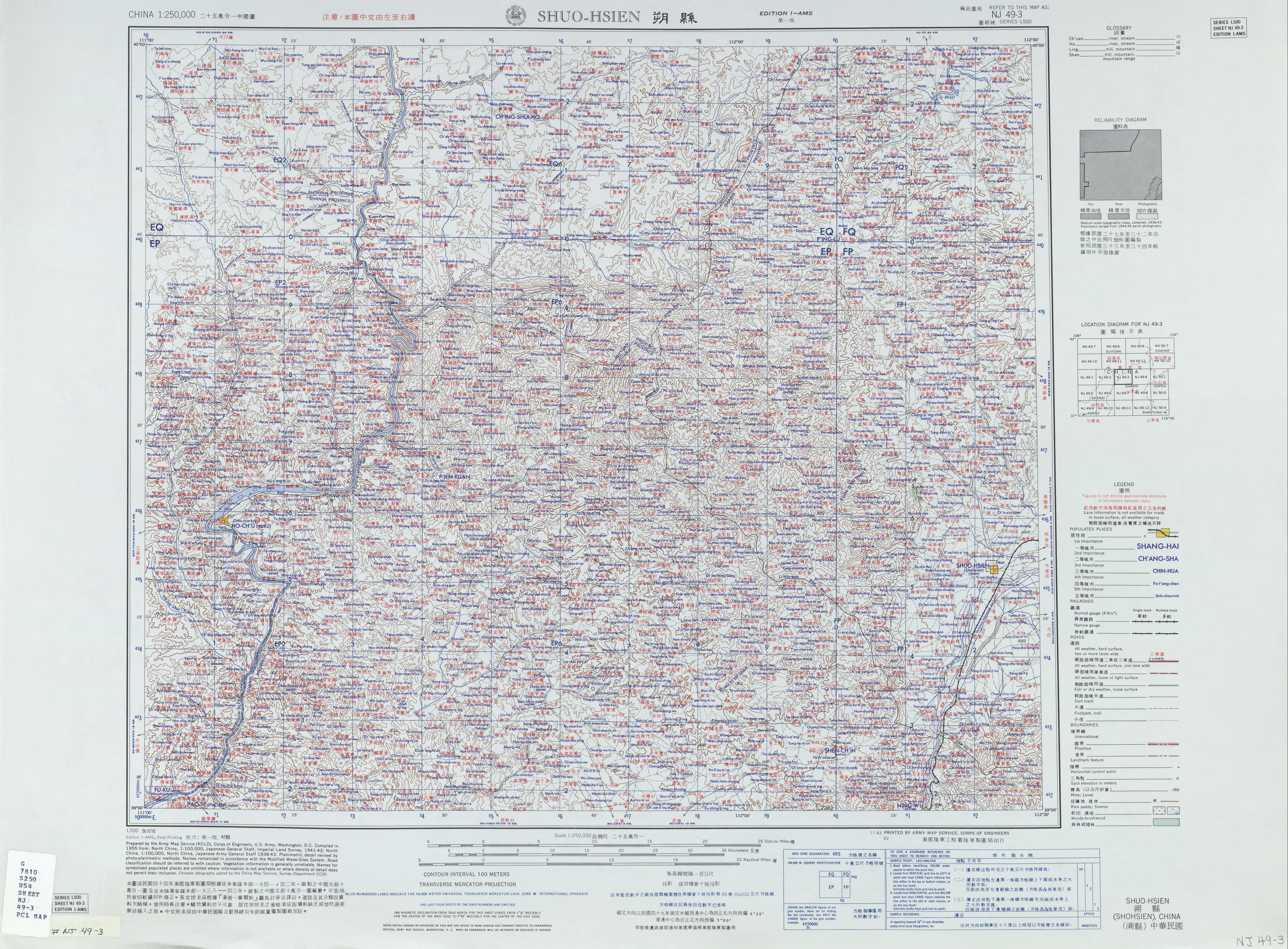
Map including Shuo County (labeled 朔縣 SHUO-HSIEN (Shohsien) (walled)) (AMS, 1955)

Shuocheng is the site of the ancient Chinese frontier post of Mayi and its territory was previously organized as the Mayi County of Yanmen Commandery. This is the birthplace of Zhang Liao.

Yinguan, in present-day Shuocheng District's Xiaguancheng Village (夏关城村; Xiàguānchéng Cūn), was the seat of another county and of all of Yanmen Commandery during the Eastern Han. The post was moved to Guangwu near present-day Daixian under the Kingdom of Wei.
