= Ying County =

Ying County 应县
- County
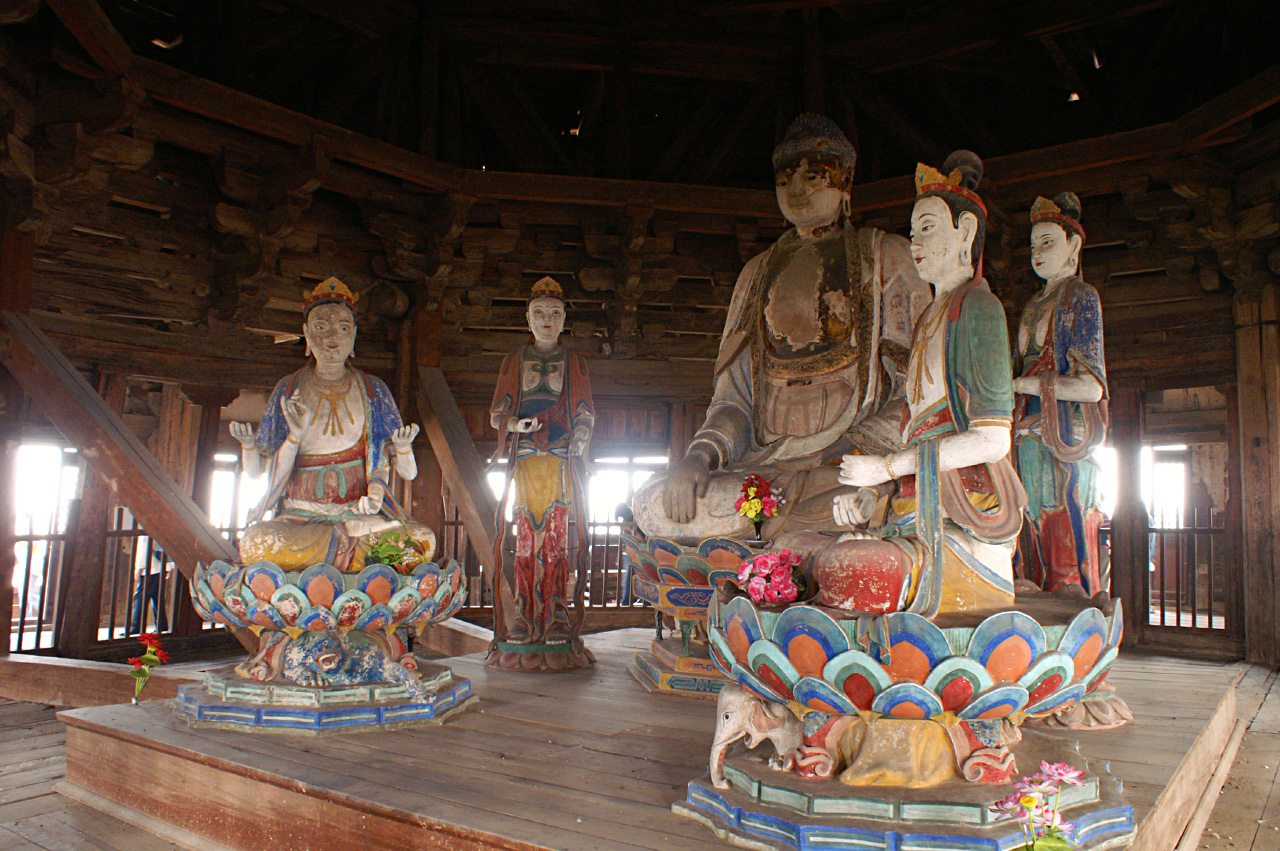
- Wooden Pagoda of Fogong Temple

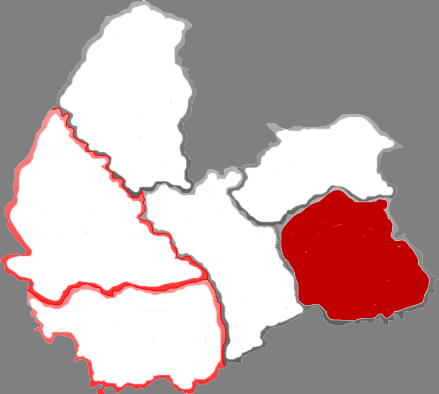
- Ying County in Shuozhou

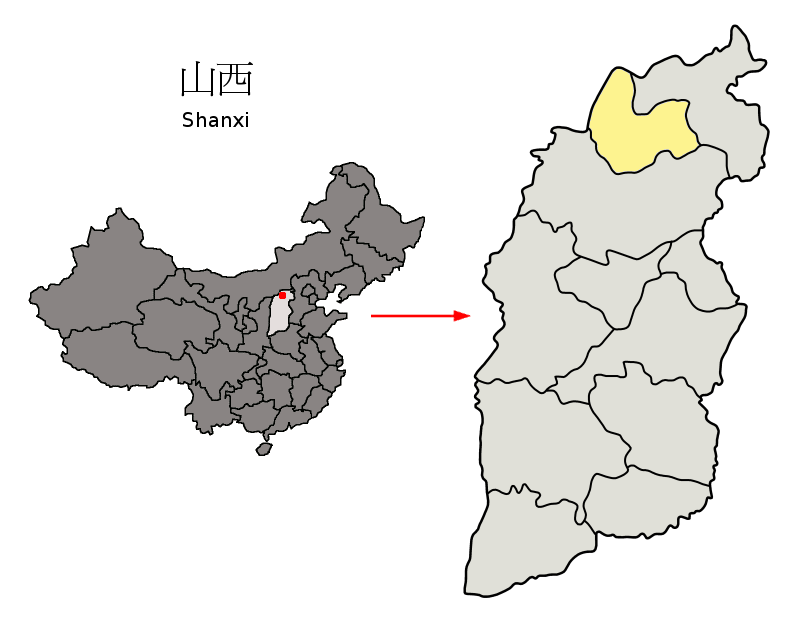
- Shuozhou in Shanxi
- Coordinates: 39°33′15″N 113°11′28″E
- Country: People's Republic of China
- Province: Shanxi
- Prefecture-level city: Shuozhou

Area
  - Total: 1,688 km^{2} (652 sq mi)

Population (2020)
  - Total: 243,970
  - Density: 144.5/km^{2} (374.3/sq mi)
- Time zone: UTC+8 (China Standard)

Ying County or Yingxian (simplified Chinese: 应县; traditional Chinese: 應縣; pinyin: Yìng Xiàn) is a county in the north of Shanxi province, China. It is the easternmost county-level division of the prefecture-level city of Shuozhou.

Ying County is best known for the Pagoda of Fogong Temple, which is built in 1056 and was the tallest timber building in the world built before the rise of modern timber skyscrapers in the 2010s.

== Climate ==
Climate data for Yingxian, elevation 1,001 m (3,284 ft), (1991–2020 normals, extremes 1981–2010)
Month	Jan	Feb	Mar	Apr	May	Jun	Jul	Aug	Sep	Oct	Nov	Dec	Year
Record high °C (°F)	11.6 (52.9)	20.1 (68.2)	26.7 (80.1)	36.1 (97.0)	35.8 (96.4)	40.4 (104.7)	39.2 (102.6)	35.6 (96.1)	35.4 (95.7)	29.0 (84.2)	22.4 (72.3)	16.1 (61.0)	40.4 (104.7)
Mean daily maximum °C (°F)	−1.6 (29.1)	3.3 (37.9)	10.3 (50.5)	18.3 (64.9)	24.4 (75.9)	28.5 (83.3)	29.5 (85.1)	27.8 (82.0)	23.1 (73.6)	16.2 (61.2)	7.4 (45.3)	0.0 (32.0)	15.6 (60.1)
Daily mean °C (°F)	−9.0 (15.8)	−4.2 (24.4)	2.9 (37.2)	10.9 (51.6)	17.4 (63.3)	21.7 (71.1)	23.4 (74.1)	21.5 (70.7)	16.2 (61.2)	9.1 (48.4)	0.6 (33.1)	−6.5 (20.3)	8.7 (47.6)
Mean daily minimum °C (°F)	−14.9 (5.2)	−10.4 (13.3)	−3.3 (26.1)	3.9 (39.0)	10.4 (50.7)	15.2 (59.4)	17.8 (64.0)	16.1 (61.0)	10.2 (50.4)	3.2 (37.8)	−4.7 (23.5)	−11.8 (10.8)	2.6 (36.8)
Record low °C (°F)	−27.9 (−18.2)	−26.7 (−16.1)	−20.7 (−5.3)	−10.2 (13.6)	−4.8 (23.4)	2.4 (36.3)	8.7 (47.7)	5.2 (41.4)	−2.1 (28.2)	−9.7 (14.5)	−24.0 (−11.2)	−29.8 (−21.6)	−29.8 (−21.6)
Average precipitation mm (inches)	1.8 (0.07)	2.9 (0.11)	8.3 (0.33)	19.1 (0.75)	36.3 (1.43)	53.7 (2.11)	86.6 (3.41)	72.7 (2.86)	56.2 (2.21)	24.4 (0.96)	8.7 (0.34)	1.5 (0.06)	372.2 (14.64)
Average precipitation days (≥ 0.1 mm)	1.9	2.5	3.5	4.7	7.7	10.4	12.0	10.0	9.3	6.0	3.4	1.6	73
Average snowy days	2.8	3.8	3.2	1.2	0.1	0	0	0	0	0.5	3.3	2.9	17.8
Average relative humidity (%)	53	47	42	39	40	50	63	66	62	55	53	52	52
Mean monthly sunshine hours	195.4	195.6	229.1	245.1	268.0	249.0	246.3	243.3	219.5	217.7	195.0	188.4	2,692.4
Percentage possible sunshine	65	64	62	61	60	56	55	58	60	64	66	65	61
Source: China Meteorological Administration
