= Pinglu District =

Coordinates: 39.5122°N 112.288°E

Pinglu 平鲁区
- District
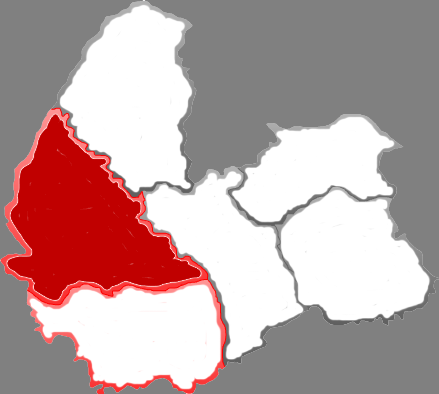
- Pinglu in Shuozhou

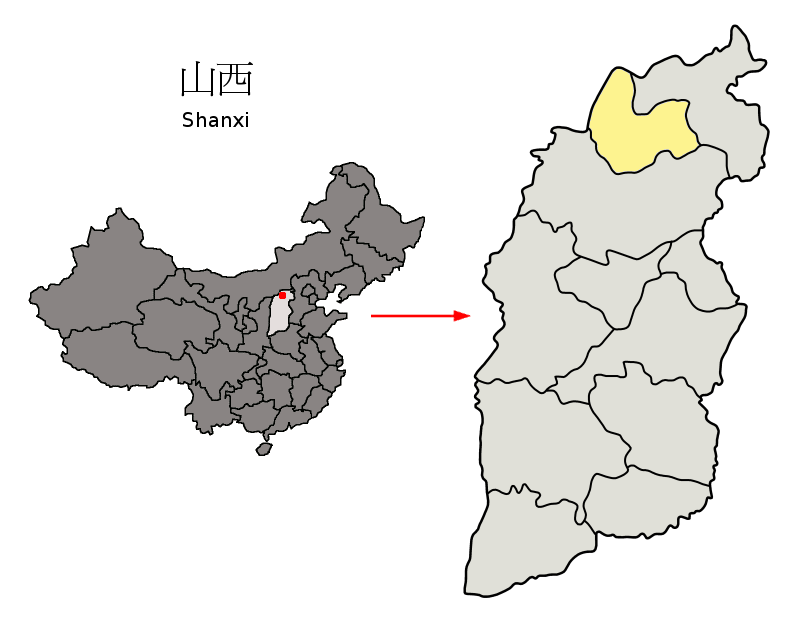
- Shuozhou in Shanxi
- Country: People's Republic of China
- Province: Shanxi
- Prefecture-level city: Shuozhou

Area
  - Total: 2,317 km^{2} (895 sq mi)

Population (2020)
  - Total: 148,212
  - Density: 63.97/km^{2} (165.7/sq mi)
- Time zone: UTC+8 (China Standard)

Pinglu District (simplified Chinese: 平鲁区; traditional Chinese: 平魯區; pinyin: Pínglǔ Qū) is a district of the city of Shuozhou, Shanxi province, China, bordering Inner Mongolia to the northwest.

== Climate ==
Climate data for Pinglu District, elevation 1,409 m (4,623 ft), (1991–2020 normals, extremes 1981–2010)
Month	Jan	Feb	Mar	Apr	May	Jun	Jul	Aug	Sep	Oct	Nov	Dec	Year
Record high °C (°F)	10.3 (50.5)	17.8 (64.0)	22.9 (73.2)	32.7 (90.9)	32.5 (90.5)	37.4 (99.3)	36.3 (97.3)	32.7 (90.9)	33.4 (92.1)	26.0 (78.8)	20.0 (68.0)	13.6 (56.5)	37.4 (99.3)
Mean daily maximum °C (°F)	−3.7 (25.3)	0.5 (32.9)	7.3 (45.1)	15.3 (59.5)	21.4 (70.5)	25.4 (77.7)	26.6 (79.9)	24.6 (76.3)	20.0 (68.0)	13.2 (55.8)	4.9 (40.8)	−2.2 (28.0)	12.8 (55.0)
Daily mean °C (°F)	−10.2 (13.6)	−6.3 (20.7)	0.5 (32.9)	8.3 (46.9)	14.8 (58.6)	19.1 (66.4)	20.8 (69.4)	18.9 (66.0)	13.7 (56.7)	6.8 (44.2)	−1.3 (29.7)	−8.3 (17.1)	6.4 (43.5)
Mean daily minimum °C (°F)	−15.3 (4.5)	−11.8 (10.8)	−5.4 (22.3)	1.8 (35.2)	7.9 (46.2)	12.7 (54.9)	15.3 (59.5)	13.6 (56.5)	8.3 (46.9)	1.5 (34.7)	−6.1 (21.0)	−12.9 (8.8)	0.8 (33.4)
Record low °C (°F)	−28.8 (−19.8)	−25.6 (−14.1)	−22.4 (−8.3)	−14.3 (6.3)	−5.2 (22.6)	0.9 (33.6)	8.2 (46.8)	3.7 (38.7)	−2.4 (27.7)	−12.7 (9.1)	−21.5 (−6.7)	−27.7 (−17.9)	−28.8 (−19.8)
Average precipitation mm (inches)	2.5 (0.10)	4.3 (0.17)	8.6 (0.34)	20.5 (0.81)	35.3 (1.39)	55.8 (2.20)	106.6 (4.20)	100.4 (3.95)	61.8 (2.43)	25.9 (1.02)	8.0 (0.31)	2.3 (0.09)	432 (17.01)
Average precipitation days (≥ 0.1 mm)	2.5	3.4	4.4	5.4	7.7	11.3	13.0	12.6	10.1	6.0	3.9	2.8	83.1
Average snowy days	4.7	5.3	5.1	2.1	0.2	0	0	0	0	1.3	4.5	4.7	27.9
Average relative humidity (%)	55	50	43	40	41	53	66	70	65	58	55	54	54
Mean monthly sunshine hours	195.9	196.0	240.2	258.5	281.7	252.1	241.2	234.7	218.4	223.7	201.4	188.6	2,732.4
Percentage possible sunshine	65	64	64	65	63	56	54	56	59	66	68	65	62
Source: China Meteorological Administration
