= Buziwan railway station =

Railway station in Datong, China

Coordinates: 40°20′21″N 113°16′30″E

General information
- Location: Xinrong District, Datong, Shanxi
- Transit authority: Hohhot Railway Bureau
- Line: Beijing–Baotou railway

History
- Opening: 1915
Location

Buziwan railway station (simplified Chinese: 堡子湾站; traditional Chinese: 堡子灣站; pinyin: Bǎozǐwān Zhàn) is a station on the Beijing–Baotou railway located in Xinrong District, Datong, Shanxi, with a postal code of 037035.

== History ==
Buziwan railway station was built in 1915 and is the earliest built station on the Beijing–Baotou railway. The station name was inscribed by China's first Minister of Railways, Guan Mianjun (關冕鈞).

In March 2009, the old station building of the Buziwan station was unexpectedly demolished by the Hohhot Railway Bureau. Local officials of the National Cultural Heritage Administration was completely unaware of the demolition of this historically valuable site beforehand.

== Station information ==
The station is 413 kilometers from Beijing Station and 419 kilometers from Baotou Station, under the jurisdiction of the Hohhot Railway Bureau. It is currently classified as a Level 4 station.

Passenger Services: Handles passenger boarding and alighting; luggage and parcel shipping.

Freight Services: Handles the arrival of goods; does not handle the arrival of hazardous goods.

== See also ==
- List of stations on Jingbao railway
