= Yungang District =

Yungang 云冈区
- District
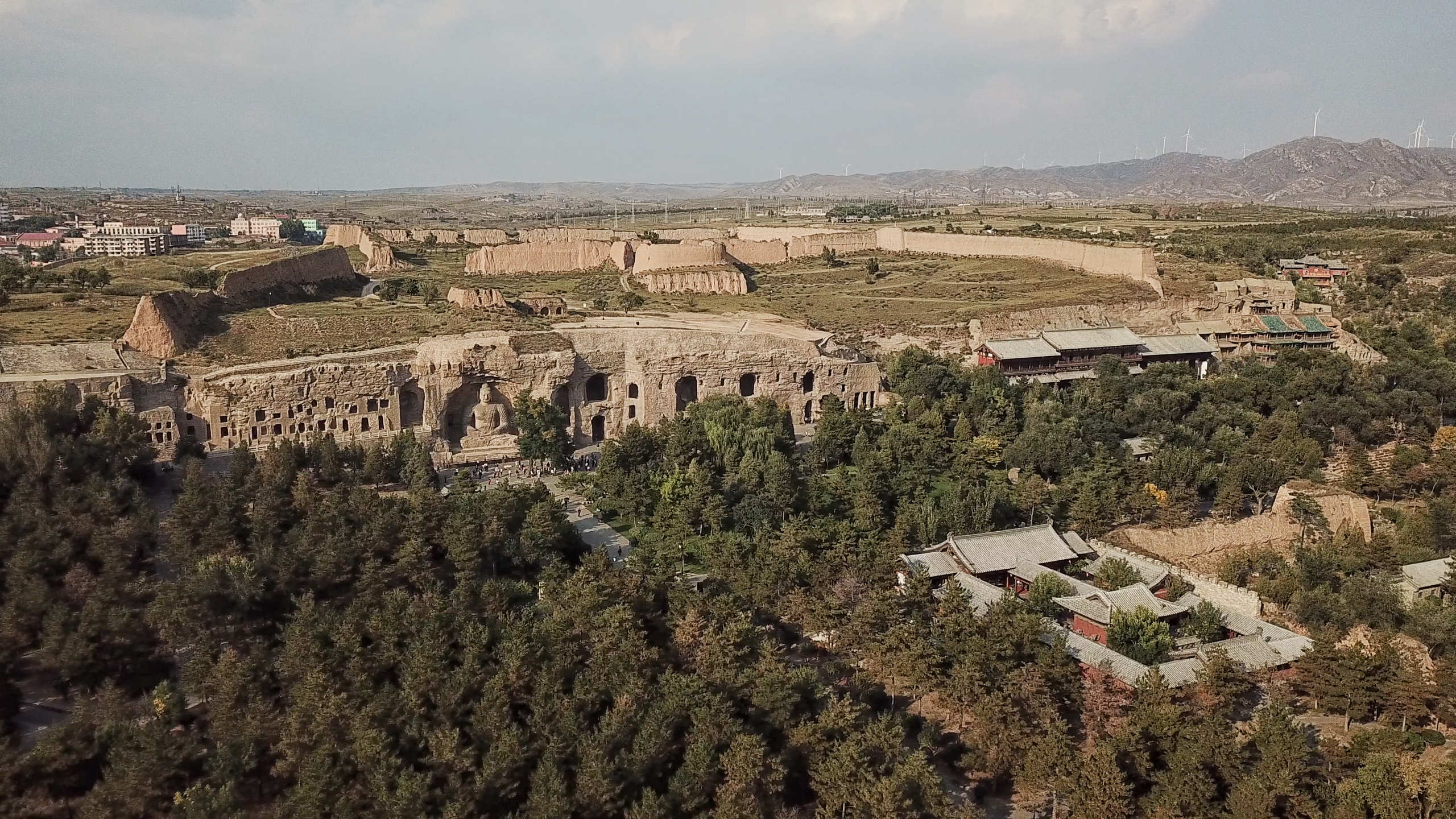

- Location in Shanxi
- Coordinates: 40°00′19″N 113°08′59″E
- Country: People's Republic of China
- Province: Shanxi
- Prefecture-level city: Datong

Area
  - Total: 742 km^{2} (286 sq mi)

Population (2020)
  - Total: 684,753
  - Density: 923/km^{2} (2,390/sq mi)
- Time zone: UTC+8 (China Standard)

Yungang District (simplified Chinese: 云冈区; traditional Chinese: 雲岡區; pinyin: Yúngāng Qū) formerly, Nanjiao District (南郊区) is a district of the city of Datong, Shanxi province, China. In February 2018, all of Mining District and parts of Cheng District merged with Nanjiao District to form the new Yungang District. Simultaneously, northern parts of Nanjiao District merged into Xinrong District.
