= Kuangqu =

Kuangqu (simplified Chinese: 矿区; traditional Chinese: 礦區; pinyin: Kuàngqū; lit. 'mining district'), or Kuang District may refer to:

- Kuangqu, Yangquan, Shanxi, China
- Bayan Obo Mining District, Inner Mongolia, China
- Fengfeng Mining District, Hebei, China
- Jingxing Mining District, Hebei, China
- Yingshouyingzi Mining District, Hebei, China

Defunct:

- Kuangqu, Datong, Shanxi, China (1970–2018)
- Kuangqu, Xuzhou, Jiangsu, China (1965–95)

== See also ==
- Mining town
