= Grand Mosque of Datong =

Mosque in Datong, Shanxi, China

Great Mosque of Datong 大同清真大寺
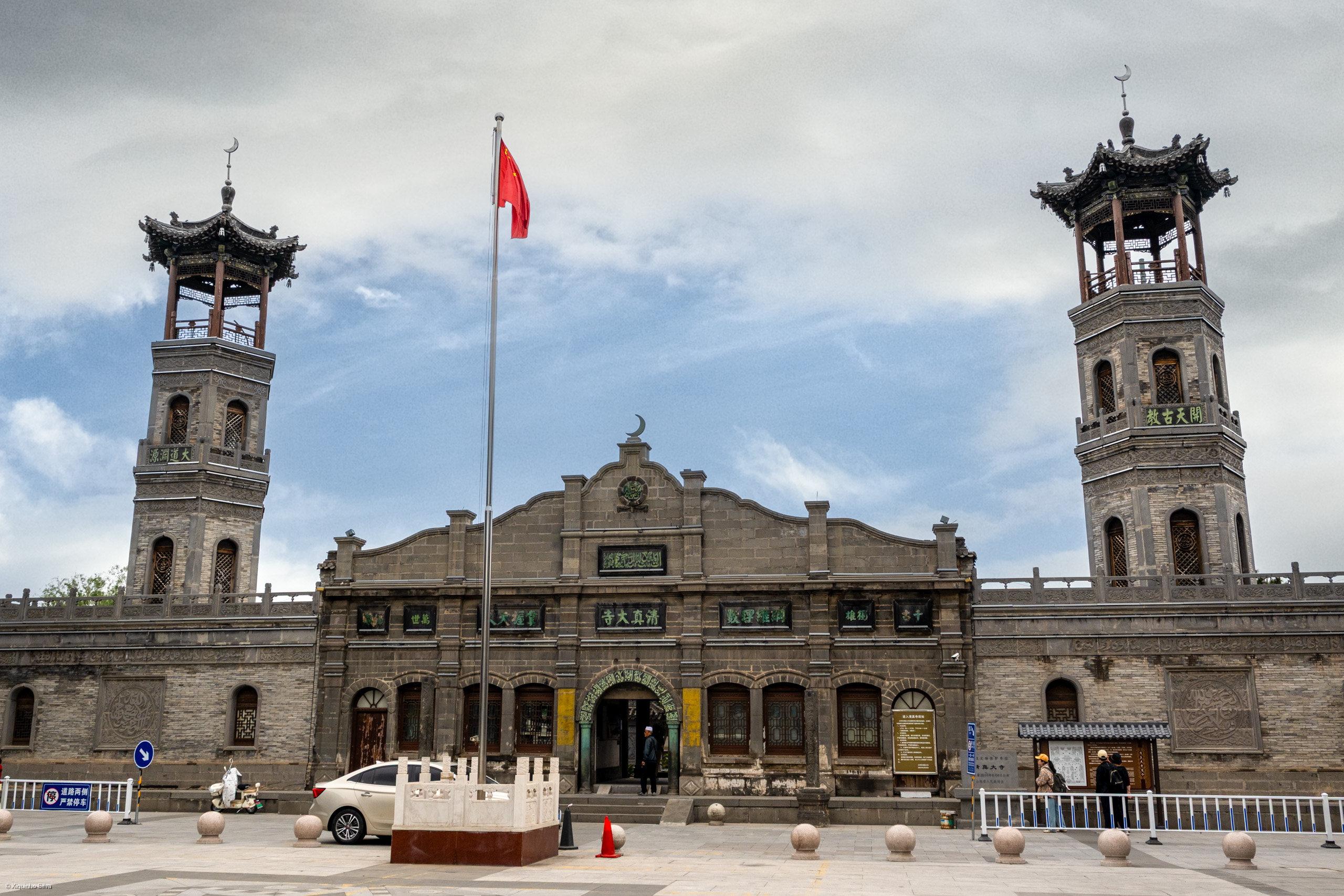

- Location within Shanxi

Religion
- Affiliation: Sunni Islam
- Province: Shanxi

Location
- Location: Jiulou Alley, Daxi Street, Pingcheng District, Datong,Shanxi, China
- Country: China
- Interactive map of Great Mosque of Datong 大同清真大寺
- Coordinates: 40.090°N 113.298°E

Architecture
- Established: 628

Grand Mosque of Datong is located at No. 19, Jiulou Lane, Qingyuan Street, Gucheng Subdistrict, Pingcheng District, Datong City, Shanxi Province.

== See also ==
- Islam in China
- List of mosques in China
