= Shuozhou Huairen Airport =

Shuozhou Huairen Airport 朔州怀仁机场
- IATA: none; ICAO: none

Summary
- Airport type: Military
- Location: Huairen, Shanxi, China
- Coordinates: 39°43′3″N 113°8′34″E

Map
- Location of airport in Shanxi

Shuozhou Huairen Airport or Huairen Air Base, located in Huairen, Shuozhou, is a People's Liberation Army Air Force (PLA-AF) installation near the Fen River, 43 km (27 mi) south of the city of Datong, in northern Shanxi province, China. It is located in the PLA Beijing Military Region. It formerly served as the main public airport for Datong until replaced by the newly built Datong Yungang Airport in 2006.

It is the headquarters of the PLA-AF 15th Fighter Division which operates Chengdu J-7 fighters and Nanchang Q-5 ground attack aircraft.

Satellite imagery of the site shows a single 10,500 foot runway oriented NE/SW and a full-length parallel taxiway connected to revetments at either end of the field.

== See also ==
- List of airports in China
- List of People's Liberation Army Air Force airbases
