= Jiuli =

Jiuli may refer to:

- Jiuli tribe, a legendary tribal group in ancient China
- Jiuli District, a former administrative division in Xuzhou, Jiangsu, China, was disestablished in 2010
- Guri, city in Gyeonggi Province, South Korea
- Jiuli Station, on Line 7 of the Dalian Metro
