= Datong County =

Datong County may refer to two counties of the People's Republic of China:

- Datong County, Shanxi (大同县), a former county reorganised as Yunzhou District in 2018
- Datong Hui and Tu Autonomous County (大通回族土族自治县), Qinghai
