= Datong Yungang International Airport =

Airport in Shanxi, China

Datong Yungang International Airport 大同云冈国际机场
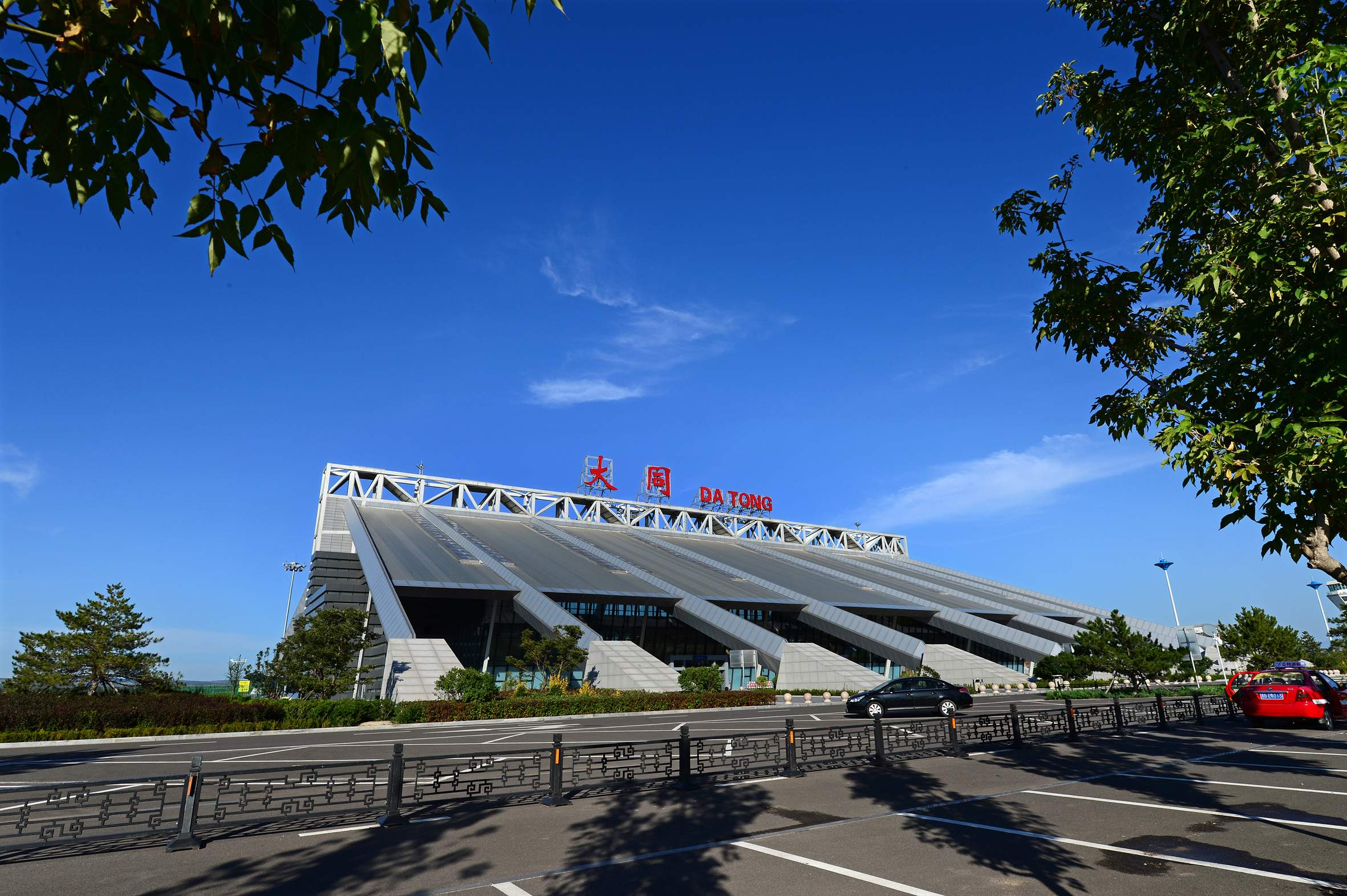
- IATA: DAT; ICAO: ZBDT

Summary
- Airport type: Public
- Operator: Shanxi Civil Airport Group
- Serves: Datong, Shanxi, China
- Location: Beijiazao, Yunzhou District
- Opened: January 2006; 20 years ago
- Elevation AMSL: 1,054 m (3,458 ft)
- Coordinates: 40°03′37″N 113°28′55″E
- Website: www.sxairport.org.cn

Map
- Location in Shanxi DAT/ZBDT (China)

Runways
Direction	Length		Surface
Direction	m	ft	Surface
14/32	3,000	9,843	Concrete

Statistics (2025)
- Passengers: 950,646
- Aircraft movements: 20,556
- Cargo (metric tons): 1,900.4
- Source: CAAC

Datong Yungang International Airport
- Simplified Chinese: 大同云冈国际机场
- Traditional Chinese: 大同雲岡國際機場
Transcriptions
Standard Mandarin
- Hanyu Pinyin: Dàtóng Yúngāng Guójì Jīchǎng

Datong Yungang International Airport (IATA: DAT, ICAO: ZBDT) is an airport serving the city of Datong in Shanxi Province, China. It is located north of Beijiazao town in Yunzhou District, 15.2 kilometers from the city center.

== History ==
Construction of Datong Airport began in 2001 with a total investment of 290 million yuan, and the airport was opened in January 2006. The airport's expansion was completed in 2013. The flight area of the airport is civil 4C. The runway is 3000 meters long and 45 meters wide. It can take off and land models below B737-800 (inclusive) and A321 (inclusive). There are two existing terminals, T1 International (6328.2 square meters) and T2 Domestic (10854 square meters), with a total area of 17182.2 square meters; apron area of 37,950 square meters, which can park 7 aircraft (6C, 1B) at the same time; parking The field area is 31255 square meters; it can meet the aviation demand of an annual passenger throughput of 900,000 passengers, a peak hour of 518 passengers, and a cargo and mail throughput of 4,700 tons. Originally called Datong Beijiazao Airport (大同倍加造机场), it was renamed to Yungang in August 2012, after the nearby Yungang Grottoes, a World Heritage Site and popular tourist attraction.

On July 31, 2013, the Datong Yungang Airport was temporarily opened to the outside world with the approval of the State Council. In 2019, Datong Airport operated 23 domestic routes and 2 international routes with 13 Chinese domestic airlines (Air China, United Airlines, Eastern Airlines, Guilin Airlines, Sichuan Airlines, China Southern Airlines, Lucky Air, Tianjin Airlines, Shandong Airlines, Shenzhen Airlines, Long Dragon Airlines, Kunming Airlines, and China Airlines). For domestic routes, there are 29 domestic cities including Beijing, Taiyuan, Tianjin, and Qinhuangdao in North China; Shanghai, Xiamen, Hangzhou, Nanjing, Hefei, Jinan, and Qingdao in East China; Harbin, Shenyang, Dalian in Northeast China; Wuhan, Guilin, Changsha, Guangzhou, and Guangzhou in Central South China. Shenzhen, Haikou, and Zhengzhou; Yinchuan, Xi'an, Lanzhou, Xining, Ürümqi in the northwest region; Chengdu, Kunming, and Chongqing in the southwest region. Two international routes go to Southeast Asian countries, Siem Reap, Cambodia, and Bangkok, Thailand.

On January 9, 2024, the General Office of the Civil Aviation Administration approved the renaming to "Datong Yungang International Airport" and the airport was formally opened to the outside world. On May 20, 2025, the first direct flight route between Datong and Hong Kong was officially opened, becoming the first official international route of Datong Yungang International Airport.

== Airlines and destinations ==
Airlines	Destinations
Aero K	Cheongju
China Eastern Airlines	Changchun, Guangzhou, Hefei, Kunming, Nanjing, Shanghai–Pudong, Wuhan
Donghai Airlines	Shenzhen, Zhengzhou, Zhuhai
Greater Bay Airlines	Hong Kong
Juneyao Air	Shanghai–Hongqiao
Ruili Airlines	Chengdu–Tianfu, Harbin
Thai Lion Air	Bangkok–Don Mueang

== See also ==
- Shuozhou Huairen Airport
- List of airports in China
- List of the busiest airports in China
