= Xinrong (disambiguation) =

Xinrong may refer to the following locations in China:

- Xinrong District (新荣区), Datong, Shanxi
  - Xinrong town (新荣镇), town in Xinrong District, Datong, Shanxi
- Xinrong town (新荣镇), town in Beiliu, Yulin, Guangxi
- Xinrong station, in Jiang'an District, Wuhan, Hubei
- Xinrong, Tibet, village
