= Datong Basin =

The Datong Basin (Chinese: 大同盆地) is located between the northern Shanxi Province and the inner/outer Great Walls, China. It occupies the western part of the Sanggan Basin, which has been created by the erosion of the Loess Plateau by the Sanggan River and its tributary, Yuhe.

The basin is at about 1,100 meters above sea level. It has thriving agriculture and animal husbandry, and is rich in mineral resources, such as coal.

== See also ==
- Datong's economy

== 外部リンク ==
- Drainage basins of China
