= Jumenbu =

Fortress of the Ming Great Wall

Coordinates: 40°19′58″N 112°59′37″E

Jumenbu (simplified Chinese: 拒门堡; traditional Chinese: 拒門堡; pinyin: jùménbǔ) is a fortress of the Ming Great Wall Shanxi Section, located in Datong city in Shanxi province, China.

Jumenbu is a fortress for guarding the Great Wall of China, and it is a part of the Great Wall defence system. Jumenbu is situated in a brae 2.5 km away from the Great Wall. It was designed to defend against invasion and harry the nomads of Mongolia. Its original name was Jumengbu, which literally means "Mongol-resistant stronghold", but it was later renamed.

The fortress is not big, and has only a gate on the east with a wengcheng (barbican entrance to the fortress) on the east. The wall was built from earth with bricks on the surface.
