= Guan Mianjun =

Republic of China person (1868–1933)

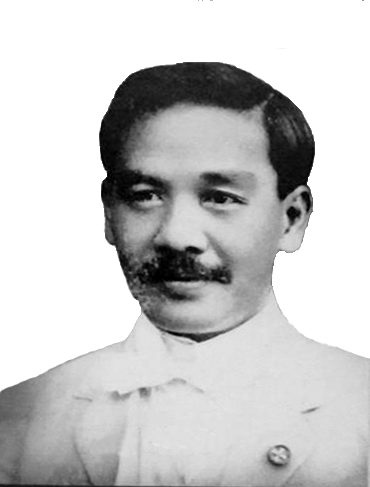
Guan Mianjun (1871－1933)

Guan Mianjun (1871–1933), was a politician from Changzhou Island in Cangwu, Guangxi during the Late Qing Dynasty and the Republic of China era.

== Life ==
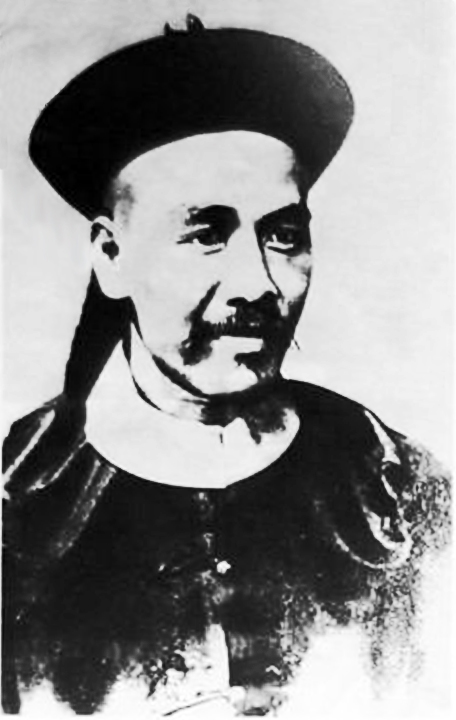
Guan Mianjun in Qing Dynasty official clothing

=== Late Qing Dynasty ===
Guan Mianjun became a Jinshi following a successful imperial examination in 1894. In May 1894, he was appointed scholar in the Hanlin Academy. In April 1895, after completing his studies, he was appointed editor in the Hanlin Academy and served as a supplementary councilor in the Ministry of Posts and Communications. He was also director of the Beijing-Zhangjiakou Railway and went on diplomatic missions to western countries.

=== Republic of China era ===
After the establishment of the Republic of China, Guan Mianjun served as the Minister of Railway and as a member of the Constitutional Conference. In 1917, he was appointed as the supervisor of the customs in Wuzhou. In 1919, he was appointed by President Xu Shichang to be a peace negotiator during the Constitutional Protection Movement, working along Liang Shiyi and Lin Shaofei to negotiate with warlords such as Lu Rongting in Guangxi. In 1926, he inscribed the name for Buziwan railway station, the earliest built station on the Beijing–Baotou railway.

In 1933, Guan Mianjun died due to sickness while in Beijing.
