= 15th Fighter Aviation Division =

Formation of the People's Liberation Army Air Force

The 15th Fighter Aviation Division is a formation of the Chinese People's Liberation Army Air Force.

The division headquarters was established from Headquarters 71st Division (Chinese: 第71师) (of the ground forces) in the last months of 1950 and the first months of 1951 (1949.2-1950.12).

The 71st Division had been established in February 1949 as part of the 24th Corps. It was based on the 17th Division, 6th Column of PLA Huadong Field Army. Its history can be traced to Wannan Contingent, 7th Division of New Fourth Army, formed in February 1943. As the 71st Division, it took part in several major battles in the last part of the Chinese Civil War.

In October 1950, the division was transferred to the Air Force. In December, the division was formally deactivated and reorganized as the 15th Aviation Division. When the division was dissolved, it was made up of the 211th, 212th, and 213th Infantry Regiments.

When the division became an aviation formation, it initially had under command the 43rd and 45th Regiments.

As of 2007, the division was headquartered at Huairen Air Base in the Beijing Military Region. It was equipped with J-7 fighters and Q-5 (ASCC "Fantan") ground attack aircraft. Chinese fighter aircraft divisions generally consisted, at the time, of about 17,000 personnel and 70-120 aircraft.

In April 2005, the 149th Regiment got subordinated to 15th Division as the 45th Regiment. The 149th Regiment had originated with the 50th Aviation Division, been moved to 8th Bomber Division, then became subordinated to the 10th Air Army in May 1986.

In 2007, the division included the 43rd Regiment, the 44th Regiment, and the 45th Regiment.

As of late September 2022, Scramble.nl listed only the 45th Air Regiment of the 15th Fighter/Ground Attack Division (第15歼击机/强击机 师) at Xinzhou/Wutaishan under the Central Theater Command Air Force, without a listed aircraft type. It writes that by 2017, the remaining Q-5s had been withdrawn from use.
