= Kuangqu, Datong =

Former district of Datong, Shanxi, China

Kuang District 矿区
- District of the People's Republic of China
- 1970–2018
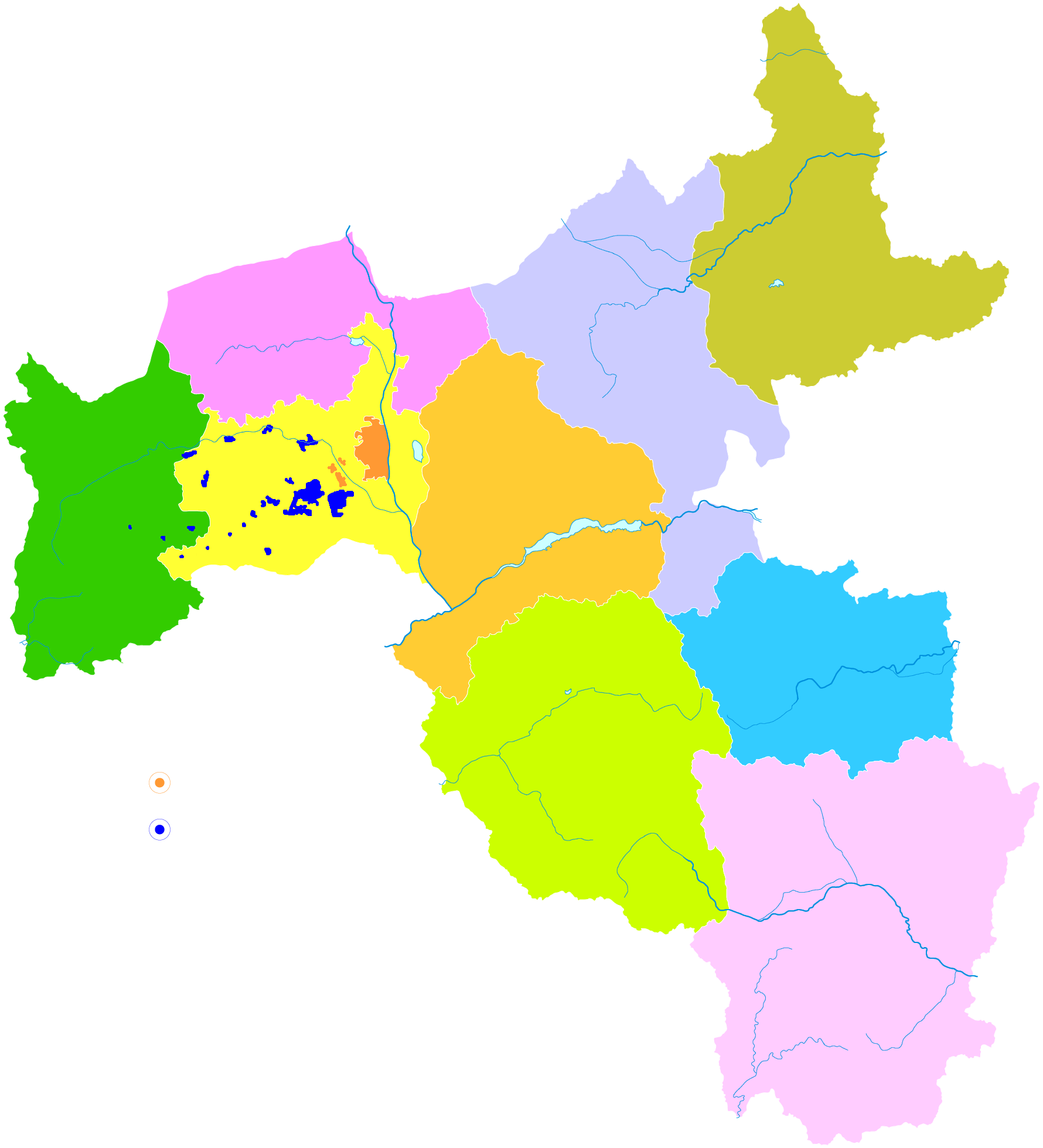
- Location of Kuang (Blue dots) on Datong.
- History
  - Established: 1970
  - Disestablished: 2018
Succeeded by
Yungang District
- Today part of: Part of Yungang District, Datong

Kuangqu (simplified Chinese: 矿区; traditional Chinese: 礦區; pinyin: Kuàngqū; lit. 'mining district') is a now defunct former district of Datong, Shanxi province, China. As of 2002, it had a population of 430,000 residing in an area of 62 km^{2} (24 sq mi). The district was made up of 28 subdistricts.
