= Jiuli District =

Former district of Xuzhou, China

Jiuli 九里区
- District of Xuzhou, China
- 1965–2010
- History
  - Established: 1965
  - Disestablished: 2010
Succeeded by
Gulou District, Xuzhou
Quanshan District
Tongshan District
- Today part of: Part of the Gulou District, the Quanshan District, the Tongshan District

Jiuli District (simplified Chinese: 九里区; traditional Chinese: 九里區; pinyin: Jiǔlǐ Qū; lit. 'nine li') was a suburban subdivision of Xuzhou, Jiangsu province, China. The district was named after a mountain lying within it.

In 1965, the district was established and designated "Mining District" for administering numerous coal and iron ore mines. It was renamed Jiuli in 1995, and its southeastern part, western part and the rest were merged into Gulou, Quanshan, Tongshan respectively in 2010.
