= Pingcheng District =

District in Datong, Shanxi, China

Pingcheng 平城区
- District
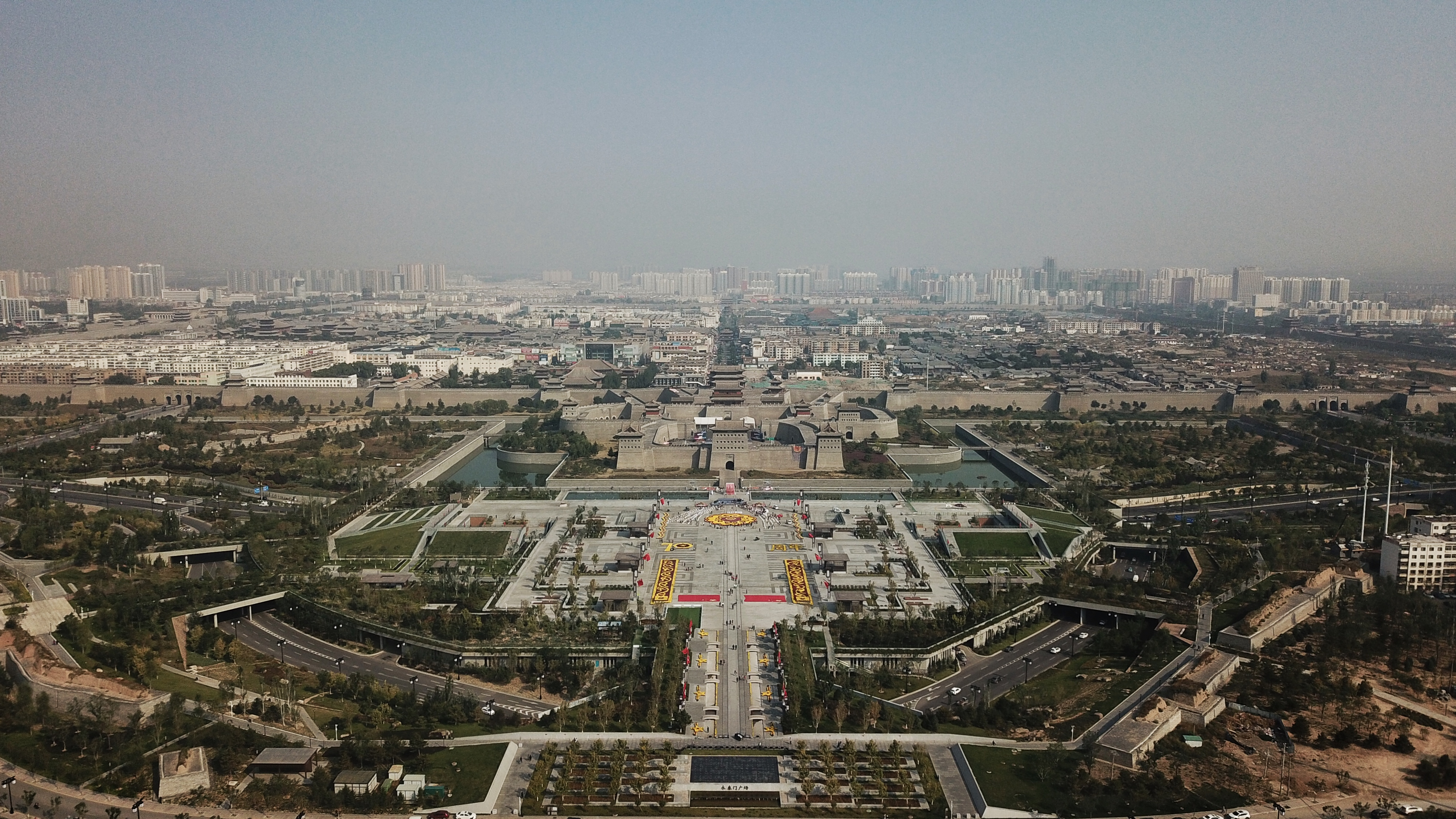
- The skyline of Datong

- Location in Shanxi
- Coordinates (Pingcheng District government): 40°04′32″N 113°17′53″E
- Country: People's Republic of China
- Province: Shanxi
- Prefecture-level city: Datong

Area
  - Total: 46.129 km^{2} (17.811 sq mi)

Population (2020)
  - Total: 1,105,699
  - Density: 23,970/km^{2} (62,081/sq mi)
- Time zone: UTC+8 (China Standard)
- Website: dtcqzf.gov.cn

Pingcheng District (simplified Chinese: 平城区; traditional Chinese: 平城區; pinyin: Píngchéng Qū), formerly known as Chengqu (城区; 城區; Chéngqū) or Cheng District is a district of Datong, Shanxi, China. As of 2002, it had a population of 560,000 living in an area of 46.129 km^{2} (17.811 sq mi).

Most of the urbanized area of Datong is in this district. In 2020 the district had 807,000 people.
