= Yunzhou District =

Yunzhou 云州区
- District
- Location in Shanxi
- Coordinates: 40°2′18″N 113°36′17″E
- Country: People's Republic of China
- Province: Shanxi
- Prefecture-level city: Datong
- Time zone: UTC+8 (China Standard)

Yunzhou District (simplified Chinese: 云州区; traditional Chinese: 雲州區; pinyin: Yúnzhōu Qū) is a district of the city of Datong, Shanxi. It was formerly known as Datong County (大同县; 大同縣; Dàtóng Xiàn) until 9 February 2018 in a State Council-approved reshuffle of Datong's administrative divisions.

== Climate ==
Climate data for Yunzhou District, elevation 1,034 m (3,392 ft), (1991−2020 normals, extremes 1991–present)
| Month | Jan | Feb | Mar | Apr | May | Jun | Jul | Aug | Sep | Oct | Nov | Dec | Year |
|---|---|---|---|---|---|---|---|---|---|---|---|---|---|
| Record high °C (°F) | 11.1 (52.0) | 20.1 (68.2) | 24.6 (76.3) | 35.7 (96.3) | 36.2 (97.2) | 39.1 (102.4) | 39.9 (103.8) | 36.6 (97.9) | 35.2 (95.4) | 28.1 (82.6) | 21.3 (70.3) | 14.5 (58.1) | 39.9 (103.8) |
| Mean daily maximum °C (°F) | −2.7 (27.1) | 2.3 (36.1) | 9.4 (48.9) | 17.7 (63.9) | 24.0 (75.2) | 27.9 (82.2) | 29.2 (84.6) | 27.6 (81.7) | 22.7 (72.9) | 15.5 (59.9) | 6.4 (43.5) | −1.1 (30.0) | 14.9 (58.8) |
| Daily mean °C (°F) | −11.7 (10.9) | −6.6 (20.1) | 1.1 (34.0) | 9.7 (49.5) | 16.5 (61.7) | 20.9 (69.6) | 22.8 (73.0) | 20.9 (69.6) | 15.1 (59.2) | 7.4 (45.3) | −1.7 (28.9) | −9.3 (15.3) | 7.1 (44.8) |
| Mean daily minimum °C (°F) | −18.6 (−1.5) | −13.7 (7.3) | −6.5 (20.3) | 1.1 (34.0) | 8.0 (46.4) | 13.5 (56.3) | 16.4 (61.5) | 14.5 (58.1) | 8.2 (46.8) | 0.8 (33.4) | −7.9 (17.8) | −15.6 (3.9) | 0.0 (32.0) |
| Record low °C (°F) | −31.9 (−25.4) | −28.7 (−19.7) | −26.0 (−14.8) | −12.6 (9.3) | −7.8 (18.0) | 3.4 (38.1) | 8.8 (47.8) | 3.7 (38.7) | −3.1 (26.4) | −12.1 (10.2) | −25.4 (−13.7) | −31.4 (−24.5) | −31.9 (−25.4) |
| Average precipitation mm (inches) | 2.1 (0.08) | 3.8 (0.15) | 9.1 (0.36) | 18.6 (0.73) | 34.3 (1.35) | 55.3 (2.18) | 101.6 (4.00) | 72.8 (2.87) | 55.4 (2.18) | 23.9 (0.94) | 8.5 (0.33) | 2.1 (0.08) | 387.5 (15.25) |
| Average precipitation days (≥ 0.1 mm) | 2.2 | 2.7 | 3.7 | 4.7 | 8.2 | 11.5 | 12.8 | 11.0 | 9.3 | 6.2 | 3.3 | 1.7 | 77.3 |
| Average snowy days | 3.1 | 4.1 | 3.8 | 1.6 | 0.1 | 0 | 0 | 0 | 0 | 0.6 | 3.5 | 3.4 | 20.2 |
| Average relative humidity (%) | 55 | 48 | 42 | 39 | 40 | 51 | 63 | 67 | 64 | 59 | 57 | 55 | 53 |
| Mean monthly sunshine hours | 204.4 | 207.0 | 250.1 | 264.6 | 289.0 | 268.7 | 264.5 | 259.0 | 234.3 | 232.6 | 197.0 | 191.0 | 2,862.2 |
| Percentage possible sunshine | 68 | 68 | 67 | 66 | 65 | 60 | 59 | 62 | 64 | 68 | 67 | 66 | 65 |
Source: China Meteorological Administrationall-time February high
