= Xinrong District =

Xinrong 新荣区
- District
- Location in Shanxi
- Coordinates: 40°15′27″N 113°08′21″E
- Country: People's Republic of China
- Province: Shanxi
- Prefecture-level city: Datong

Area
  - Total: 1,104 km^{2} (426 sq mi)

Population (2020)
  - Total: 88,664
  - Density: 80.31/km^{2} (208.0/sq mi)
- Time zone: UTC+8 (China Standard)

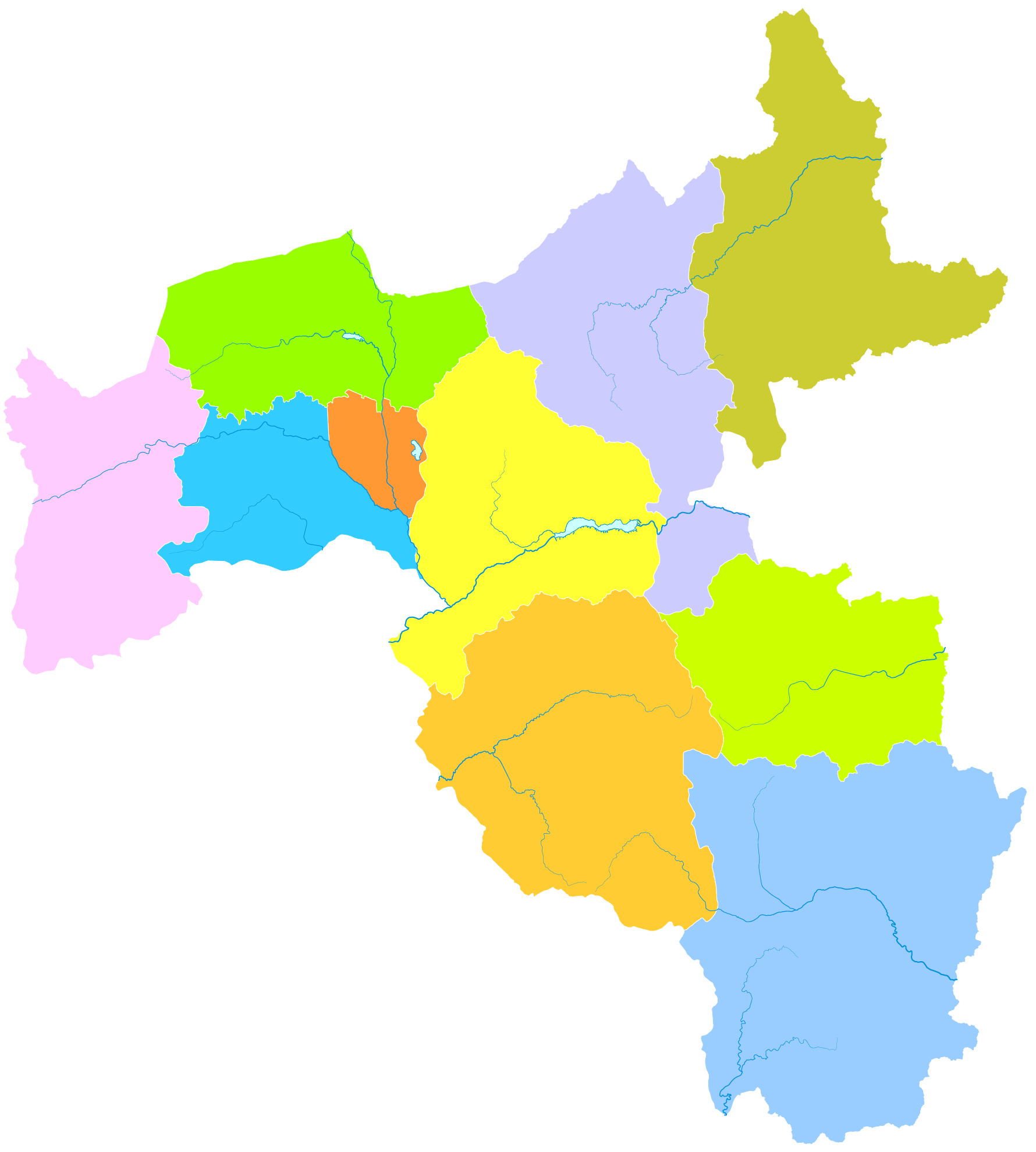
Administrative divisions of Datong City, Shanxi, China.

Xinrong District (simplified Chinese: 新荣区; traditional Chinese: 新榮區; pinyin: Xīnróng Qū) is a district of the city of Datong, Shanxi, People's Republic of China.
