= Hanging Temple =

Temple built into a cliff in Shanxi province, China

- 悬空寺
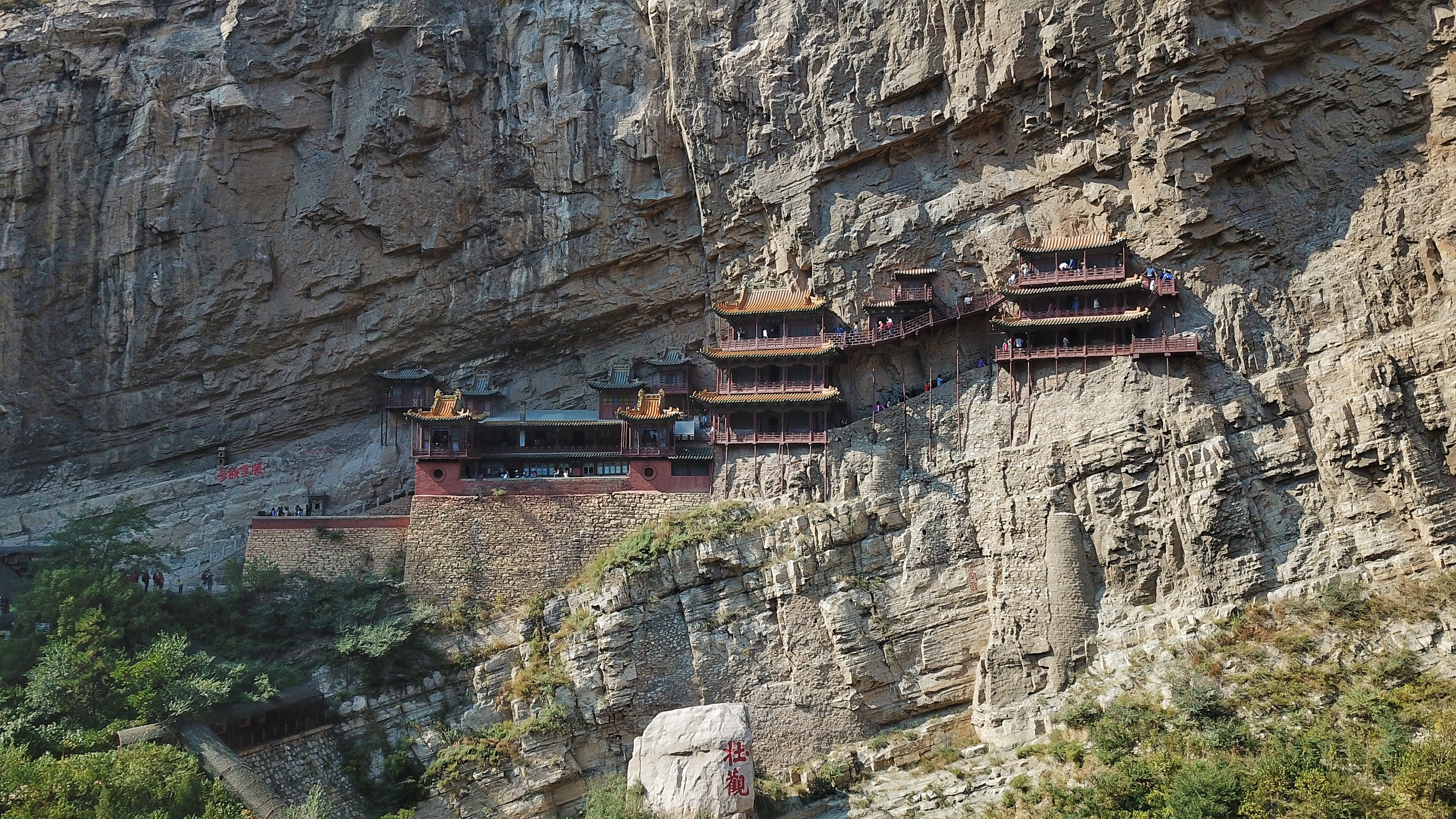
- The Hanging Temple

- Location within Shanxi Location within China

Religion
- Affiliation: Buddhism

Location
- Location: Hunyuan County, Datong City, Shanxi Province
- Country: China
- Coordinates: 39°39′57″N 113°42′18″E

Architecture
- Style: Chinese architecture
- Founder: Liaoran
- Established: 6th century

Hanging Temple
- Traditional Chinese: 懸空寺
- Simplified Chinese: 悬空寺
- Literal meaning: "The Suspended-in-Air Temple"
Transcriptions
Standard Mandarin
- Hanyu Pinyin: Xuánkōng Sì
- Wade–Giles: Hsüan^{2}-k'ung^{1} Ssŭ^{4}
- IPA: [ɕɥɛ̌n.kʰʊ́ŋ sɹ̩̂]
Yue: Cantonese
- Yale Romanization: Yùhnhūng jih
- Jyutping: Jyun4-hung1 zi6

The Hanging Temple, also Hengshan Hanging Temple, Hanging Monastery or Xuankong Temple (simplified Chinese: 悬空寺; traditional Chinese: 懸空寺; pinyin: Xuánkōng Sì) is a temple built into a cliff (75 m or 246 ft above the ground) near Mount Heng in Hunyuan County, Datong City, Shanxi Province, China. The closest city is Datong, 64 kilometres (40 mi) to the northwest. Along with the Yungang Grottoes, the Hanging Temple is one of the main tourist attractions and historical sites in the Datong area. Built more than 1,500 years ago, this temple is notable not only for its location on a sheer precipice but also because as a Buddhist temple it also contains references to the other two of the three Chinese traditional philosophies or religions (三教): Taoism, and Confucianism. The structure is kept in place with oak crossbeams fitted into holes chiseled into the cliffs. The main supportive structure is hidden inside the bedrock. The monastery is located in the small canyon basin, and the body of the building hangs from the middle of the cliff under the prominent summit, protecting the temple from rain erosion and sunlight bake.

== History ==
According to legend, construction of the temple was started at the end of the Northern Wei dynasty by only one man, a monk named Liaoran (了然), in 491 AD. Hanging Temple, located in Hunyuan County, Datong City, Shanxi Province, China, is a temple integrating Confucianism, Buddhism, and Taoism. It has a history of more than 1,400 years. The entire temple was built into a cliff face on the west side of Jinxia Gorge, approximately 75 meters (246 feet) above the ground. It relies on 27 wooden beams to support all the main temple buildings. The temple is also reinforced with iron chains and beams to enhance its stability. From a distance, it looks like it is hanging in the air.

As early as Tuoba Tao, the third emperor of the Northern Wei Dynasty, he proposed to build temples in the north. Emperor Taiwu once "abolished Buddhism" and "destroyed Buddhism", but later repented and "promoted Buddhism" and "promoted Taoism". During the Southern and Northern Dynasties, Chinese Taoism was divided into northern and southern Taoist temples. Emperor Xiaowen Tuoba Yuanhong saw the majesty of the Buddhist temples in Luoyang and wanted to build Buddhist and Taoist temples in the north. He came up with a unique idea, found a Taoist priest, and ordered to build a "Xuankong Temple" on the cliff halfway up Mount Hengshan, which could not reach the sky or the ground.

== Conservation ==
Due to its precarious location and exposure to the elements, the Hanging Temple requires regular maintenance and conservation efforts to ensure its structural integrity and preservation. In September 2015, the China Cultural Heritage Administration officially approved the project for the restoration of paintings and oil decorations in the Hanging Temple, and the overhaul project of the Hanging Temple scenic area began. It was not reopened to the public until May 2016.

== Overview ==
The entire 40 halls and pavilions are all built on cliffs which are over 30 metres (98 ft) from the ground. The distance from north to south is longer than from east to west and it becomes higher and higher from the gate in the south to north along the mountain. The temple can be divided into a northern and southern section.

=== Northern section ===
The northern section contains:

- Wufo Hall - The Hall of the Five Tathagatas
- Guanyin Hall (观音殿) - Hall of the bodhisattva Guanyin
- Hall of Three Religions (三教殿). The Hall of Three Religions mainly enshrines Buddhist deities as well as both Taoism and Confucianism. The statues of Śakyamuni (middle), Lao-Tze (left) and Confucius (right) are enshrined in the hall. This reflects the prevailing idea of "Three Teaching Harmonious as One" (三教合流) in the Ming and Qing dynasties (1368–1911).

=== Southern section ===
The southern part of the temple has three floors. It contains the following halls:

- Chunyang Palace - for worshiping Lü Dongbin - one of the Eight Immortals of Taoism
- Sanguan Hall (Hall of the Three Officials, 三官殿) - the largest hall in the temple, in which the "Three Great Emperor-Officials" (the officials of Heaven, Earth and Water) are worshiped with Ming era clay sculptures.
- Leiyin Hall (Thunder Hall) - A Buddhist hall dedicated to Buddha Śakyamuni located at the top of the southern section.

== Gallery ==
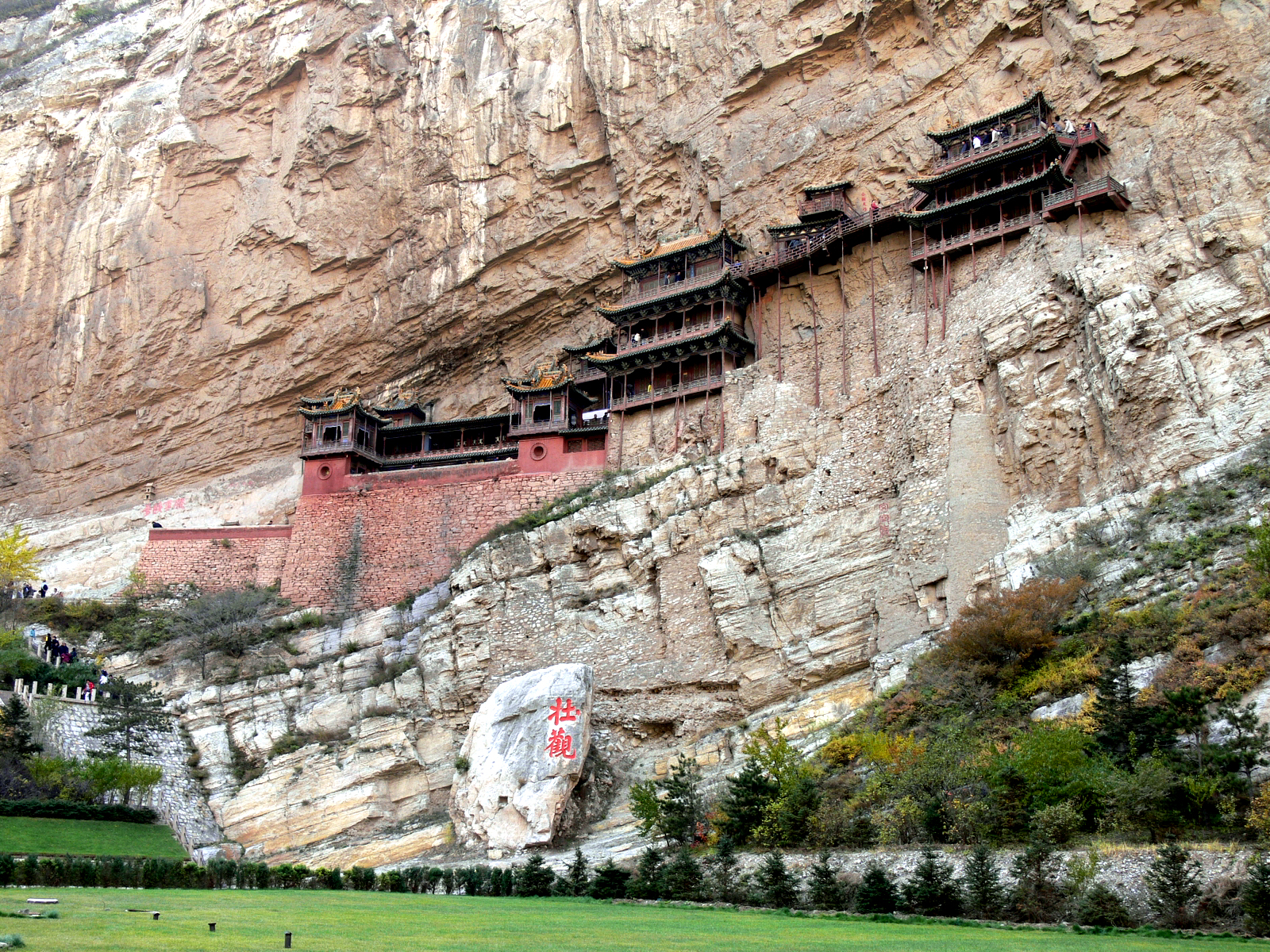

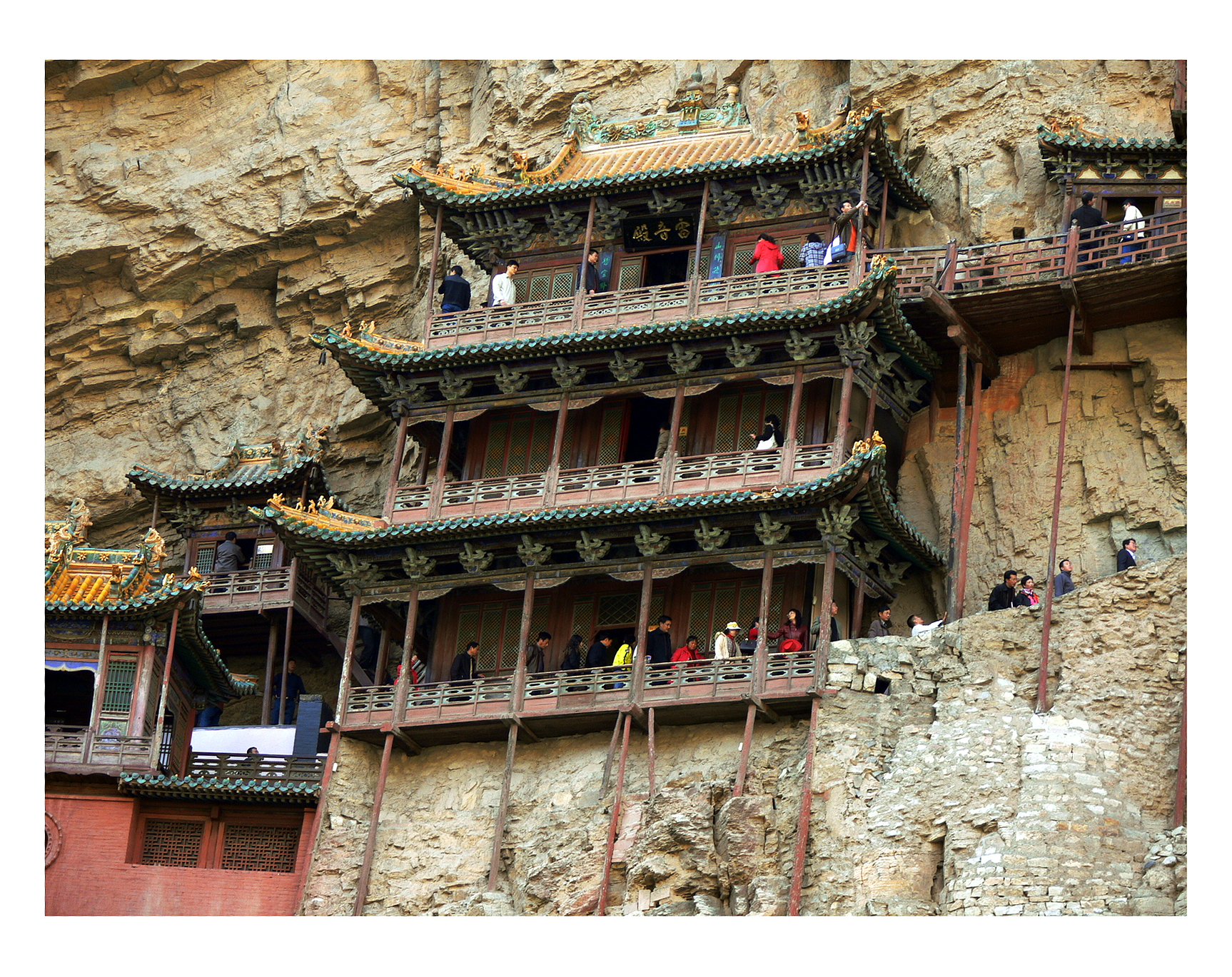

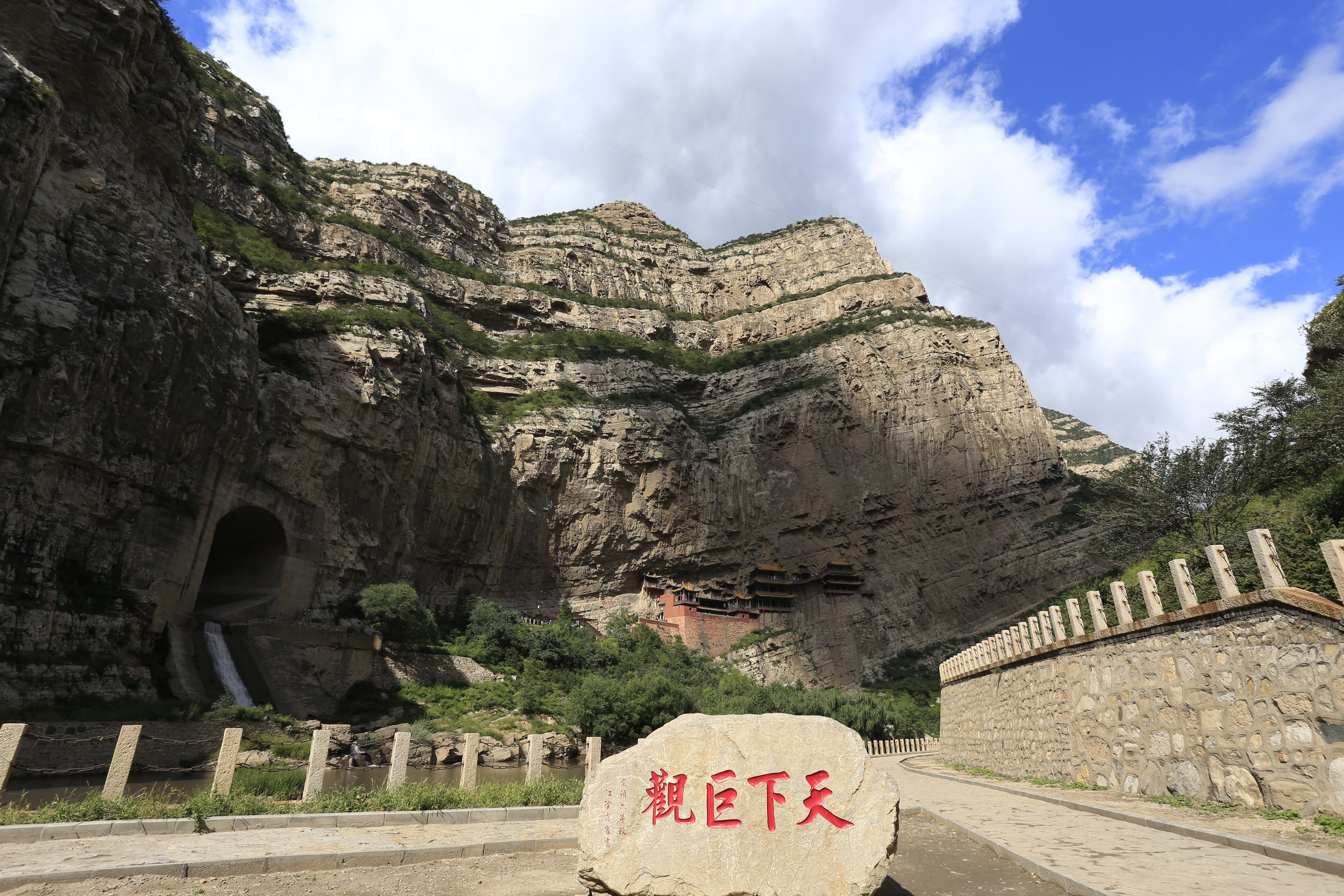

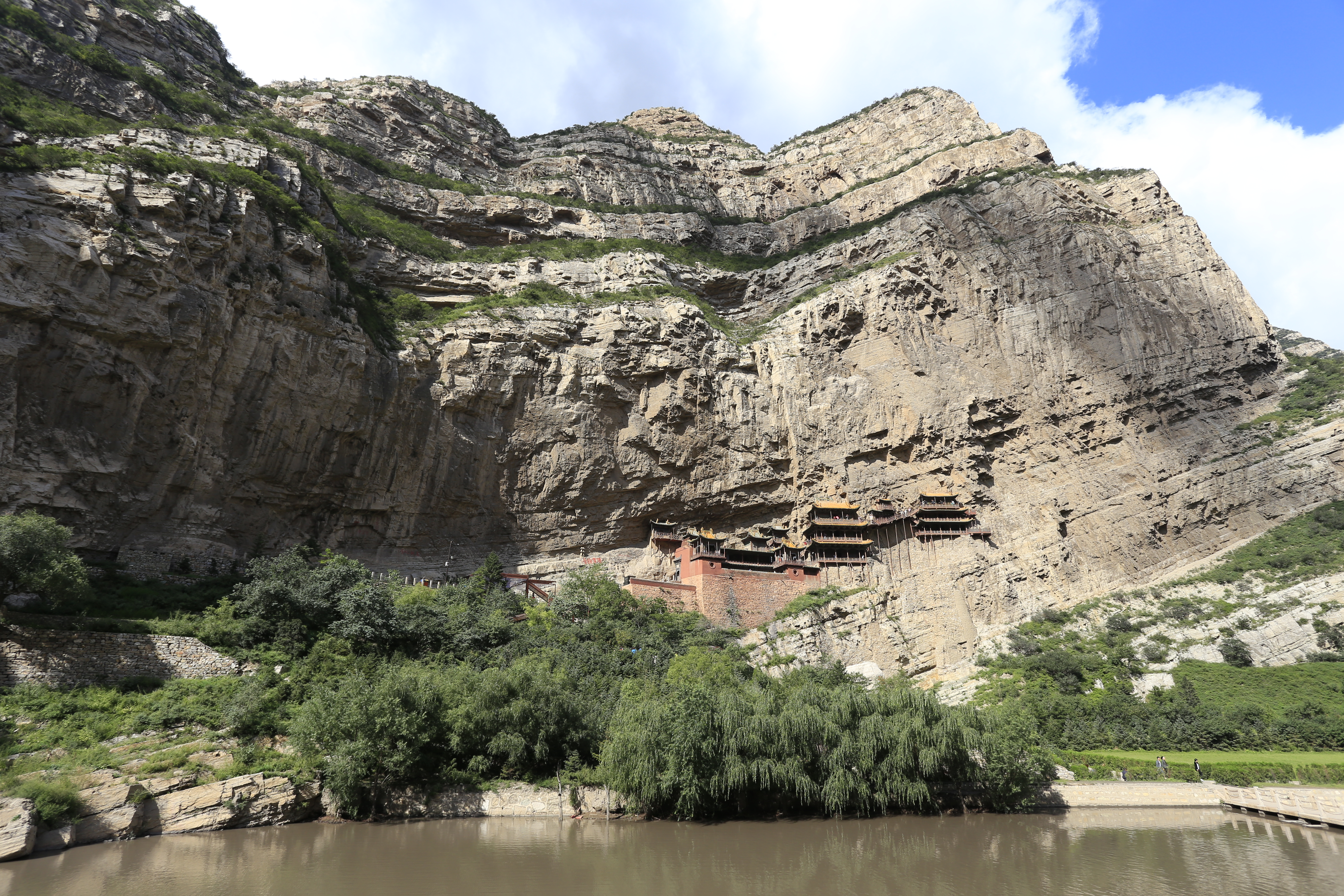

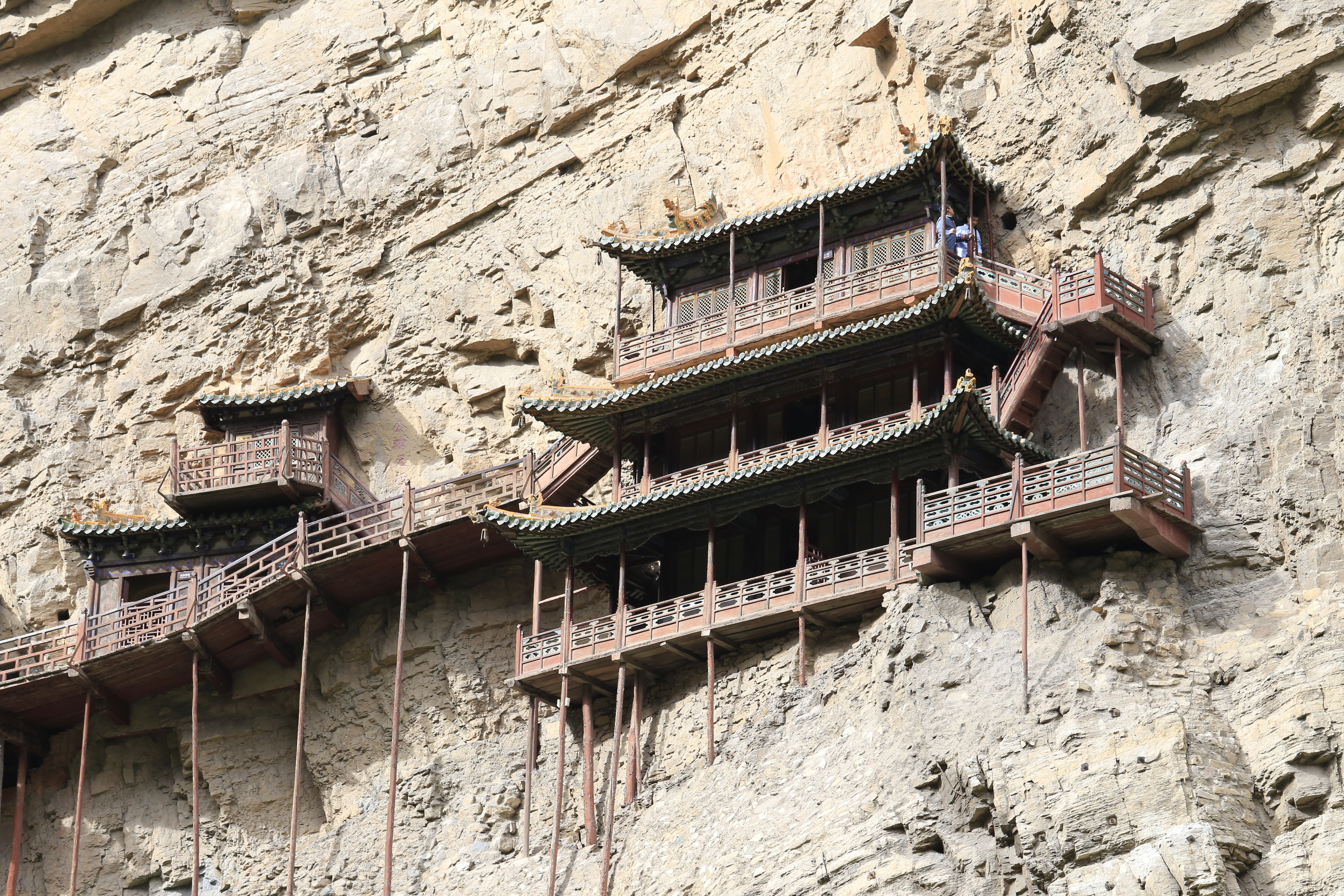

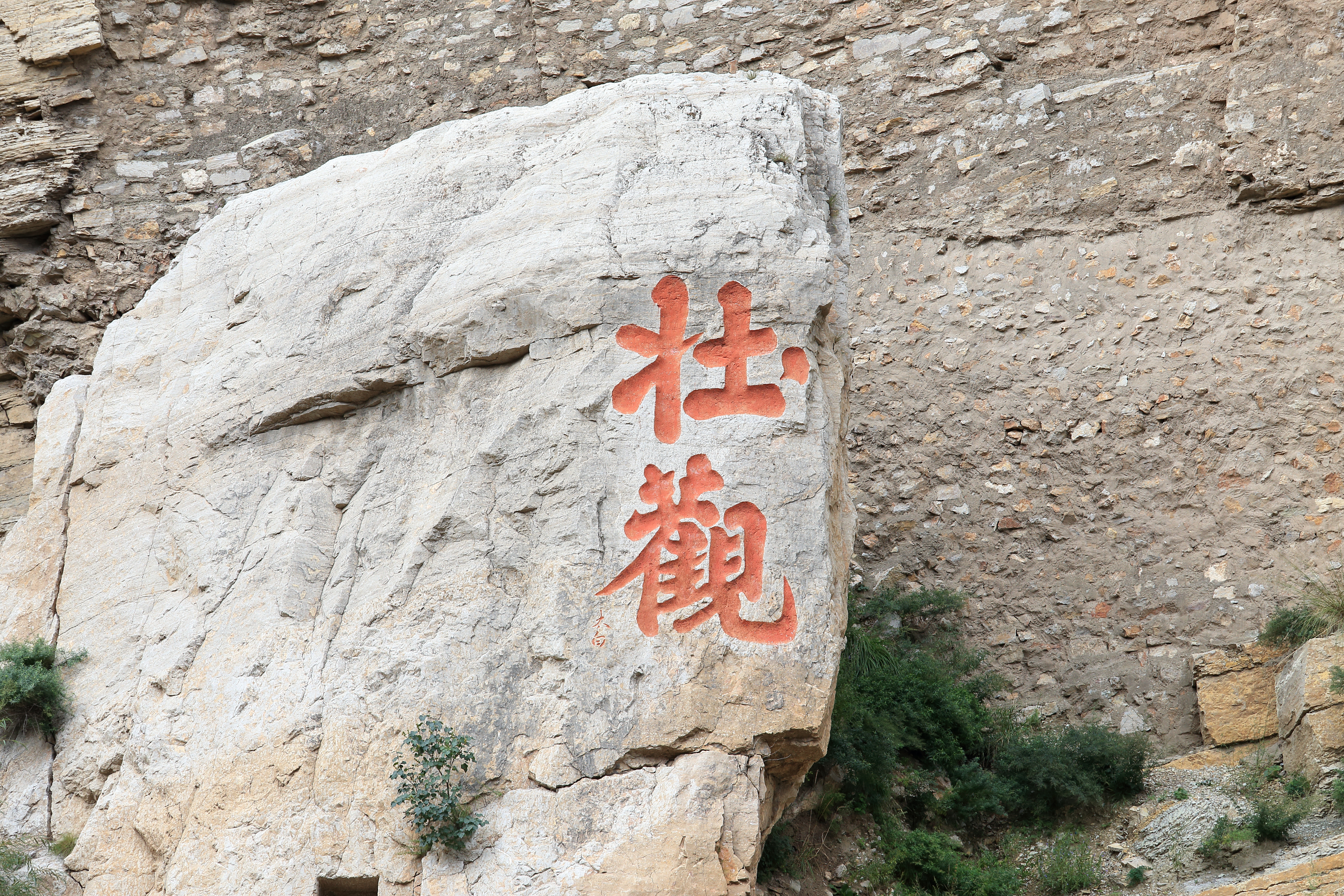

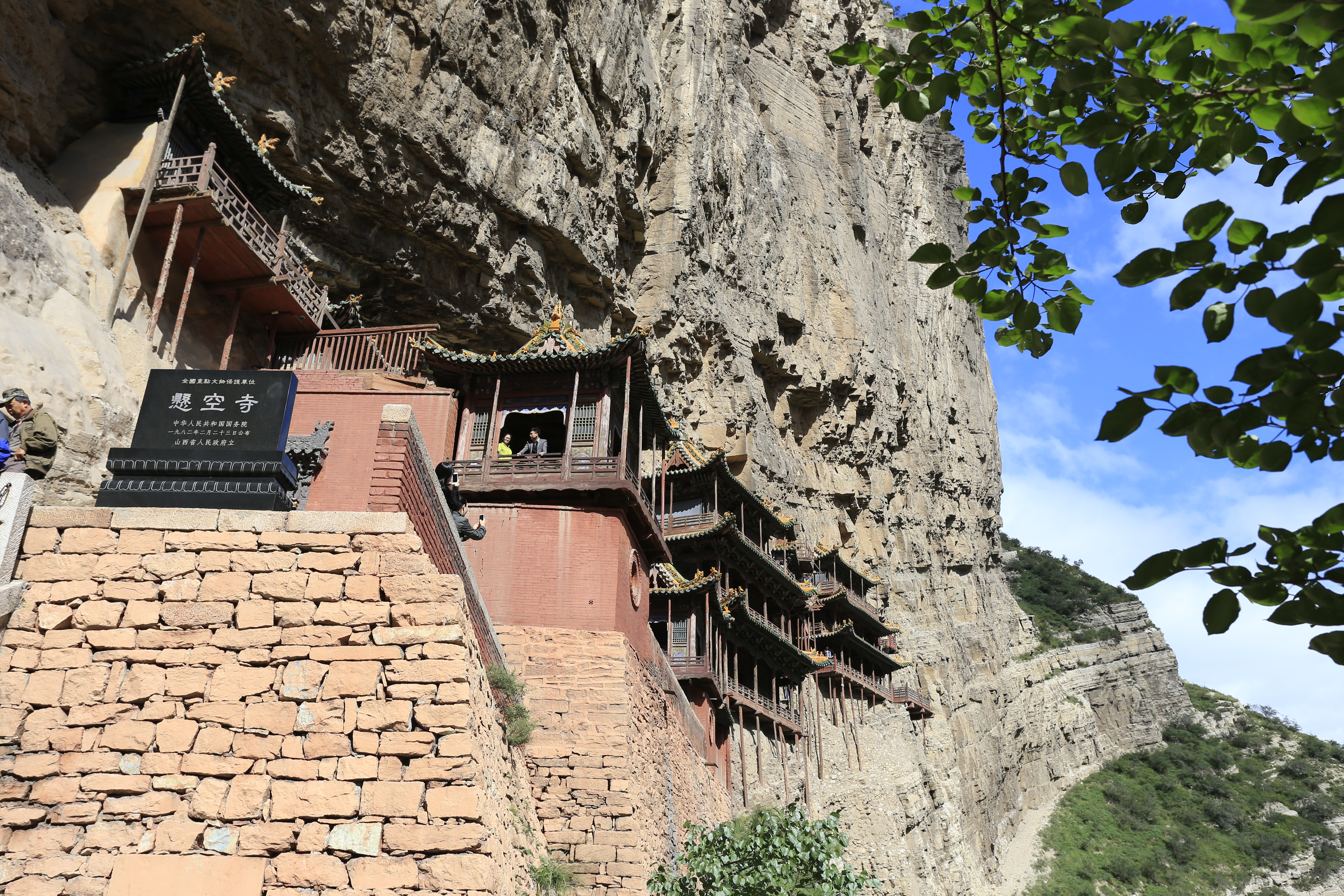

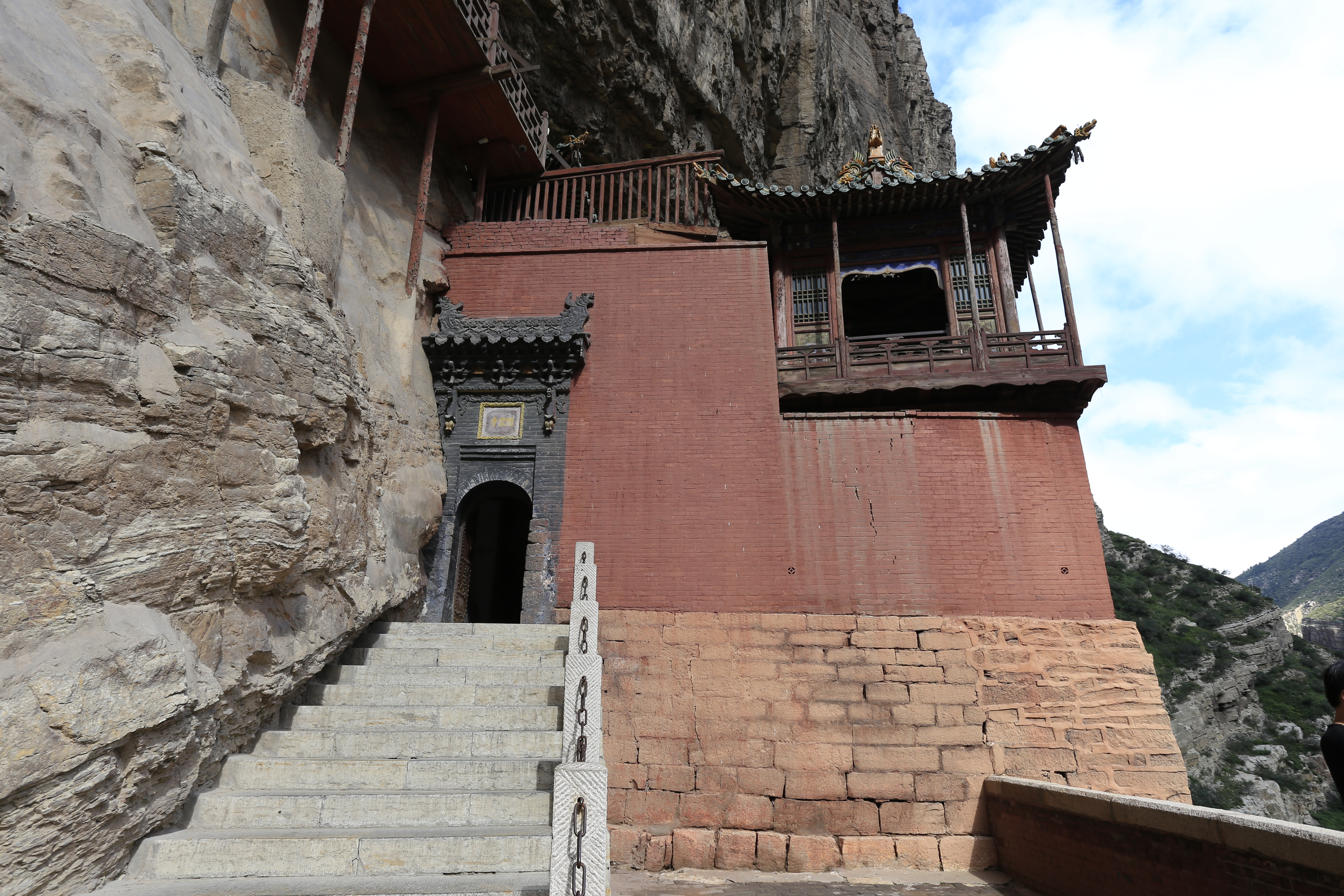

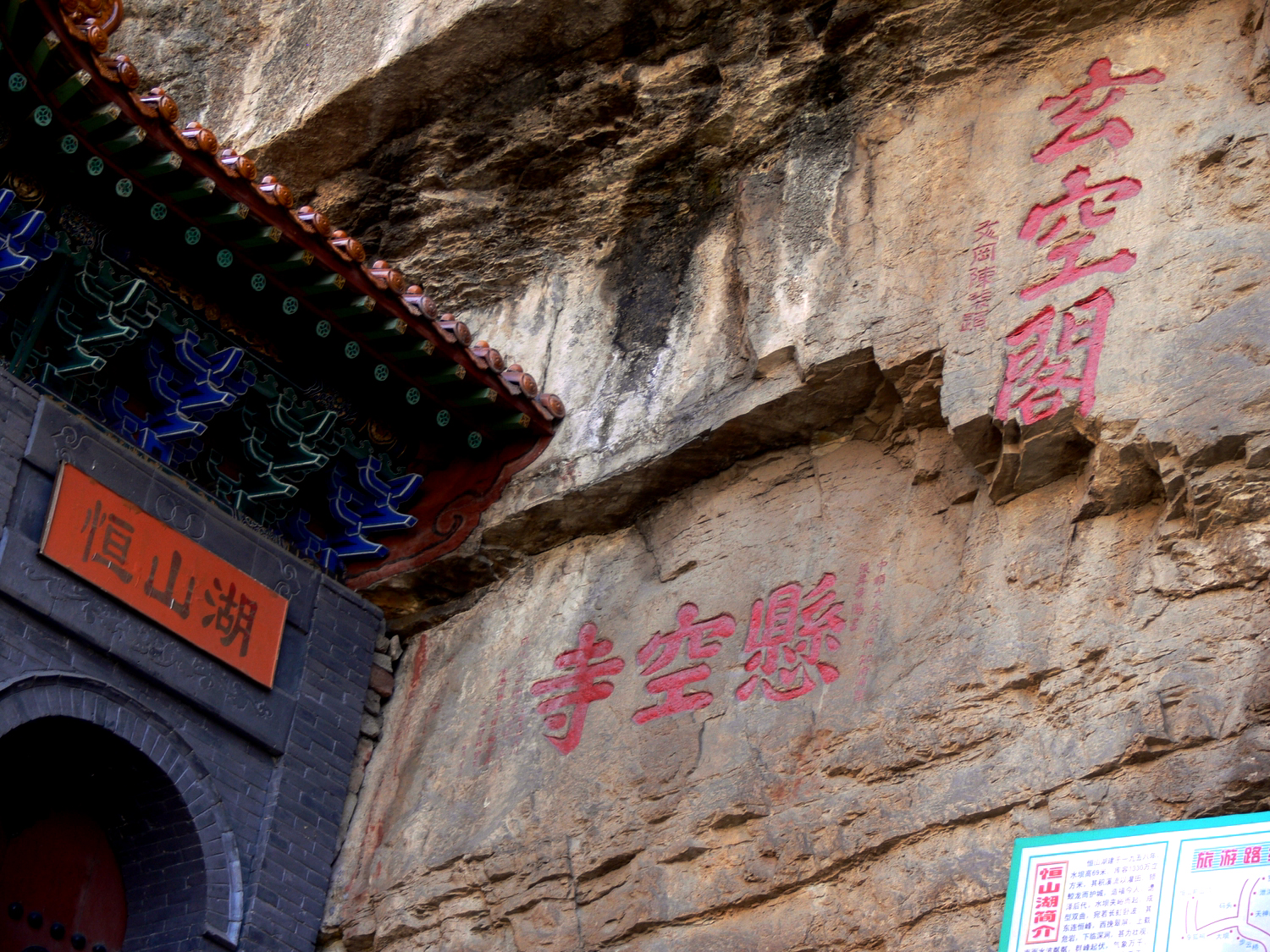

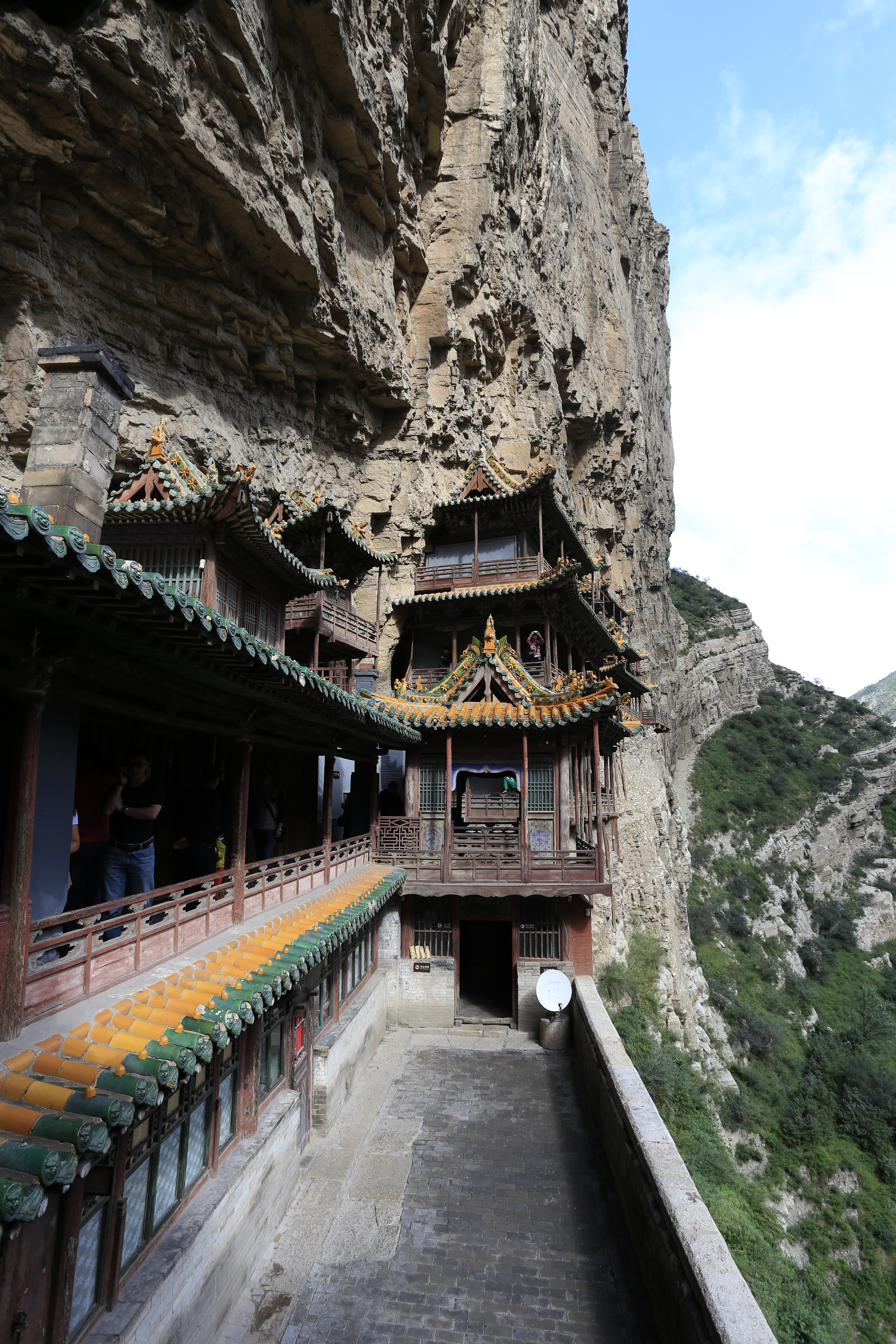

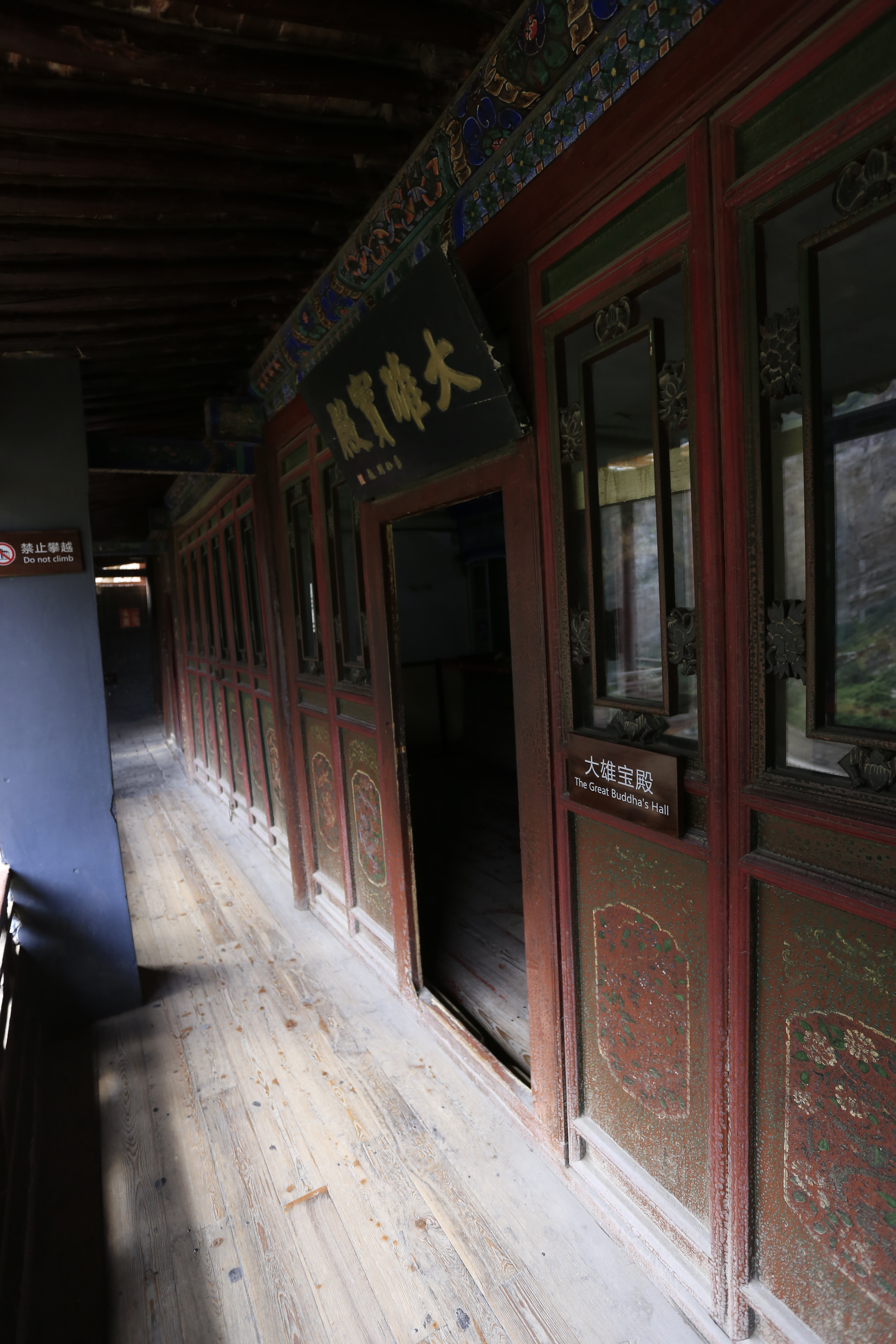

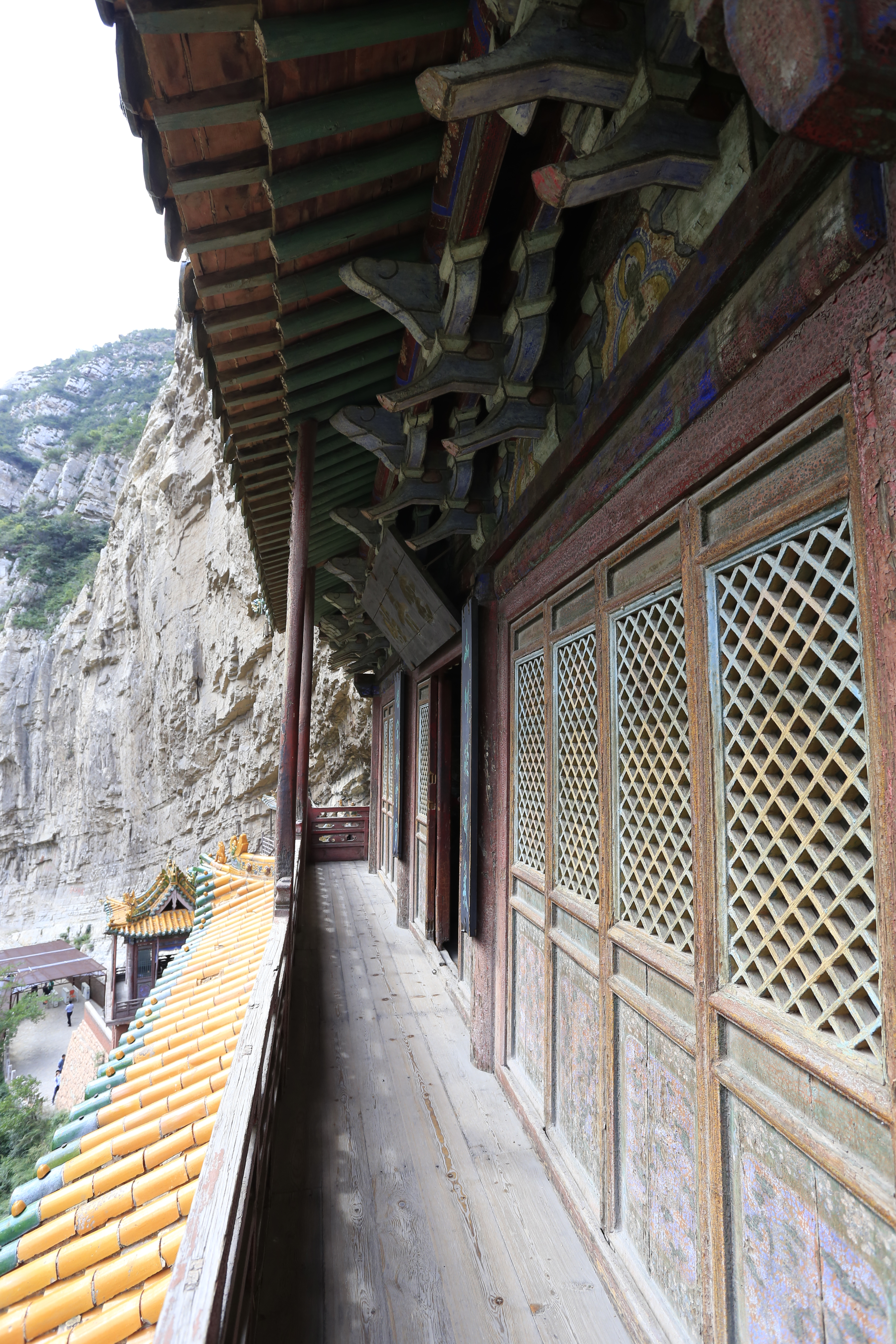

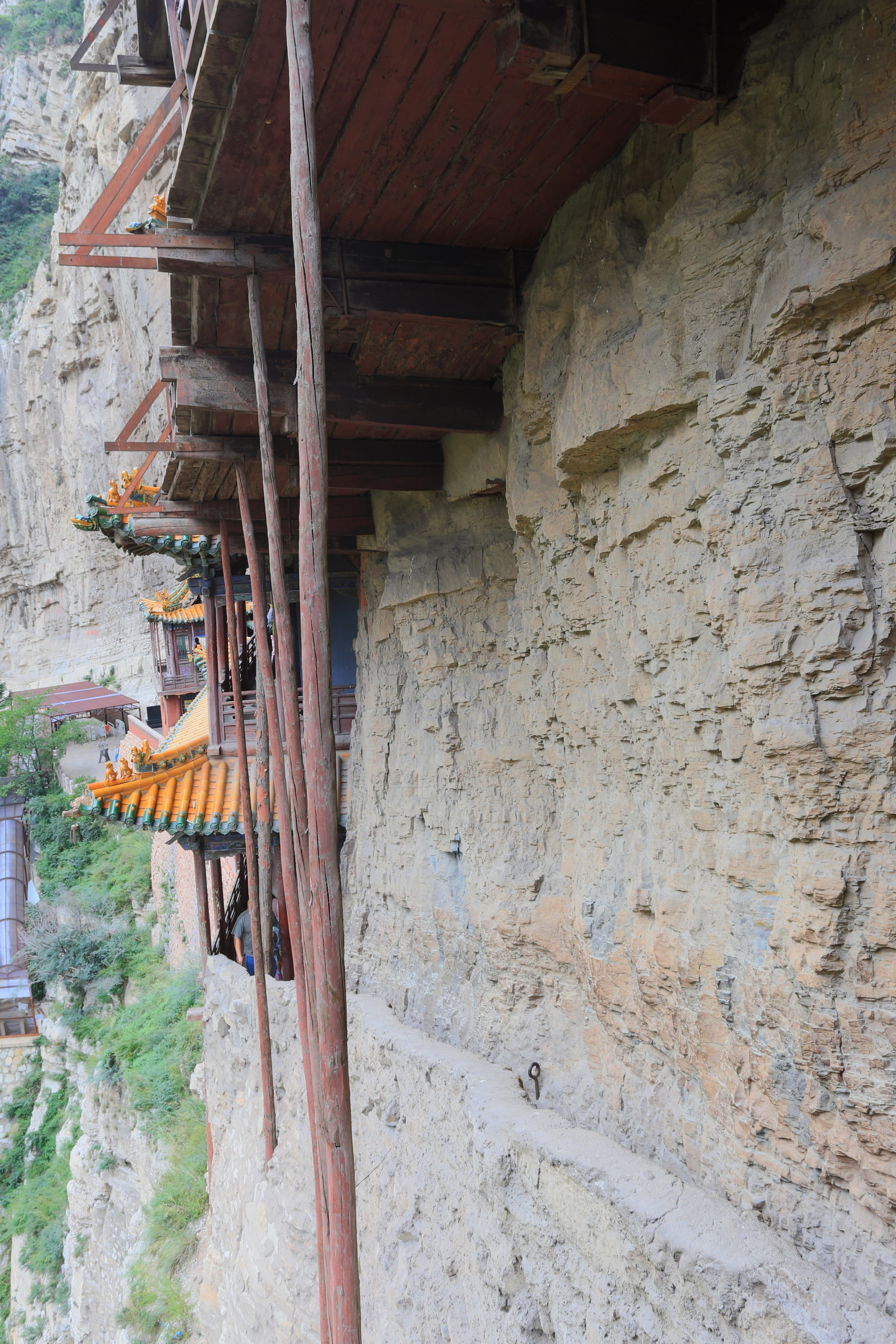

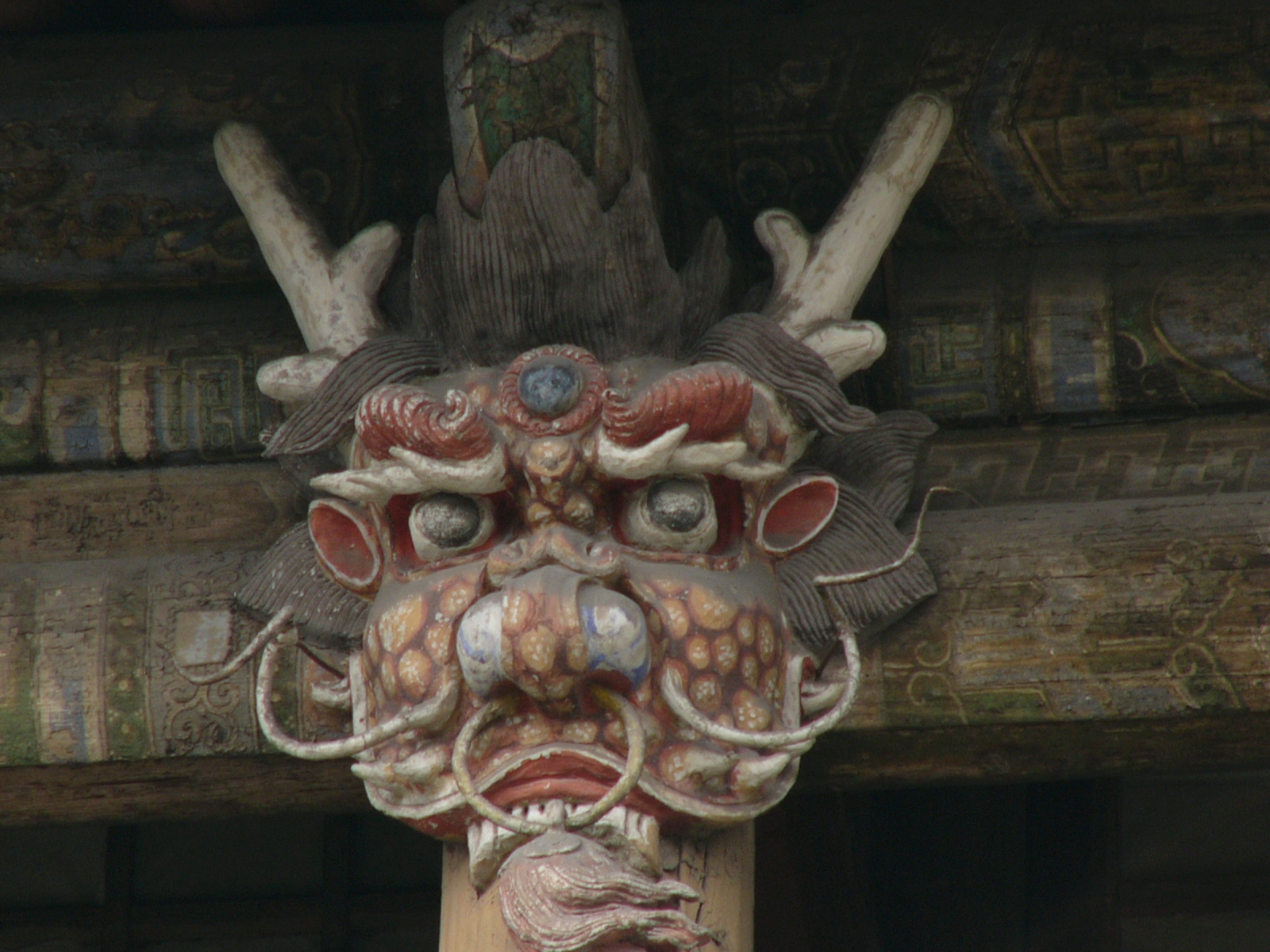

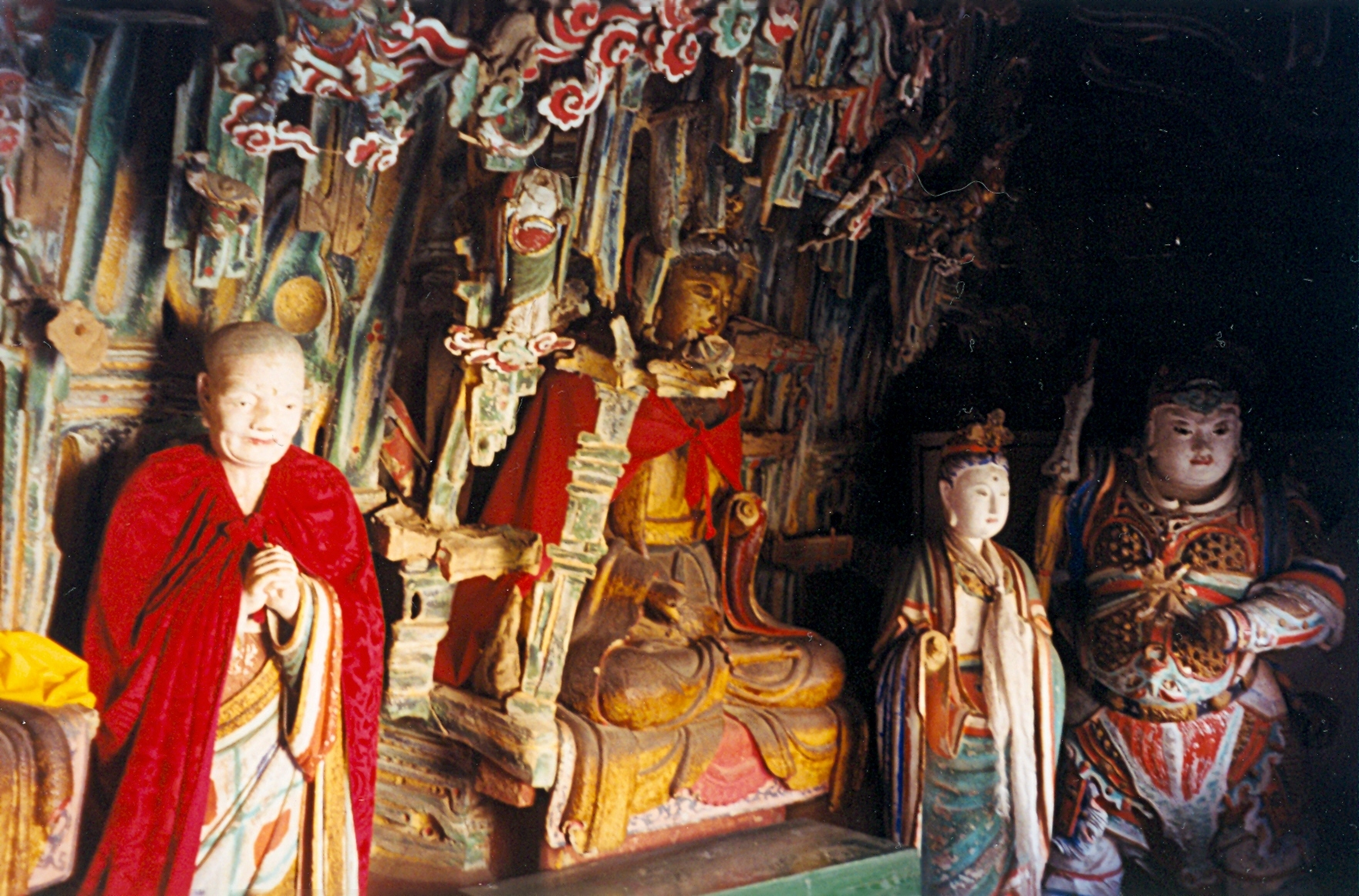

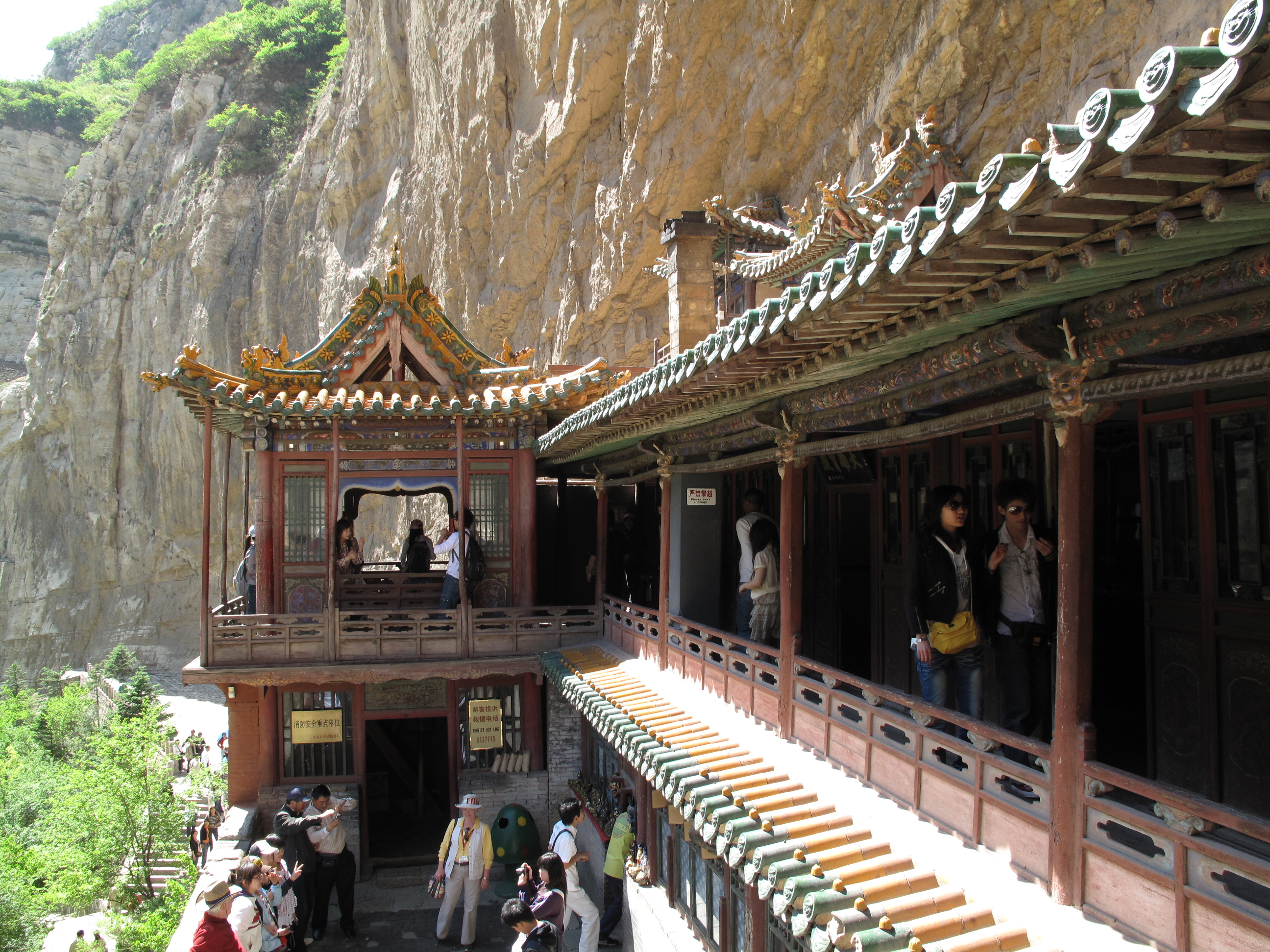

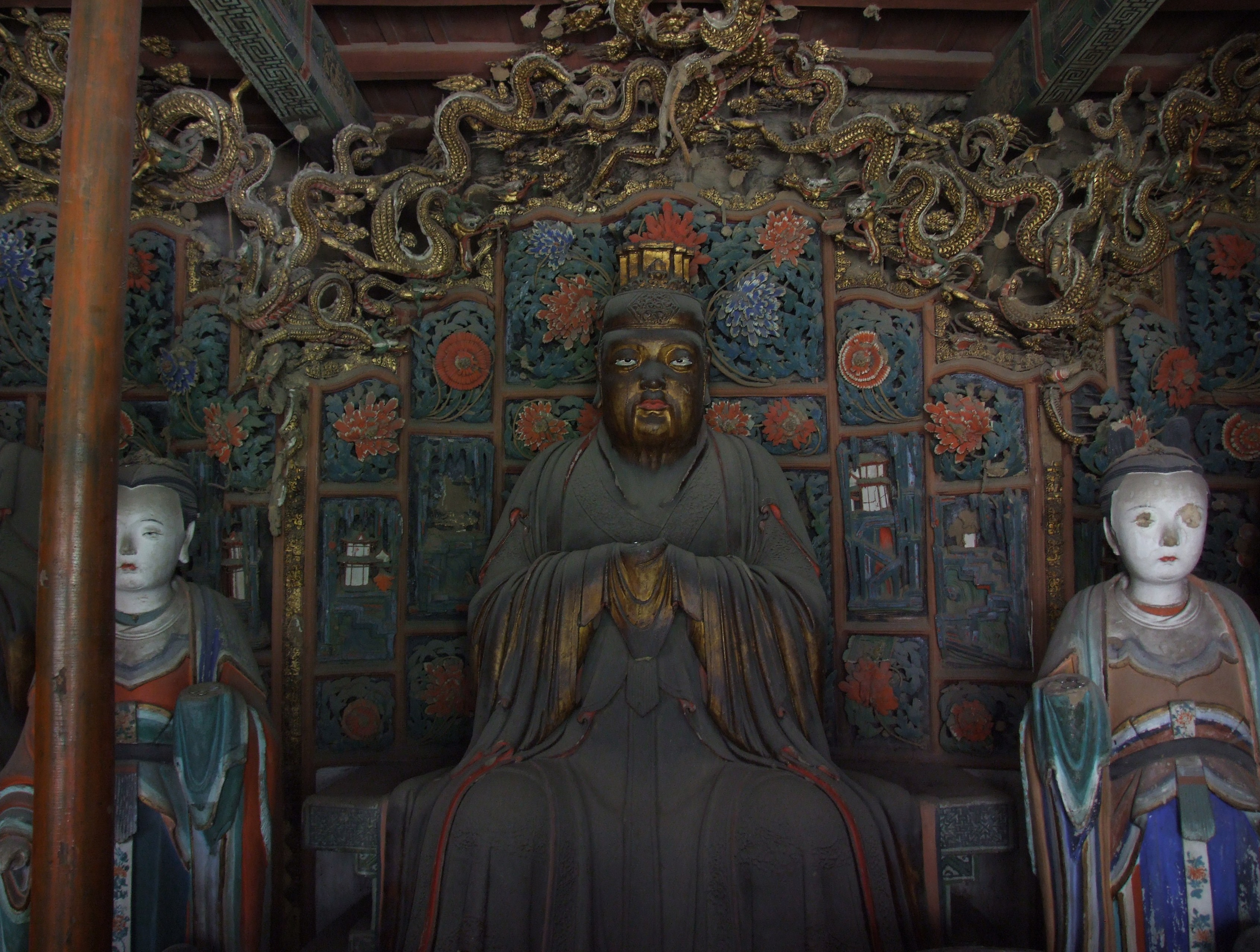

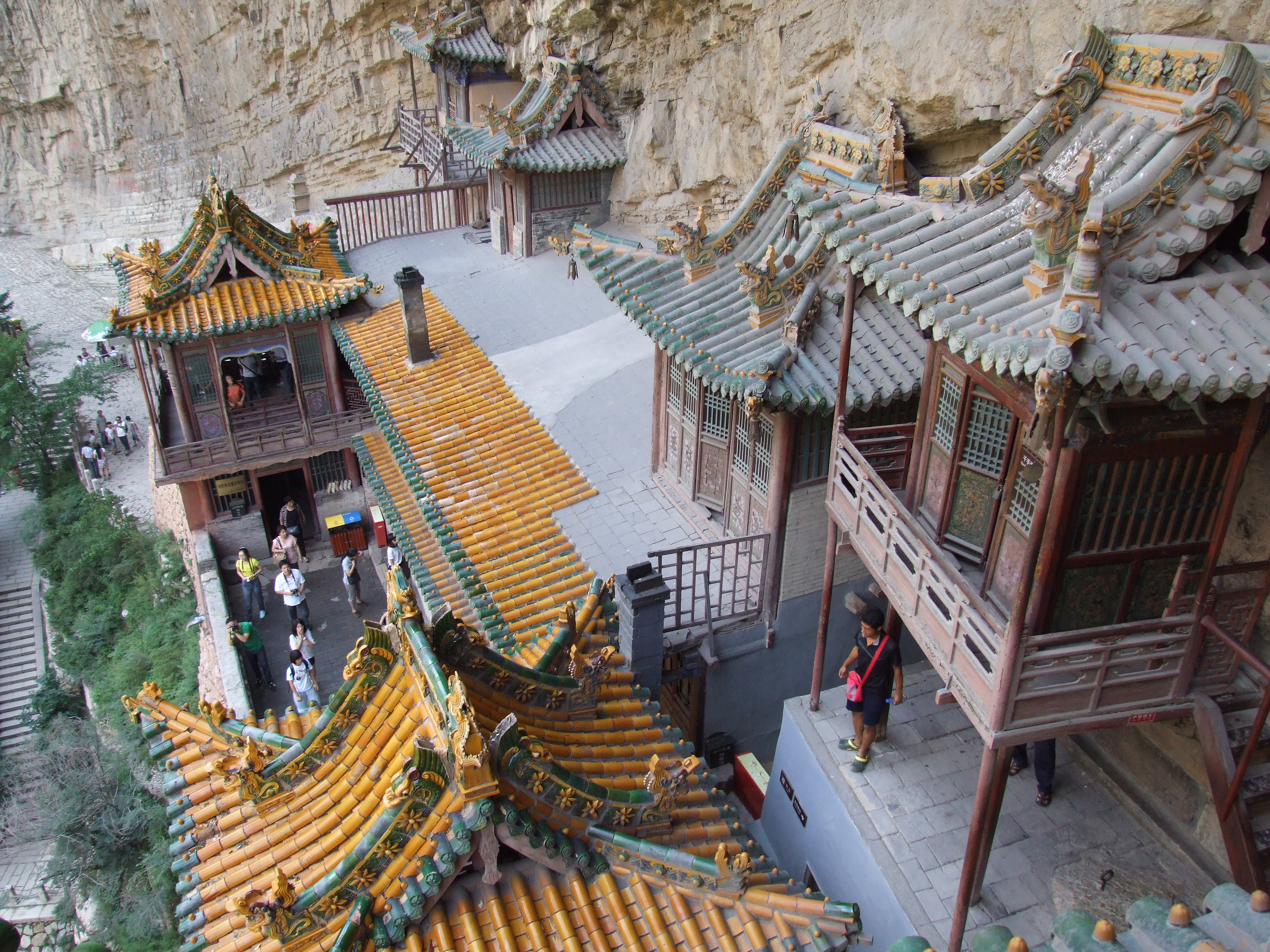
