= Hunyuan County =

Hunyuan County 浑源县 Hun-yüan
- County
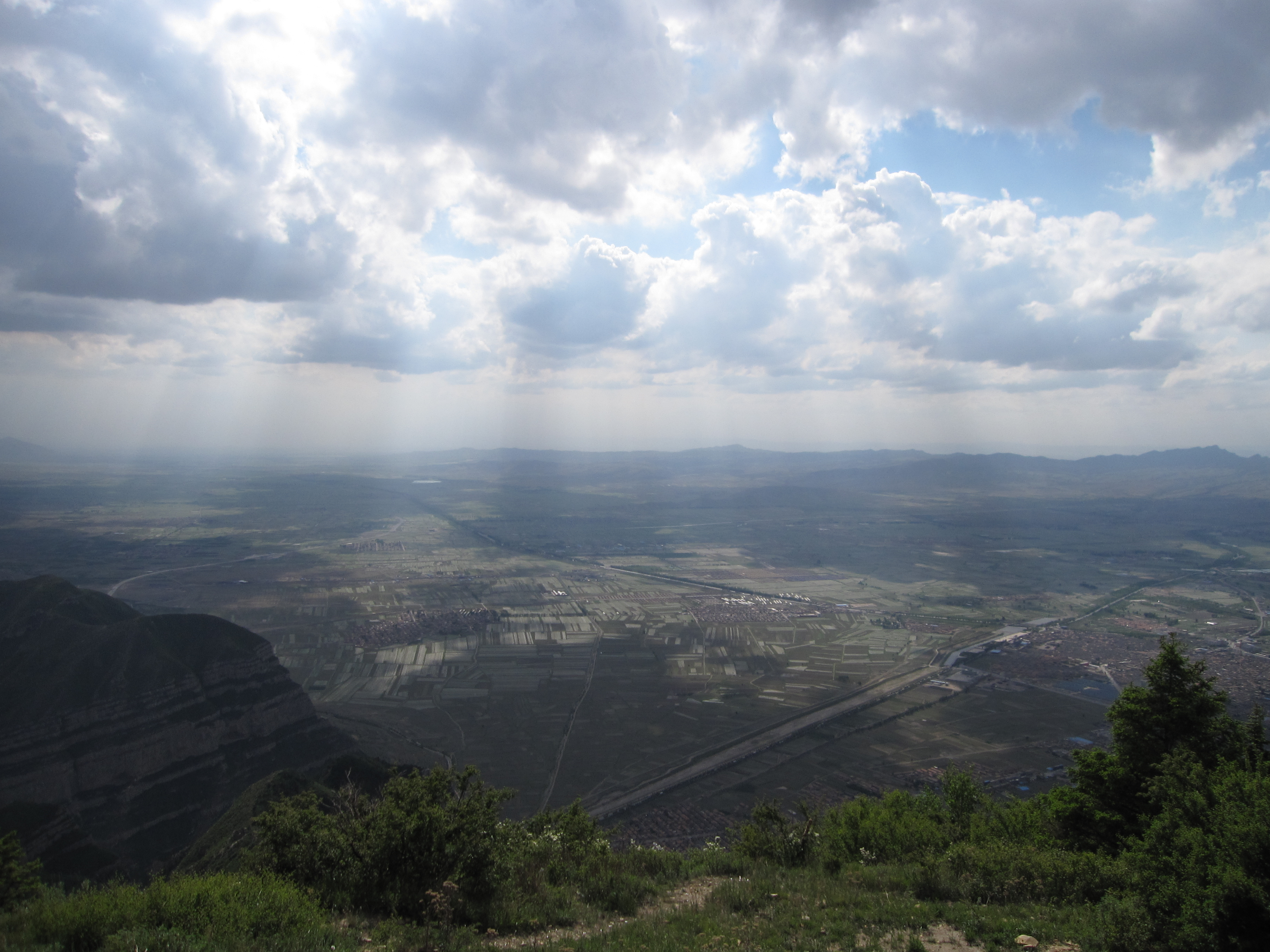

- Location in Shanxi
- Coordinates: 39.69°N 113.68°E
- Country: People's Republic of China
- Province: Shanxi
- Prefecture-level city: Datong

Area
  - Total: 1,965 km^{2} (759 sq mi)

Population (2020)
  - Total: 237,749
  - Density: 121.0/km^{2} (313.4/sq mi)
- Time zone: UTC+8 (China Standard)
- Postal code: 037400
- Website: www.hunyuan.gov.cn

Hunyuan County
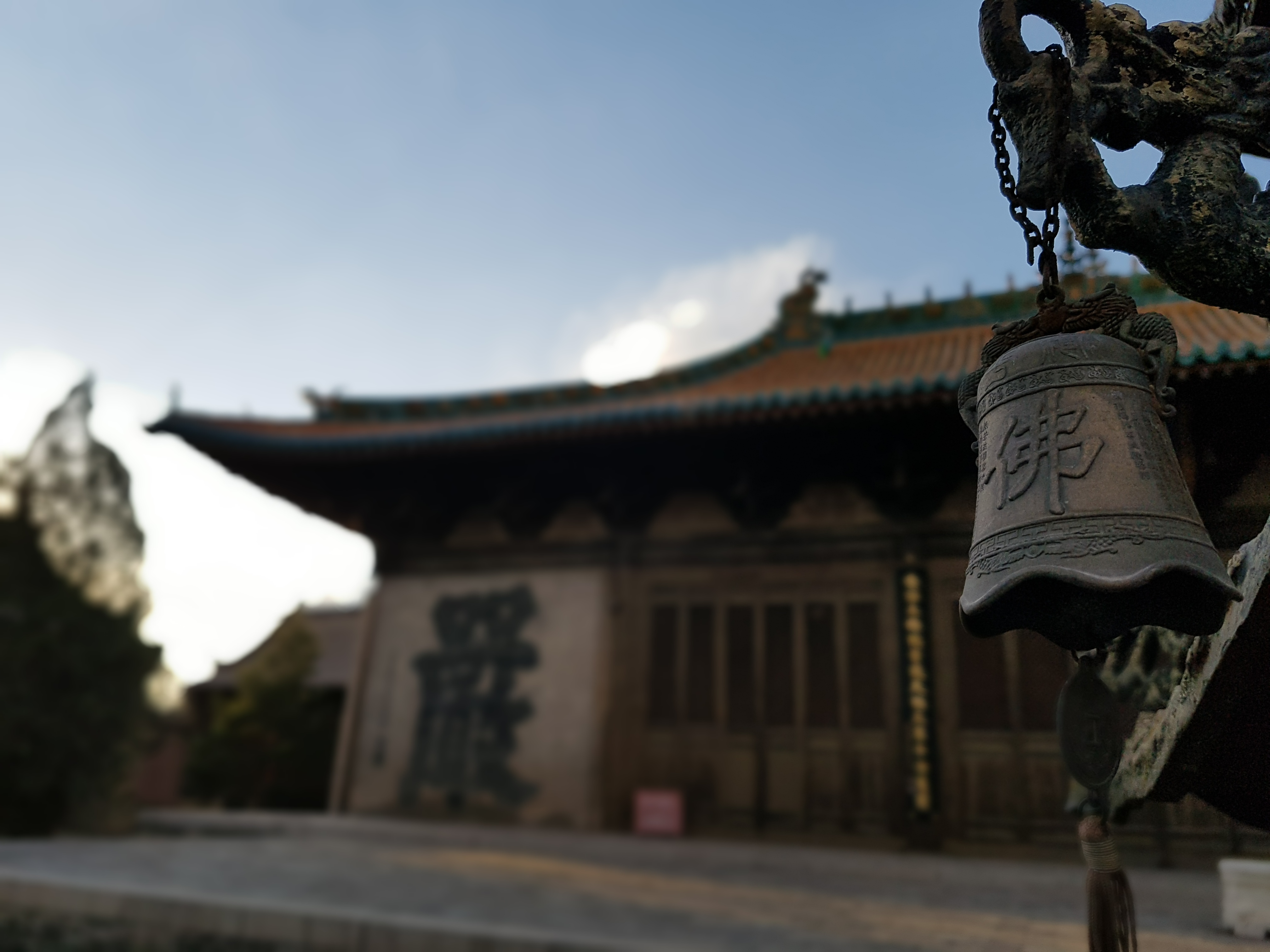
- Yong'an Temple, Hunyuan
- Simplified Chinese: 浑源县
- Traditional Chinese: 渾源縣
Transcriptions
Standard Mandarin
- Hanyu Pinyin: Húnyuán Xiàn
Yue: Cantonese
- Jyutping: wan^{4}jyun^{4} jyun^{2}

Guo County
- Simplified Chinese: 崞县
- Traditional Chinese: 崞縣
Transcriptions
Standard Mandarin
- Hanyu Pinyin: Guōxiàn; Guō Xiàn
- Wade–Giles: Kuo-hsien; Kuo Hsien
Yue: Cantonese
- Jyutping: gwok^{3} jyun^{2}

Hunyuan County is a county under the administration of Datong City, in the northeast of Shanxi province, China.

== History ==
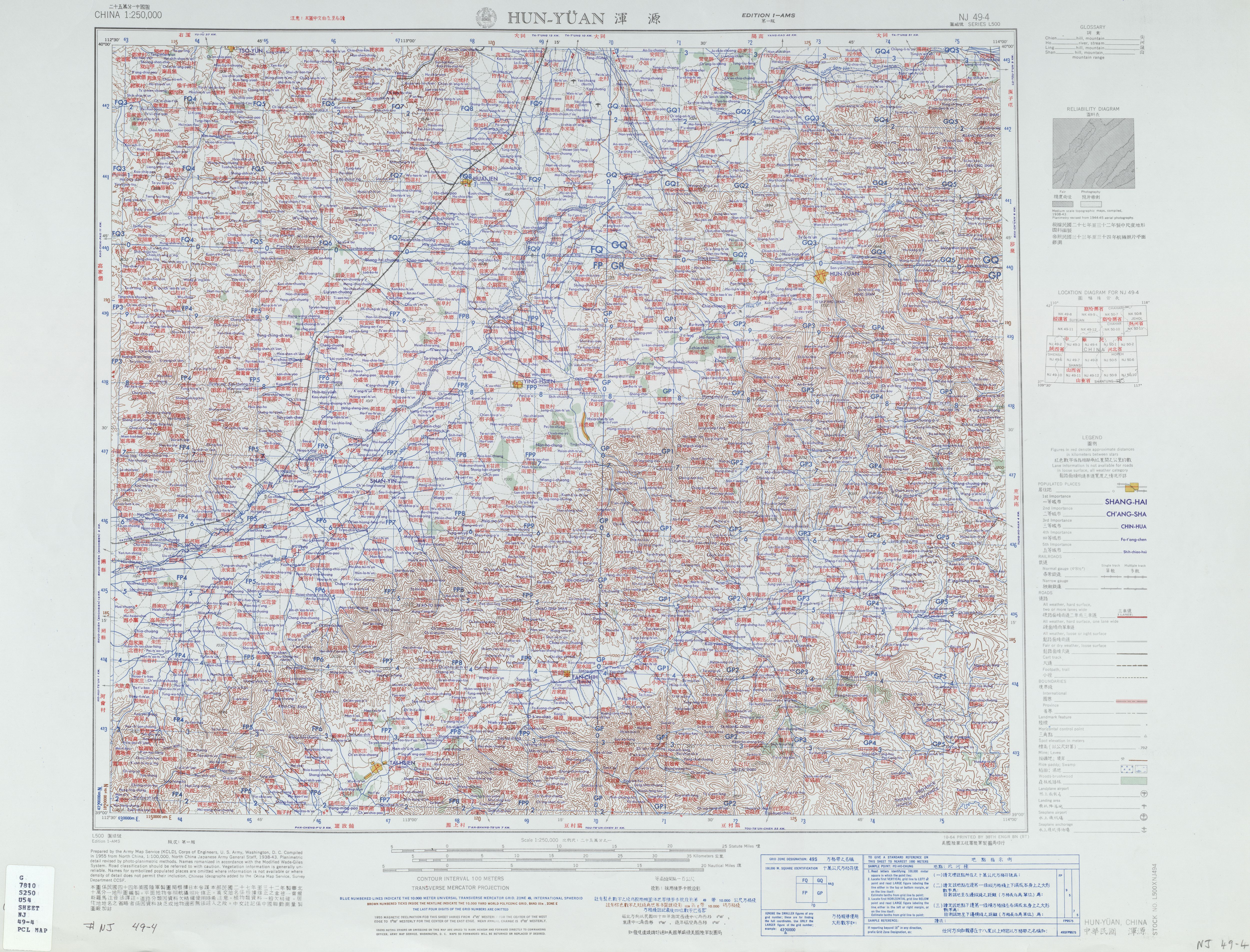
Map including Hunyuan (labeled as HUN-YÜAN 渾源) (AMS, 1955)

During the Spring and Autumn period of Chinese history, present-day Hunyuan County formed part of the Baidi state of Dai to the north of the Zhou Kingdom. It was conquered by the Zhao clan of Jin.

Under the Han, Guo County was established and placed under Yanmen Commandery and Pingshu County was established and placed under Dai Commandery. Pingshu was later merged with Guo County, which was placed in Hengshan Commandery. During the Jianwu era of the Eastern Han, Guo County was renamed. During the Three Kingdoms, Wei restored the name Guo. This was changed to Guoshan County by the Northern Wei, who placed it under the administration of Si Prefecture. Under the Tang, it was placed in Yun Prefecture.

== Climate ==
Climate data for Hunyuan, elevation 1,079 m (3,540 ft), (1991–2020 normals, extremes 1981–2010)
Month	Jan	Feb	Mar	Apr	May	Jun	Jul	Aug	Sep	Oct	Nov	Dec	Year
Record high °C (°F)	11.5 (52.7)	20.4 (68.7)	25.6 (78.1)	34.8 (94.6)	35.1 (95.2)	39.7 (103.5)	37.7 (99.9)	34.3 (93.7)	33.9 (93.0)	28.0 (82.4)	21.2 (70.2)	15.2 (59.4)	39.7 (103.5)
Mean daily maximum °C (°F)	−2.3 (27.9)	2.5 (36.5)	9.5 (49.1)	17.4 (63.3)	23.6 (74.5)	27.5 (81.5)	28.5 (83.3)	27.0 (80.6)	22.4 (72.3)	15.5 (59.9)	6.7 (44.1)	−0.7 (30.7)	14.8 (58.6)
Daily mean °C (°F)	−10.9 (12.4)	−6.0 (21.2)	1.5 (34.7)	9.6 (49.3)	16.3 (61.3)	20.6 (69.1)	22.2 (72.0)	20.2 (68.4)	14.8 (58.6)	7.4 (45.3)	−1.1 (30.0)	−8.6 (16.5)	7.2 (44.9)
Mean daily minimum °C (°F)	−17.5 (0.5)	−13.0 (8.6)	−5.6 (21.9)	1.5 (34.7)	8.1 (46.6)	13.2 (55.8)	15.8 (60.4)	13.9 (57.0)	7.9 (46.2)	0.8 (33.4)	−7.1 (19.2)	−14.7 (5.5)	0.3 (32.5)
Record low °C (°F)	−31.4 (−24.5)	−29.0 (−20.2)	−25.1 (−13.2)	−12.3 (9.9)	−6.7 (19.9)	2.3 (36.1)	5.9 (42.6)	2.2 (36.0)	−3.7 (25.3)	−12.0 (10.4)	−24.1 (−11.4)	−30.3 (−22.5)	−31.4 (−24.5)
Average precipitation mm (inches)	2.7 (0.11)	4.8 (0.19)	8.0 (0.31)	17.8 (0.70)	38.9 (1.53)	53.8 (2.12)	95.5 (3.76)	89.6 (3.53)	57.2 (2.25)	27.0 (1.06)	9.5 (0.37)	2.8 (0.11)	407.6 (16.04)
Average precipitation days (≥ 0.1 mm)	2.8	3.3	4.3	5.6	8.0	10.9	12.6	11.6	9.2	6.4	4.1	2.9	81.7
Average snowy days	3.9	4.7	4.4	1.4	0.1	0	0	0	0	0.5	3.8	4.1	22.9
Average relative humidity (%)	56	50	46	42	42	53	67	71	68	62	59	57	56
Mean monthly sunshine hours	167.4	175.1	216.6	232.4	256.8	238.3	233.5	228.5	212.9	205.9	173.6	161.2	2,502.2
Percentage possible sunshine	55	57	58	58	58	53	52	54	58	60	59	56	57
Source: China Meteorological Administration

== Landmarks ==
The 1,500-year-old Hanging Temple is an important and unique structure within Hunyuan County.

== Demography ==
In 2010 the population of the district was 343,486 inhabitants.

== See also ==
- Hanging Temple
- Mount Heng (Shanxi)
