= Pingyao Catholic Church =

- 平遥天主堂
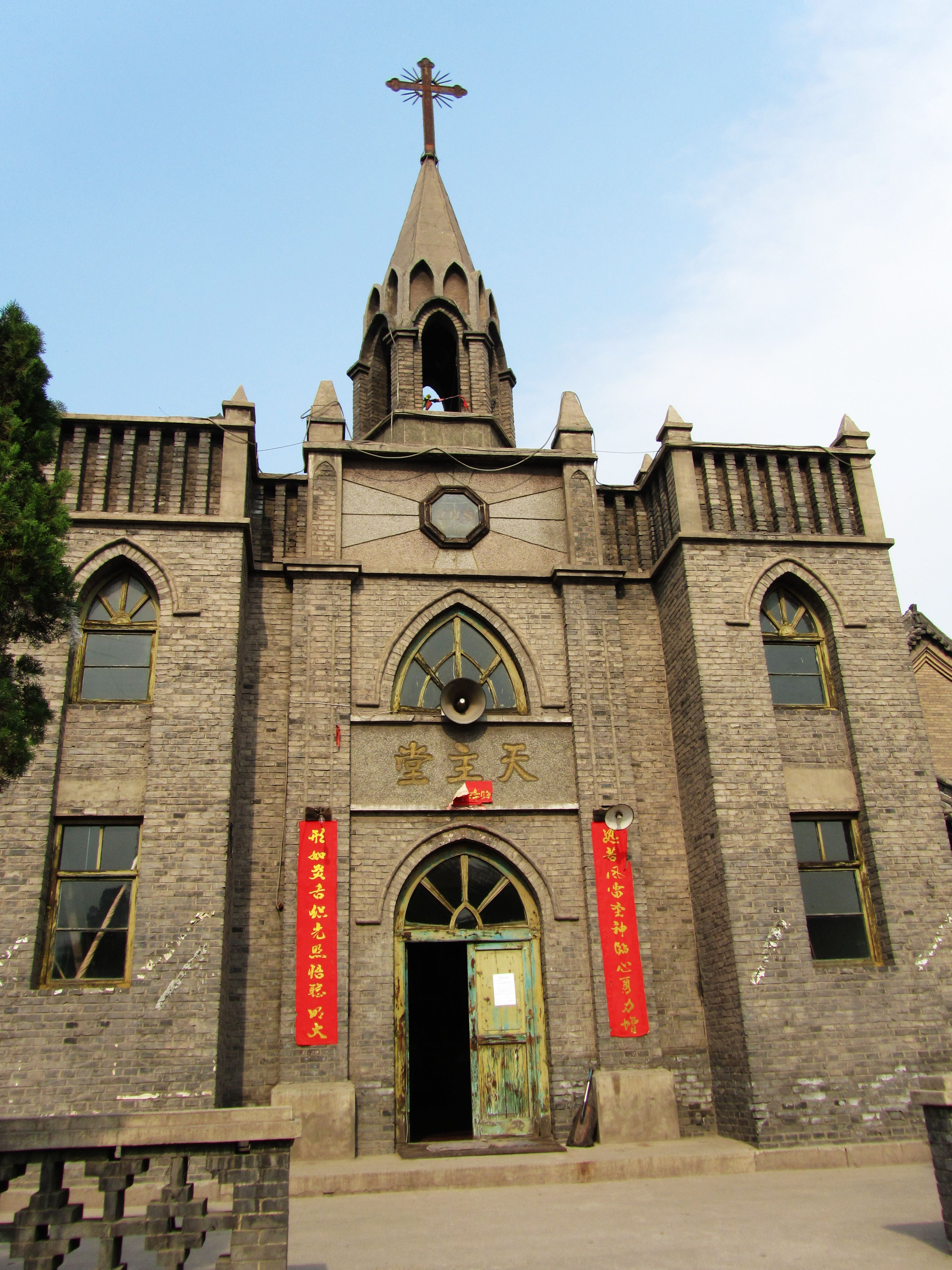
- Pingyao Catholic Church in 2011

- Location in Shanxi
- 37°12′31″N 112°11′52″E
- Location: Pingyao County, Shanxi, China
- Denomination: Roman Catholic

History
- Status: Church
- Founded: 1910

Architecture
- Functional status: Active
- Architectural type: Church building
- Style: Romanesque architecture

Specifications
- Materials: Granite, bricks

Chinese name
- Simplified Chinese: 平遥天主堂
- Traditional Chinese: 平遙天主堂
Transcriptions
Standard Mandarin
- Hanyu Pinyin: Píngyáo Tiānzhǔtáng

Pingyao Catholic Church (Chinese: 平遥天主堂) is a Roman Catholic church located in Pingyao County, Shanxi, China.

== History ==
Christianity spread into the country as early as 1886 by an Italian missionary. The church traces its origins to the former Wudao Temple (五道庙), founded in 1910. It was severely damaged by the Red Guards during the ten-year Cultural Revolution. The current version was completed in 1984. In November 2011, it was inscribed as a municipal cultural relic preservation organ by the Pingyao government.

== Gallery ==
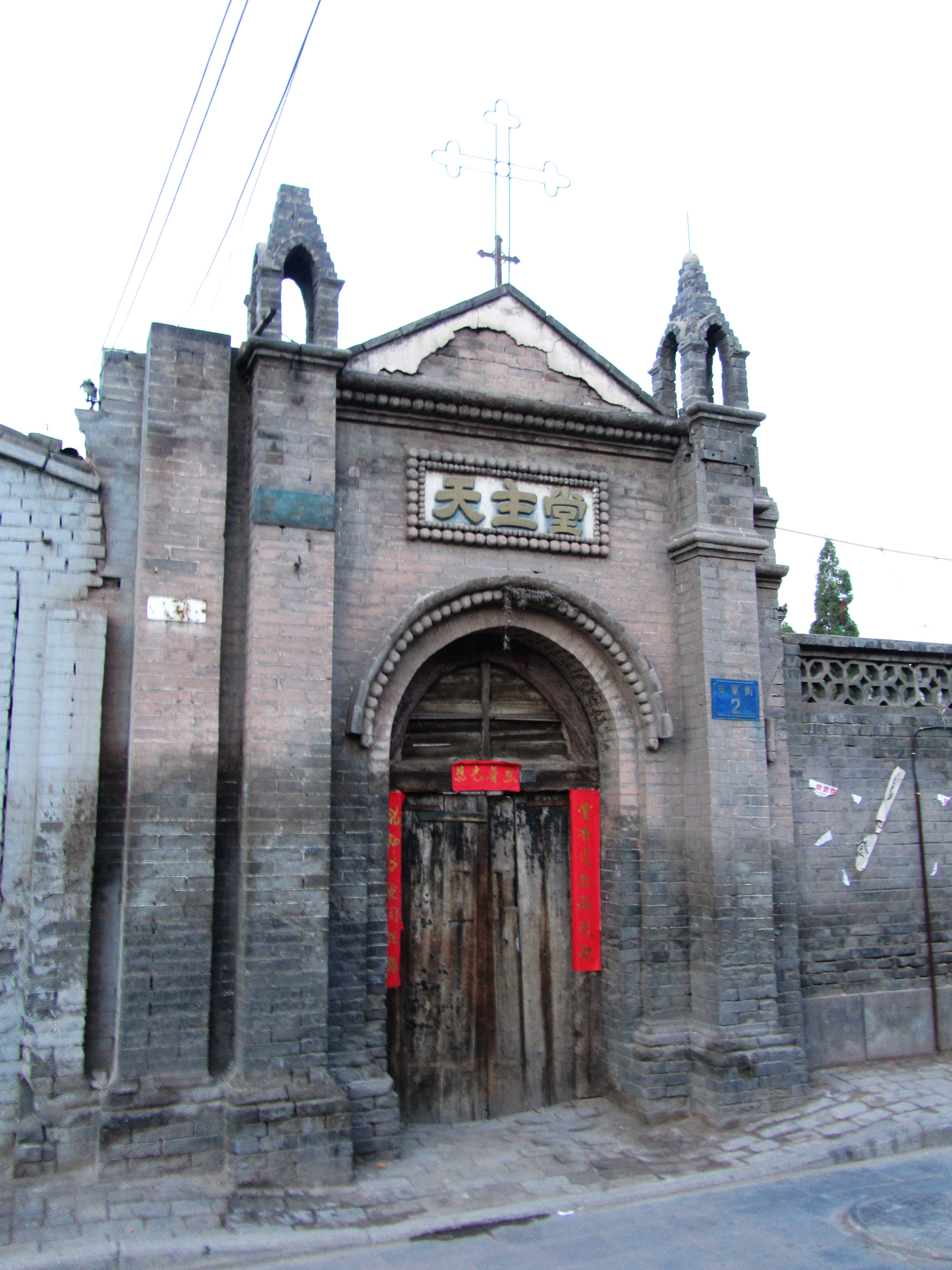
Pingyao Catholic Church

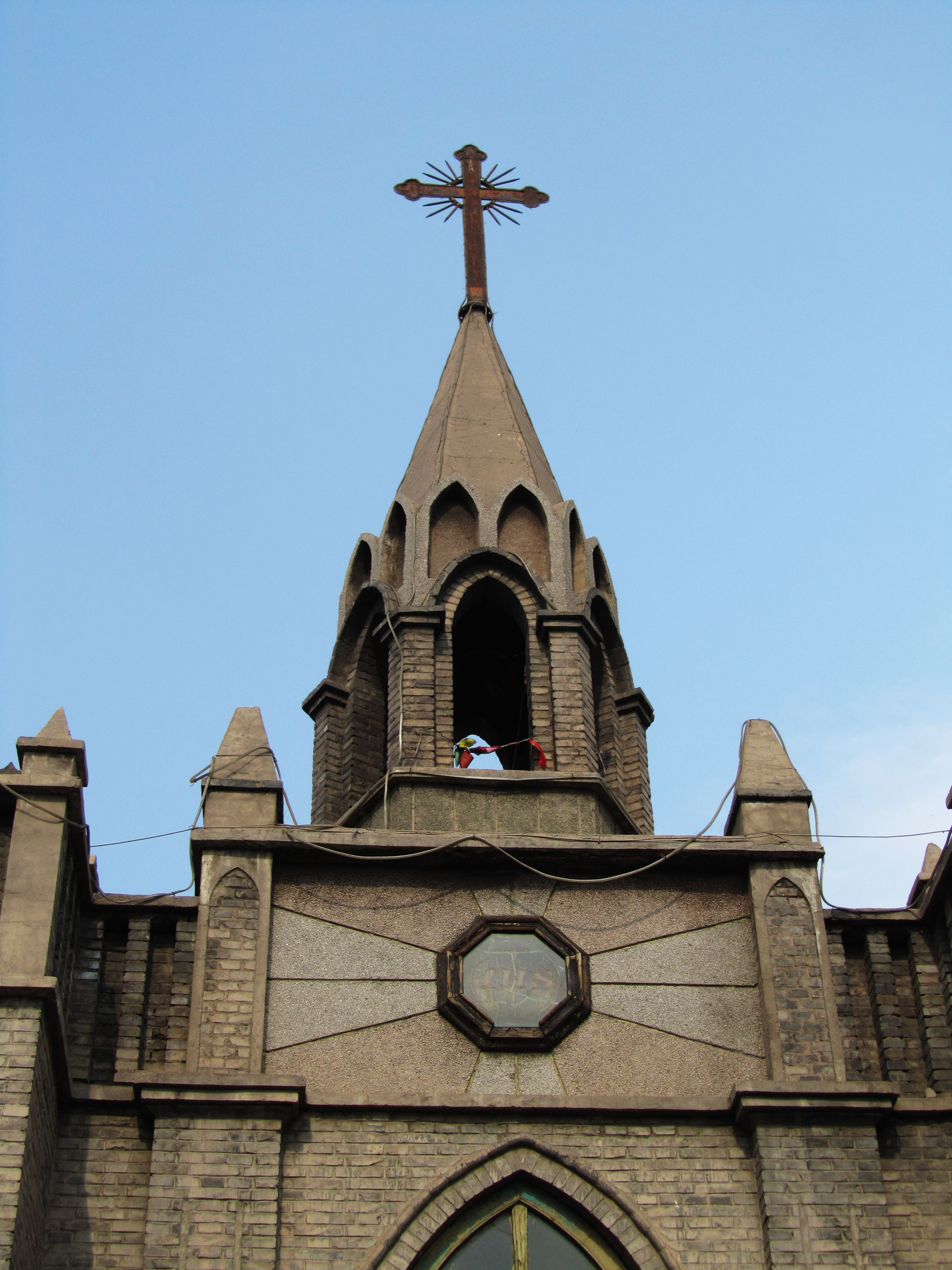
Bell tower

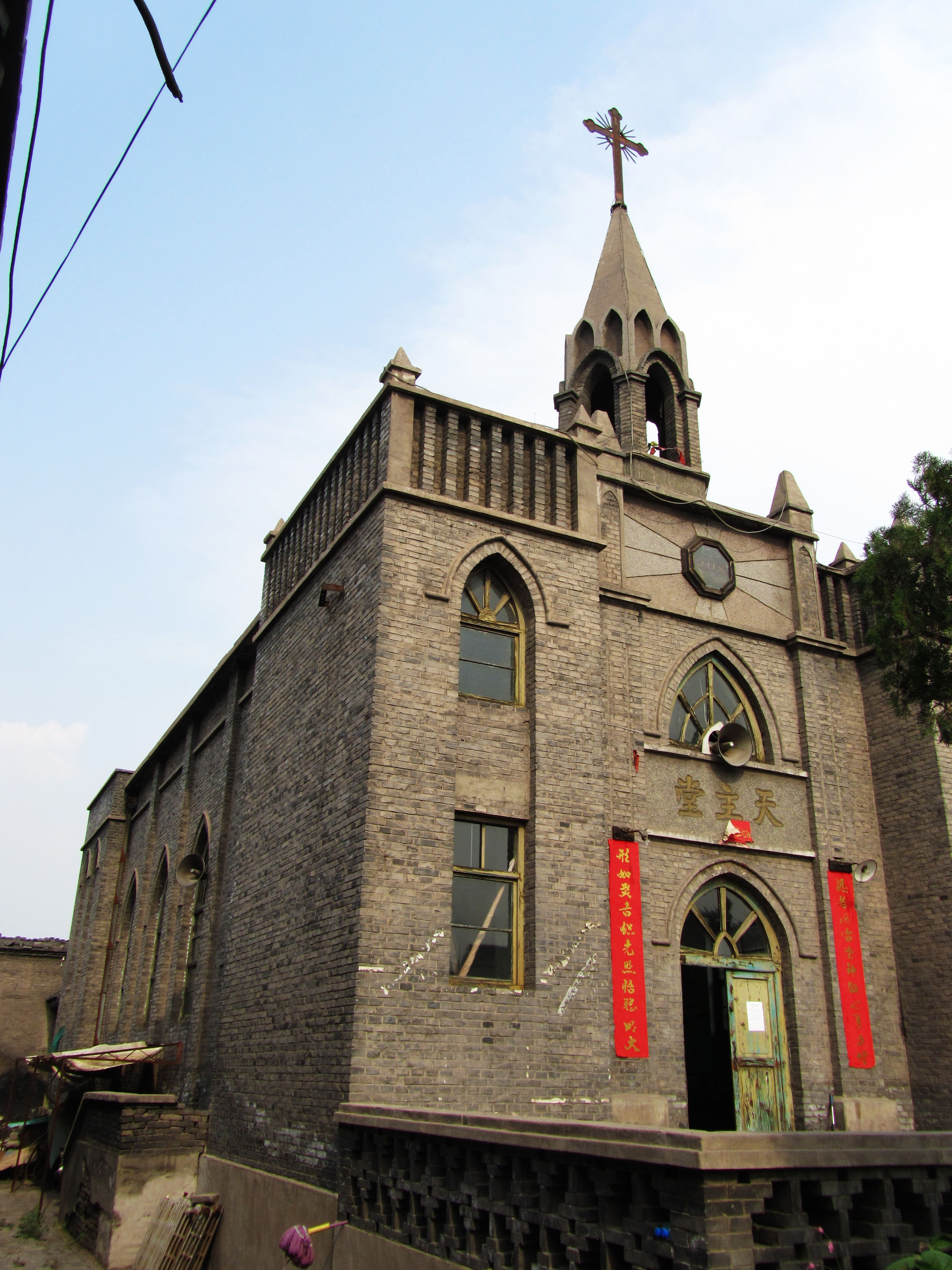
Pingyao Catholic Church
