= Battle of South Shanxi (1940) =

Battle of the Second Sino-Japanese War

- Part of the Second Sino-Japanese War
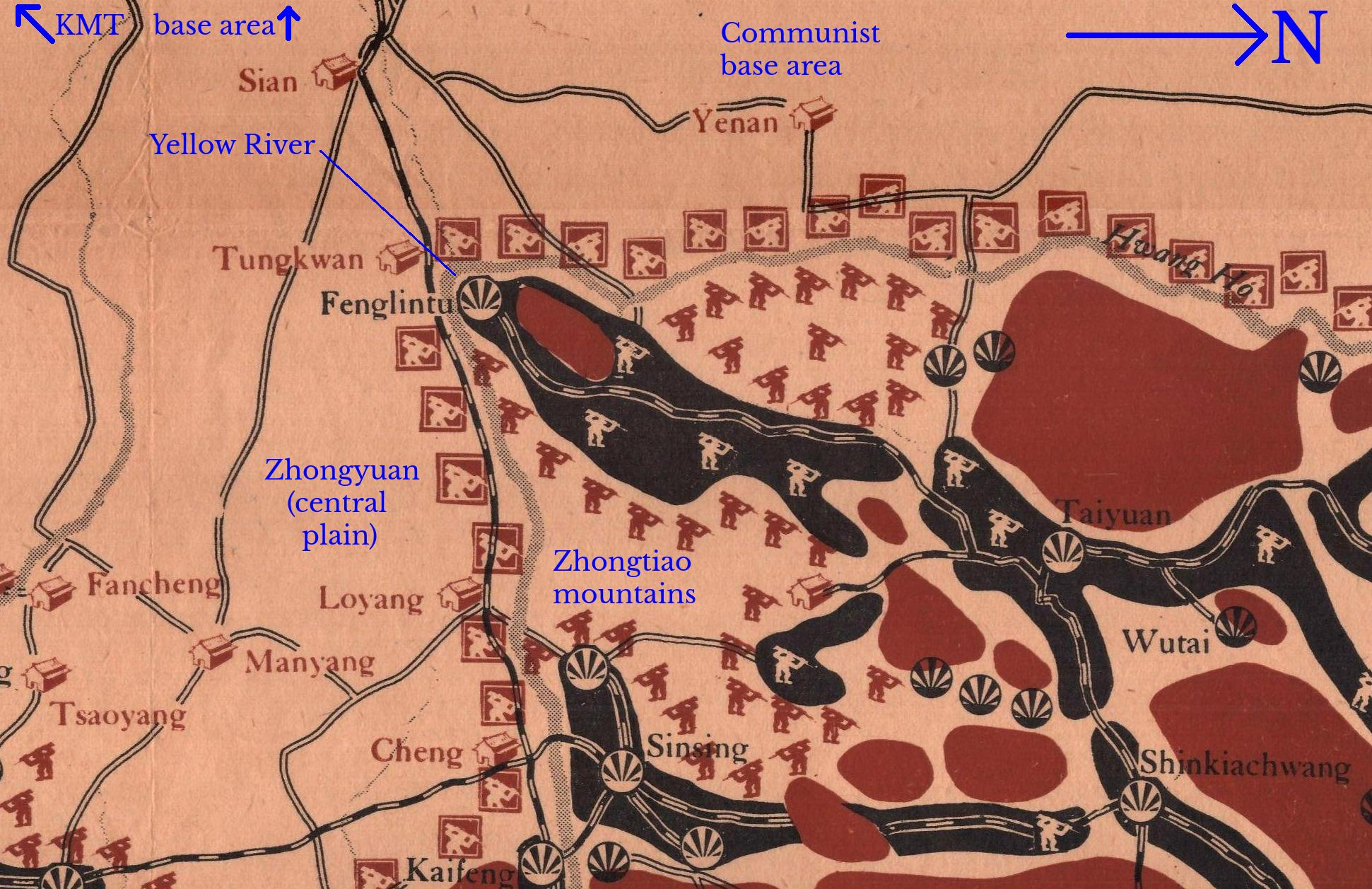
- Battle of South Shanxi Context
Date	April 17 – June 20, 1940 (2 months and 3 days)
Location	Southern part of Shanxi province in the Republic of China
Result	Japanese victory

Belligerents
(Republic of China (1912–1949)) National Revolutionary Army, China	(Empire of Japan) Japanese North China Area Army, Imperial Japanese Army, Japan

Commanders and leaders
(Republic of China (1912–1949)) Wei Lihuang (Republic of China (1912–1949)) Yan Xishan (Republic of China (1912–1949)) Hu Zongnan	(Empire of Japan) Yoshio Shinozuka

Units involved
South Shanxi Army : 4th Army Group; 5th Army Group; 14th Army Group; 36th Army Group (part); 9th Army; 27th Army; Shanxi-Suiyuan Army : 34th Army; 61st Army; 83rd Army (part); Transferred from the Tenth Military Front : 71st Army; 90th Army; 16th Army (part); 80th Army (part)	First Army : 36th Division; 37th Division; 41st Division

Strength
Japanese Claims : 120,000+	?

Casualties and losses
Chinese Claims : South Shanxi Army : heavy casualties; 90th Army of the Tenth Military Front : 20 officers and 1,838 NCOs and soldiers killed 65 officers and 426 NCOs and soldiers wounded; Shanxi-Suiyuan Army (May 1940) : 738 NCOs and soldiers killed 13 officers wounded; Japanese Claims : 27,829 killed 804 captured	Japanese Claims : 1,174 (including 76 officers) killed 3,493 (including 179 officers) wounded

The 1940 Battle of South Shanxi was an operation initiated by the Japanese First Army in North China to destroy the stronghold of the Chinese Army in southeast Shanxi. It included one of the thirteen battles in the Zhongtiao Mountains before the Battle of South Shanxi. The National Revolutionary Army referred to the battle as The Enemy's Operation to Open Up Transportation Routes between Shanxi and Henan. The Japanese Army divided the battle into three phases : Spring Operation in South Shanxi, Xiangning Operation, and Counterattack Operation in South Shanxi.

== Background ==
Despite repeated sweeping operations conducted by the Japanese North China Area Army since 1938, there were still a significant Chinese presence in the region. By the end of March 1940, the Japanese China Expeditionary Army estimated the strength of Chinese troops in North China as :

- Nationalists : approximately 380,000 regular Central Army troops, approximately 67,000 Kuomintang-affiliated guerillas, and approximately 7,000 Kuomintang-affiliated 'bandits'.
- Communists : approximately 130,000 regular Communist Army troops, approximately 110,000 Communist affiliated guerillas, and approximately 50,000 Communist-affiliated 'bandits'.
- Regular bandits : approximately 7,500 troops.

In comparison to the estimated 735,500 Chinese troops, the Japanese Army had deployed 354,160 troops to North China by mid-September 1939.

In 1939, the Japanese Army launched the East Shanxi Operation targeting the base of the Chinese First Military Front. However, while they believed that they had inflicted heavy damage on the enemy, the First Military Front had been steadily strengthening their defenses in the southeast Shanxi region which the Japanese Army believed to be the last Nationalist Chinese stronghold in North China. Among the Chinese units deployed in Shanxi, the Japanese Army believed that the fighting spirit of Chongqing's Central Army in southeastern Shanxi was superior to Zhu De's Communist Eighth Route Army in northern Shanxi and Yan Xishan's Shanxi Army in southwestern Shanxi. To maintain security in North China and expand their occupied territories, the Japanese First Army planned an offensive to destroy the Chinese Army in South Shanxi. On March 5, 1940, the 36th, 37th, and 41st Divisions were issued orders to prepare for the "Spring Operation in South Shanxi".

The Chinese Army believed that the deployment of the Japanese divisions meant they were preparing for an operation to open up transportation routes between Shanxi and Henan via the areas of Changzhi, Yangcheng, and Bo'ai to invade south Henan. Recognizing the importance of southeast Shanxi over the security of the entire province, the Military Affairs Commission of the Kuomintang approved the transfer of the elite 71st Army from Shaanxi. The 4th, 5th, 14th, and 36th Army Groups remained stationed in the areas of Yicheng, Jiang County, and the Zhongtiao Mountains and prepared for the Japanese offensive.

== Campaign ==
=== Spring Operation in South Shanxi (17 April until 8 May 1940) ===
==== Zhongtiao Mountains Front ====
On April 17, 1940, the Japanese 37th Division moved southward from Yuncheng to launch an offensive against the Shaanxi 4th Army Group at the Zhongtiao Mountains. The 227th Infantry Regiment quickly routed the New 35th Division in Zhangcun (張村) and captured Pinglu. The 225th and 226th Infantry Regiments, supported by artillery and the air force, advanced towards Monan, Pinglu, and Maojindu (茅津渡) as the Chinese units gradually retreated. On April 19, the Japanese regiments captured Yandi Village (淹底村) and went on to attack Wangyuan (望原). The training regiment of the 38th Army held onto the stronghold and was able to repel the assault after several days of fierce fighting.

On April 25, the 37th Division launched a massive assault at the Chinese 17th Division's position near Maojiashan (毛家山), inflicting heavy casualties and routing the Chinese division. At the end of the month, the 4th Army Group launched a counterattack against the 37th Division, regaining some lost ground and fighting the enemy into a stalemate which lasted for the rest of the operation. In the two weeks of combat, the 4th Army Group suffered more than 3,500 casualties and the 37th Division suffered more than 400 casualties. The "April 14" or "April 17" Campaign was second only to the "June 6" Campaign in 1939 for the 4th Army Group in the Zhongtiao Mountains in terms of scale and brutality.

==== Jincheng Front ====
On April 20, the Japanese 41st Division attacked the positions of the 93rd Army from the Fushan and Jicheng (冀城) areas. Commander-in-chief Wei Lihuang quickly ordered the 14th Army to attack the enemy from the east to assist the 93rd Army. On the same day, the 237th Infantry Regiment broke through the position of the 85th Division in Zhangma (張馬), and engaged with the 14th Army near Dongfeng Town (董封鎮) until the end of April. By April 23, the 93rd Army had suffered too many casualties after several days of bitter fighting. As the 41st Division forced a crossing at the Qin River, the 93rd Army retreated to the east bank. A section of the Japanese division also engaged in fierce fighting with the 71st Army near Puchi Village (蒲池村).

At the same time as the 41st Division, the Japanese 36th Division launched a massive attack at the 27th Army's position in Lingchuan. The Japanese division sent a detachment consisting of the 224th Infantry Regiment to attack the 27th Army from the left. Facing a serious threat from the flank and having already suffered heavy casualties, the 27th Army decided to retreat to the northeast and Lingchuan fell. Wei Lihuang immediately ordered the 178th Division of the 47th Army to block the Japanese southward advance from Lingchuan and the 71st Army to attack northeast from Gaoping to support the 27th Army. Lingchuan was recaptured through the combined actions of multiple Chinese armies on April 25. The 27th Army pursued the retreating Japanese troops and launched guerilla attacks.

The Tawara detachment of the Japanese 36th Division advanced to the Duzhai Village (杜寨村) on April 23 and surrounded the supplementary regiment of the Chinese 36th Division. The Chinese regiment barely managed to break out after desperate fighting, though with its commander killed and its combat strength exhausted. The Japanese 36th Division then went on to capture Gaoping on April 24 and Jincheng the next day.

On April 27, the 36th Division sent a detachment from Jincheng to attack Gaoping Pass. Simultaneously, the 41st Division pressed its attack on the 93rd Army on the east bank of the Qin River and the 71st Army near Puchi Village. At dawn on April 30, the Japanese Army launched a brutal assault at the Gaoping Pass and wiped out the 263rd Regiment of the 88th Division. At the same time, the 93rd Army was under immense pressure from the 41st Division and abandoned its position, exposing the right flank of the 71st Army. Facing increasing number of Japanese troops, the 71st Army suffered heavy casualties and retreated to the mountainous areas northwest of Gaoping Pass on May 1, ending the first phase of the operation.

During the operation, the Japanese Army witnessed a noteworthy occurrence happening on the battlefield. Before the Japanese offensive, Chinese Communist forces in the southern Lu'an (潞安) area had withdrawn to northern Lu'an and ceded its base to the elite Chongqing-affiliated forces that advanced into the area. After the Chongqing forces were driven back by the fierce Japanese attack, the Communist troops which had stayed in the rear took the opportunity to advance to the Qin River area. Major Shigemoto Kobayashi, chief intelligence staff officer of the 36th Division, recalled that when the division was pursuing defeated Nationalist forces on its right wing, Communist forces were advancing in parallel with the Japanese unit while pressing closely upon the retreating Chongqing troops. Since Communist organizations had already infiltrated the upper reaches of the Qin River, they quickly moved into the area to expand their sphere of influence. The Japanese major believed this was one of the tactics used by the Communist Army, to let elite forces fight each other and reap the benefits.

=== Xiangning Operation (10 May until 20 May 1940) ===
To support Chinese troops at the Zhongtiao Mountains and restore the triangle defense area, Hu Zongnan, the commander of the 34th Army Group, ordered the 90th Army from Shaanxi to harass various Japanese strongholds at southwest Shanxi. The 109th Division started its attack on April 26 and clashed with Japanese troops at Hejin, Xinjiang, and Jishan, at one point breaking through Japanese defense in Jishan. The 61st Division attacked Houma and the 53rd Division laid siege to Fencheng (汾城) The western advance attracted the First Army's attention and the Japanese commander quickly redirected the 37th and 41st Divisions to launch the "Xiangning Operation", with the aim of destroying Hu Zongnan's Central Army troops. The Japanese Army started the offensive on May 10, and the two divisions pressed the attack on the 90th Army while steadily advancing to the outskirts of Xiangning. Parts of the divisions also engaged with the 34th, 61st, and 83rd Armies at the Lüliang Mountains. Hu Zongnan's and Yan Xishan's troops committed to guerilla warfare and avoided direct frontal combat with the advancing Japanese troops. Xiangning was captured by the Japanese Army on May 15. The Japanese believed that they had inflicted a heavy blow on the 90th Army. Judging that their objective had been achieved and considering the urgent situation in south Shanxi, the Japanese Army ordered an end to the operation on May 17. The two Japanese division conducted mopping-up operations and returned to the Fen River area on May 20.

=== Counterattack Operation in South Shanxi (15 May until 20 June 1940) ===
As the pressure on southeast Shanxi eased, commander-in-chief Wei Lihuang took the opportunity to order his First Military Front to launch counterattacks to recover lost territories, with the offensive centered in southeast Shanxi. The Japanese Army believed that Chinese forces in south Shanxi had suffered a devastating blow in the previous South Shanxi operation and did not expect the sudden Chinese offensive. Since the 37th and 41st Divisions were still fighting at the Xiangning Front, the South Shanxi Front was defended by only the 36th Division. The Japanese First Army quickly ordered the other two divisions to return and counterattack the attacking Chinese troops.

On May 15, the 14th Army attacked Yangcheng and engaged Japanese troops in the southwestern suburbs. On May 20, the 27th and 71st Armies cooperated to surround Japanese soldiers of the 36th Division in Jincheng. The two armies launched numerous attacks on the city but were unable to achieve any success due to the enemy's strong defensive positions and heavy artillery support. On May 27, the 93rd Army captured Xianwengshan (仙翁山), drawing away a detachment from the 41st Division.

In south Shanxi, the 4th Army Group remained engaged in battles with the 37th Division along the Baishuling (柏樹嶺) and Huangcaopo (黃草坡) lines. The 5th Army Group was also in confrontation with a part of the Japanese division at Xia County. To support the Chinese counteroffensive in the east, the 15th Army launched a series of attacks at Jiang County starting on May 11, but was ordered to stop on May 23 after the 15th Army claimed that the Japanese had used poison gas which resulted in very many losses among the troops.

On June 7, three weeks after the start of the counteroffensive, Wei Lihuang ordered a halt for the attack on Jincheng and withdrew for reorganization to preserve combat strength. The 27th Army retreated on June 9 and, after running out of supplies from numerous fierce battles, the 71st Army retreated on June 21.

== Aftermath ==
Losses of the Japanese First Army in the operation were quite heavy and the period from April until June was the bloodiest for the Japanese Army in North China in 1940. However, the Japanese Army inflicted massive casualties on the Chinese Army and successively captured Yangcheng, Gaoping, Jincheng, and other counties in south Shanxi. In August 1940, after the Eighth Route Army launched the Hundred Regiments Offensive, the First Military Front also planned its own supporting operation. Starting from mid-September, the 9th and 93rd Armies launched diversionary attacks at Gaoping, Changzhi, Yangcheng, Qinyang, and Bo'ai and prevented Japanese reinforcements from reaching Jincheng. The 27th Army was tasked with the most important objective, taking Jincheng. Despite breaking into the city, the 27th Army could not dislodge the defenders and suffered heavy casualties. By the end of September, the First Military Front ordered an end to the offensive. In 1941, the South Shanxi Army was prepared to launch a spring offensive to retake territories lost in the previous Japanese offensive such as Gaoping, Jincheng, Yangcheng, and Qinshui and restore the south Shanxi defense area to before April 1940. However, before the Chinese offensive could begin, the Japanese Army deployed 6 divisions, 2 independent mixed brigades, and 1 cavalry brigade to destroy the Chinese stronghold in the Zhongtiao Mountains and improve security in North China in May 1941, starting the Battle of South Shanxi.
