= East Shanxi Operation =

Battle of the Second Sino-Japanese War

- Part of the Second Sino-Japanese War
- Japanese troops crossing a ford - June 1939, China
Date	July 3 – August 25, 1939 (1 month, 3 weeks and 1 day)
Location	Southeast part of Shanxi province and the borders of Hebei province and Henan province, China
Result	Japanese victory

Belligerents
(Republic of China (1912–1949)) National Revolutionary Army, China	(Empire of Japan) Imperial Japanese Army, Japan

Commanders and leaders
(Republic of China (1912–1949)) Wei Lihuang (Republic of China (1912–1949)) Pang Bingxun (Republic of China (1912–1949)) Zhu De	(Empire of Japan) Yoshijirō Umezu

Units involved
Second Military Front : South Route Army; East Route Army (Eighth Route Army); First Military Front : Northern Henan Army Corps	Japanese North China Area Army : Four divisions and one independent mixed brigade from the First Army; Two divisions directly subordinated under the area army

Strength
Japanese Claim : Approximately 165,000 troops Approximately 100,000 troops	Chinese Claim : 50,000+ troops

Casualties and losses
Nationalist losses : ? Shanxi Youth Anti-Japanese Dare-to-Die Corps : 1st Column : 300+ killed, wounded, or missing; 4th Regiment of the 2nd Column : ?; Eighth Route Army : 129th division and guerilla detachment of the Shanxi-Chahar-Hebei Border Region from July 1 to July 11 : 1,500+ casualties; Japanese Claim : heavy	?

The East Shanxi Operation, also known as the Operation No. 1 for the North China Area Army, was a large-scale Japanese mopping-up operation against Chinese guerilla troops in southeast Shanxi in the summer of 1939. The operation involved the largest number of units from the North China Area Army in 1939, with a total of six divisions and one independent mixed brigade. The National Revolutionary Army referred to the operation as the The Summer Offensive in Shanxi Province in 1939 which lasted until the end of the Chinese counterattack of Changzhi in September. The Eighth Route Army referred to the operation as the Anti-"Mopping-Up" Campaign in the Taihang Mountains Region.

== Background ==
=== Japanese view ===
In April 1938, the 14th Division was detached from the First Army to participate in the battle of Xuzhou and the 108th Division, which was responsible for guarding the Lu'an (潞安) area, was relocated to the Datong–Puzhou line. As a result, the southeast Shanxi area, especially at Lu'an, became an active base for approximately 80,000 Central Army troops under Wei Lihuang and Pang Bingxun and approximately 20,000 Communist Army troops under Zhu De to disrupt the Datong-Puzhou and Beiping-Hankou railway lines. In April 1939, the 36th and 37th Divisions came under the command of the First Army and took over the defense duties of the 109th and 20th Divisions respectively, completing the transitions by June. With the two divisions now freed up, the North China Area Army planned to carry out a purge in the southeast Shanxi region as part of the second phase of the three-phase 1939 purge operational plan in North China.

The operation divided the operation into two fronts. The northern front involved approximately three infantry battalions from the 108th Division, five infantry battalions from the 109th Division, and one infantry battalion from the 36th Division. At the southern front, the 20th Division was initially supposed to deploy three infantry battalions into the operation. However, most of the division ended up participating early in the operation. Additionally, approximately one and a half battalion from the 108th Division and approximately one infantry battalion from the 36th Division was added to the front on July 10. In all, the northern front was divided into three phases involving approximately twelve infantry battalions and five artillery battalions and the southern front was divided into two phases involving nine infantry battalions and four artillery battalions. To support the First Army, the North China Area Army deployed the 10th and 35th Divisions to the frontline. For this operation, the First Army temporarily formed the Taniguchi Unit (composed of four infantry battalions, two mountain artillery companies, and one engineer company from the 109th Division) and put them under the command of the 10th Division to serve as the core unit for this division's mission of securing the Wu'an-She County-Lu'an line. In addition, the 10th Division deployed one and a half infantry battalions and one mountain artillery company from its own troops. The 35th Division, with five infantry battalions, six field artillery companies, and one mountain artillery battalion, was tasked with advancing towards Jincheng.

=== Chinese view ===
Since the battle of Xuzhou, the Chinese and Japanese armies in Shanxi had engaged in many guerilla and mopping-up operations in the south and north. In April 1939, the First, Second, Fifth, Tenth, Shandong-Jiangsu, and Hebei-Chahar Military Fronts launched a massive offensive to support the Ninth Military Front in the battle of Nanchang. The Second Military Front began its large-scale April Offensive with the South, East, West, and North Route Armies on April 10. However, the build-up of the Chinese Army in Shanxi had attracted the attention of the Japanese First Army, which sent the 20th and 108th Divisions to launch pre-emptive mopping-up operations which disrupted the Chinese attack. The losses of the First Army in the offensive were still considerable, with 177 killed and 734 wounded in the first two weeks of combat.

In June 1939, the Japanese First Army launched several large-scale mopping-up operations in what the Chinese National Revolutionary Army considered as the Battle of West Shanxi and South Shanxi. In the South Shanxi Front, the Japanese First Army gathered more than 30,000 troops from the 20th and 37th Divisions to mop-up Wei Lihuang's South Route Army, sweeping the 4th Group Army and the 47th Army in the Zhongtiao Mountains in early June and the 5th Group Army and the 9th Army at Jiang County and Yuanqu in late June. In the West Shanxi Front, the Japanese 109th Division swept the 19th Army of Yan Xishan's Shanxi-Suiyuan Army at the Liulin area in early June. These operations succeeded in inflicting heavy casualties on the Chinese Army in Shanxi at a cost of 339 killed and 1,029 wounded for Yoshijirō Umezu's First Army.

In late June 1939 after the battle of the Zhongtiao Mountains, the Military Affairs Commission of the Nationalist government prepared for a summer offensive in mid-July to secure the anti-Japanese base areas in Shanxi Province and support guerrilla operations in the Hebei-Chahar and Shandong-Jiangsu Military Fronts to facilitate future offensive operations. The plan as outlined was to use approximately one-third of the forces of the Hebei-Chahar, Shandong-Jiangsu, and Second Military Fronts to launch localized offensives while reinforcing the remaining troops. On July 2, the Second Military Front received the Military Commission's telegraph and formulated its deployment plan with the 4th, 5th, and 14th Group Armies of Wei Lihuang's South Route Army, Eighth Route Army of Zhu De's East Route Army, and various units of the West Route Army, North Route Army, and Shanxi-Shaanxi-Suiyuan Border Region Army. Preparations were supposed to be completed by July 9, however, the Japanese Army had launched its own offensive in southeast Shanxi before the summer offensive began with more than 50,000 troops from five routes.

In March 1939, the 39th Division of the 40th Army crossed the Yellow River in Mianchi County, Henan, and proceeded towards the vicinity of Jincheng at the border of Henan and Shanxi provinces. In mid-May 1939, the 45th Division, 46th Division, and 8th Reserve Division of the 27th Army crossed the river at Mianchi Port to enter Shanxi. In the summer of 1939, the 27th Army entered the Taihang Mountains in southeast Shanxi along with Pang Bingxun's 40th Army and Zhu Huabing's 97th Army. At the time of the Japanese offensive, Pang Bingxun's 40th Army of the First Military Front had crossed the Yellow River to the north and advanced to the western section of the Daokou-Qinghua Railway and Sun Dianying's New Fifth Army had advanced from the northern section of the Beiping–Hankou Railway to the south of Wu'an to support the Second Military Front. The 65th Division of the 15th Army of the 5th Group Army cooperated with the 14th Group Army in combat.

Changping Village (常平村) was located in the southern part of the Taihang Mountains and was garrisoned by the 115th Brigade of the 39th Division which held the Yaotou (窑头), Laomaling (老马岭), and Changping areas of Qinyang. To protect the Taihang Military Region, the Eighth Route Army sent Tian Shifeng (田时风), secretary of the underground Communist committee and head of the 7th district of Qinyang, to lead his troops to block the Japanese Army at the southern Taihang Mountains and coordinate with the 115th Brigade under the command of Huang Shuxun (黄树勋). At the same time, the headquarters of the 40th Army dispatched the 117th Brigade of the 39th Division and the army's special forces battalion to the Xiaokou (小口) and Dakou (大口) areas bordering Jincheng and Qinghua to prevent the Japanese 35th Division from opening up the Jincheng-Bo'ai Highway and linking up with the 20th Division.

== Battle process ==
=== Northern front ===
==== First phase ====
The First Army ended up investing slightly more troops than originally planned, namely approximately two and a half infantry battalions from the 108th Division which advanced from Yicheng and Fushan to the vicinity of Mabi Village (馬壁村) and approximately one infantry battalion from the 36th Division which advanced from Fancun Town (范村鎮), Taigu to the vicinity of Yushe. On July 3, a portion of the 4th Independent Mixed Brigade (consisting of approximately one and a half infantry battalions and one platoon of a mountain artillery company) began its operation, occupying Liao County on July 4 and engaging in battles with the 385th Brigade of the 129th Division of the Eighth Route Army. The 109th Division captured Wuxiang and Qin County without encountering significant enemy resistance on July 5. On July 6, the 385th Brigade recaptured Liao County. On July 7, the 109th Division fought with the Independent Regiment of the 386th Brigade of the 129th Division near Yushe, resulting in the death of regiment commander Ding Silin. On July 8, the 4th Independent Mixed Brigade, with cooperation from the 36th and 109th Divisions, occupied Yushe. Taking into consideration the rising water level of the Qin River, the Yano Task Force of the 108th Division sent a portion of its force ahead to occupy the crossing point at Fucheng Town (府城鎮) on July 3 while the main force of the task force departed near Anze on July 5, occupying Fucheng Town, Liangma Town (良馬鎮), Qinyuan, and Zhangdian Town (張店鎮) by July 9.

==== Second phase ====
On July 11, the 108th and 109th Divisions resumed their attack, capturing Tunliu and Xiangyuan on the same day. As the Japanese divisions advanced, the 129th Division took the opportunity to recover Yushe and Wuxiang. On July 12, Xiangyuan was also recovered. The 109th Division occupied Lu'an on July 13 and the 108th Division occupied Changzi the next day. Considering the heavy rain that made it difficult to link up with the 20th Division and the weak enemy resistance on the northern front, the First Army planned to eliminate the enemy near Jincheng. On July 15, the army headquarters ordered the 108th and 109th Divisions to conduct the third phase of the operation, with the 109th Division advancing towards Gaoping and the 108th Division providing support.

=== Southern front ===
The 20th Division began attacking heavily fortified enemy positions east of Jiang County on July 5, deploying three of its infantry regiments to attack the 83rd Division of the 14th Army at Zhangma Village (張馬村) west of Qinshui and the 65th Division of the 15th Army east of Henglingguan (橫嶺關). Meanwhile, the 93rd Army was deployed north of Qinshui in an attempt to outflank the 20th Division. At the 78th Infantry Regiment's front, the 2nd Battalion was engaged with a regiment of the 83rd Division at Hill 1496 near Diaoshangou (吊山溝). The 3rd Battalion encountered great difficulties facing a regiment of the 65th Division near Caojiashan (曹家山), especially against the 2nd Battalion of the Yang Regiment which continued resisting from Hill 1386 and engaging in hand-to-hand combat with the Japanese troops after its position had all been destroyed by fierce artillery fire. At 19:00, the 2nd Battalion was forced to retreat to Hill 1700 due to heavy casualties and the Japanese battalion occupied Hill 1386 at 20:40, the fierce close combat having cost the battalion approximately 30 troops killed or wounded including Lieutenant Baba.

The 3rd Battalion of the 78th Infantry Regiment was given no reprieve on July 6, as the enemy concentrated fire at Hill 1386 with artillery and mortars from Miaojiashan (苗家山) and Caojiashan at 01:40. At around 02:00, the Chinese launched a night assault with several hundred troops from the 1st Battalion of the Yang Regiment of the 65th Division advancing under the covering fire of machine guns. The Japanese battalion commander led half of his troops to engage the counterattacking Chinese troops in hand-to-hand combat. During the battle, battalion commander Major Yamashita was badly wounded and acting machine gun company commander Captain Mizuno was also wounded. Many other officers and soldiers were also killed or wounded. Ultimately, the Chinese battalion abandoned its attempt to occupy and hold the high ground, instead withdrawing to Hill 1700 and Caojiashan while under the pursuit of a portion of the 3rd Battalion. By the morning of July 6, the 78th Infantry Regiment had suffered 31 killed and 164 wounded. Among those killed in action was Lieutenant Baba and those wounded in action included battalion commander Major Yamashita, Captain Mizuno, 7 lieutenants, and 1 warrant officer. On the evening of July 6, portions of the 65th Division remained engaged with the Japanese 3rd Battalion at Caojiashan and Guojiazhuang (郭家莊).

On July 7, the 83rd Division continued engaging Japanese forces at Zhangma and Zhongcun (中村). Two regiments of the 65th Division at Caojiashan and Hill 1700 and one regiment of the 64th Division at Fengjiahe (馮家河) engaged in fierce fighting at Guojia (郭家), Liujia (劉家), Hill 1496, and Diaoshangou. By the end of July 7 in three days of fighting, the 65th Division and attached units from the 64th Division had suffered 120 killed, 158 wounded, and 40 missing while claiming more than 200 Japanese troops killed or wounded. On July 8, the 78th Infantry Regiment launched another assault on the positions of the 15th Army. Portions of the 64th Division temporarily assigned to the 65th Division were driven out of Fengjiahe and Xi Village (席村) and retreated to the high ground south of Tanyuanhe (炭源河) to connect with friendly forces. In the battle that day, the 65th Division and attached units from the 64th Division suffered 90 killed, 31 wounded, and 6 missing.

After fierce fighting, the 20th Division occupied Qinshui on July 8. However, rain made it difficult for the vehicles to advance, resulting in a temporary halt to the division's advance. Meanwhile, except for the 65th Division which remained in position to hold the line, the main force of the 93rd Army withdrew to Duanshi Town (端氏鎮) while the 14th Army moved to the south of Dongfeng Town (董封鎮) and Zhongcun Town. The main force of the 20th Division resumed operations from Zhongcun and Qinshui from July 13 to July 15. On July 19, the 40th Brigade crossed Qinshui near Yangcheng and Ruishi Town (端氏鎮), advancing towards Jincheng on July 20 and Gaoping on July 21. The 39th Brigade encountered more stubborn resistance from the 14th Army at Dongfeng Town west of Yangcheng on July 17. At the same time, the 93rd Army was launching offensives from various routes. On July 21, the 14th Army and 93rd Army attacked Japanese forces southwest of Yangcheng. After multiple battles, the 39th Brigade crossed Qinshui under the pursuit of the two Chinese armies on July 25 and reached Jincheng on July 27. On July 25, the 93rd Army recovered Yangcheng and its 10th and 166th Divisions advanced towards Qinshui while the 83rd Division advanced towards Jincheng. On July 26, the Chinese 10th Division recovered Qinshui.

=== Jincheng-Jiaozuo front ===
The 35th Division departed near Qinghua Town on July 5 and advanced while encountering stubborn resistance from the 40th Army. Approximately one infantry battalion from the 14th Division was assigned to the 35th Division during the battle. On July 7, a portion of the 35th Division launched successive assaults against the 16-troop garrison at Jianshan (尖山), completely wiping them out by the end of the day. The next day, the Japanese began their assaults on the 234th Regiment's position at Dakou and Xiaokou. After several days of bitter fighting with heavy casualties on both sides, the Japanese shifted their force to attack the left flank of the Chinese garrison at Dakou, engaging in combat with the 233rd Regiment defending Youfangtou Village (油房头村). Battalion commander Zhang Shiying (张士英) led his troops from the front to hold their position despite repeated assault, but was killed in action in the process.

After achieving no progress at Dakou, the Japanese focused their attacks on the 234th Regiment's position at Xiaokou, bypassing Yaotou and engaging the special forces battalion at Guanye Peak (关爷顶). Under the relentless bombardments from artillery and mortar shells, the battalion continued fighting until only a platoon was left to defend the peak. A Japanese detachment bypassed Xiaokou and Dakou to attack the rear of the third defense line at Heishiling (黑石岭), cutting off the battalion's rear. With no way out, most of the remnants fought to the end. The 7 remaining troops hid outside Heishiling Village before breaking out to reach friendly lines. Immediately after the fall of Guanye Peak, regimental commander Sun Bingkun (孙秉琨) of the 234th Regiment organized five infantry companies into an assault force to regain lost ground. However, units were committed piecemeal due to improper judgement, and as a result the Chinese force suffered a severe setback at the hands of the opposing Japanese troops, with casualties approaching 300. On July 15, Xiaokou fell. With no reserve to spare, the regimental headquarters ordered its signals platoon to reinforce the front but it was intercepted on the way and was only saved by a hastily organized relief force from the 2nd Battalion. After more than a week of fighting at Dakou and Xiaokou, the 234th Regiment had suffered too many casualties and retreated to Tianjing Pass (天井關) on the night of July 17.

On July 8, another portion of the 35th Division launched a fierce assault against the 229th Regiment around Changping. The Chinese company defending Huangsha Ridge (黄沙岭), the forward position of Yaotou, was completely wiped out. Yaotou fell soon after, and the 115th Brigade's chief of staff was killed in action. Laomaling in the east also fell at the same time and the remaining defenders of the two positions retreated to Changping, where they fought against Japanese troops in extremely brutal street battles in close combat which resulted in the death of the deputy brigade commander. After suffering 515 casualties, commander Si Yuankai (司元愷) led the remaining troops of the 229th Regiment to withdraw from Changping Village. After occupying the village, the Japanese launched a fierce assault at Mengliangzhai (孟良寨), a strategic fortress on the border of Henan and Shanxi provinces. After running out of ammunition and suffering heavy casualties in a day and night of bloody fighting, the Chinese defenders abandoned their positions and Mengliangzhai fell.

On July 17, the North China Area Army ordered the 35th Division to cooperate with the First Army's plan to eliminate the enemy and, if necessary, ordered a portion of its force to advance towards Zhoucun (周村) to assist the First Army's advance to the left bank of the Qin River. The 35th Division continued its advance and captured Jincheng on July 19. On July 21, the 35th Division was ordered to hand over the Jincheng area to the 20th Division and withdrew on July 24, reaching its original garrison area on August 20.

In the East Shanxi Operation, the Japanese 35th Division suffered 183 killed and 532 wounded. Army commander Pang Bingxun reported to Chiang Kai-Shek that in the battles of Yaotou, Dongping, Guanye Temple, Wancheng, Dakou, Xiaokou, and Tianjing Pass from July 6 to July 17, the 39th Division suffered 18 officers and 615 NCOs and soldiers killed, 65 officers and 1,931 NCOs and soldiers wounded, and 48 missing, for a total of 2,677 officers and soldiers killed, wounded, or missing. The neighboring 106th Division also suffered hundreds of casualties. According to the recollection of the commander of the signals platoon of the 117th Brigade, the 39th Division and the 40th Army's special forces battalion suffered more than 2,300 casualties defending the Jincheng-Bo'ai Highway. According to the statistics of the Chinese Ministry of Military Affairs, 607 soldiers from the 39th Division, 102 soldiers from the 106th Division, and 22 soldiers from units directly subordinated under the 40th Army were killed in action in July 1939.

=== Mopping-up operations around Jincheng ===
On July 17, the 108th and 109th Divisions began the third phase of their operation, advancing towards Jincheng to link up with the 20th Division. They captured Gaoping on July 18 and advanced into Jincheng on July 20. The First Army decided to stationed its main units in Jincheng to carry out sweeps at the southeast Shanxi region—the 20th Division at Jincheng and Gaoping, the 109th Division at Lu'an and Qin County, and the 108th Division near Qin County and the right bank of the Qin River. From August 7 to August 13, the 108th, 36th, and 109th conducted sweeps against Communist and Nationalist troops near Qin County in the Taiyue (太岳) region, dealing a heavy blow on the 42nd and 169th Divisions of the Shaanxi 98th Army and the 3rd Regiment of the 1st Column of the Shanxi Youth Anti-Japanese Dare-to-Die Corps. From August 10 to August 13, the 20th Division mopped-up the 85th Division of the 14th Army northwest of Jincheng, inflicting heavy casualties and nearly overrunning the divisional headquarters. To support the 85th Division, the 39th Division dispatched battalion-sized units to continuously attack Japanese troops and vehicles of the 20th Division outside Jincheng and Changzhi.

On August 10, the First Army ordered the 20th Division to gradually depart from the Jincheng area and advance towards the Lu'an and Qin County areas between August 16 and August 18. Taking advantage of the relocation of the Japanese unit, the Chinese Army launched a counteroffensive to retake Jincheng. The 85th Division of the 14th Army from Qinshui and a detachment of the Eighth Route Army surrounded the city. To cut off the withdrawal of Mitsune Ushijima's 20th Division from Jincheng to the strategic stronghold of Changzhi, army commander Pang Bingxun ordered the 117th Brigade of the 39th Division attached with the 14th Cavalry Brigade to attack the Japanese north of Jincheng while the 115th Brigade attacked the city. However, the 234th Regiment of the 117th Brigade could not catch up with the Japanese rearguard at Beishidian Village (北石店村) and the 14th Cavalry Brigade failed to overtake them at Bagong (巴公). As a result, the Chinese cavalry was only able to capture a straggling sergeant major of the 20th Division at Bagong Town who had been unaware of his unit's withdrawal to the north. At the same time, the 115th Brigade recovered Jincheng on August 21. On August 23, the 14th Cavalry Brigade of the 40th Army and the 8th Reserve Division of the 27th Army recaptured Gaoping. By late August, more than half of the more than 20 counties captured in the operation had gone back to Chinese hands.

=== Handan-Lu’an Front ===
The Tanaguchi unit under the 10th Division departed near Wu'an on July 5 and occupied She County on July 8. Heavy rain that night washed away the bridges and made further advance impossible, causing a temporary halt until the weather improved. A portion of the 10th Division occupied Gucheng (古城) on July 16 and Lin County on July 19, confronting Sun Dianying's troops at the outskirts of the county. The Tanaguchi unit departed from She County on August 7, advanced towards Licheng on August 8, and finally succeeded in opening the Handan-Lu'an road on August 21. Throughout the operation, the 129th Division launched several attacks on the 10th Division at She County.

=== Allegations of poison gas ===
Many Chinese units claimed the Japanese using a large amount of poison gas during the course of the operation. At around 11:00 on July 5, the Li regiment of the 65th Division suffered more than 10 gas casualties as a result of the Japanese firing poison gas shells on their position. The 169th Division claimed that the Japanese force facing them fired gas shells at their position north of Baihuyao (白狐窑) near the start of the operation, causing yellow smoke to billow across the battlefield though without causing any losses. The Chinese Army claimed that the Japanese Army fired more than 2,000 shells including poison gas shells at the 83rd Division on the afternoon of July 7, destroying all of its positions. They also claimed the Japanese releasing poison gas on the 14th Army and 93rd Army during the attack southwest of Yangcheng on July 20.

On July 19, Chen Tie, commander of the 14th Army, reported Japanese forces releasing blistering poison gas on the 85th Division when the attacks near Dongfeng were the most intense in the past two days, with victims observed to have large blisters all over their bodies. This report was echoed by Zuo Quan who highlighted the effect of blistering gas on many soldiers of the 85th Division in the battle of Dongfeng west of Yangcheng in his telegraph to all units of the Eighth Route Army on August 5, 1939. Two days later on August 7, Zhu De, Peng Dehuai, and Zuo Quan telegraphed that based on Chiang Kai-Shek's telegraph, the Imperial General Headquarters instructed the Japanese Army in China to use poison gas as much as possible in future operations on July 18 and all troops of the Eighth Route Army should prepare for anti-gas measures. According to Xinhua Daily on August 20, 1939, the Japanese Army counterattacked the Chinese troops assaulting Jincheng on August 14 with intense artillery fire and poison gas.

The 39th Division also reported the large-scale usage of poison gas during the defense of Changping and the Jincheng-Bo'ai Highway. During the battle of Changping on July 8, many soldiers of the 229th Regiment of the 115th Brigade suffocated to death due to the Japanese's use of poison gas. (Note: 400 according to the "Well-Known City Along the Yellow River: Jiaozuo" book, at least an entire platoon according to Pang Bingxun's telegraph) The special forces battalion of the 40th Army also claimed that the Japanese resorted to using poison gas after facing heavy resistance at the Guanye Peak, which did not have an effect as the battalion was equipped with gas masks. On July 15, under the cover of the fog, the Japanese Army released a large amount of poison gas at Xiaokou Village. The 234th Regiment of the 117th Brigade lacked gas masks and all of its positions collapsed, resulting in the regimental headquarters having to order the signals platoon to the front. On the night of July 16, the Japanese released a large amount of poison gas on the 234th Regiment and took the opportunity to seize the Heishiling position. Divisional commander Liu Shirong (劉世榮) claimed that in ten days of fighting, the opposing Japanese forces fired two to three thousand shells, most of which were poison gas shells. In addition, gas projectors were used to release a large amount of poison gas dozens of times on the 39th Division, resulting in very heavy casualties.

Based on the statistics of various anti-gas personnel and units, the Ministry of Military Affairs of the Kuomintang recorded the Japanese Army using poison gas against the National Revolutionary Army 455 times in 1939. Of the nine military fronts of the NRA which recorded the Japanese's use of poison gas that year, the Second Military Front in Shanxi suffered 117 poison gas attacks, second only to the Ninth Military Front which was hit with 151 poison gas attacks. Poison gas usage also happened in many other battlefields of the Second Military Front, with Sun Weiru, commander of the 4th Group Army, reporting as many as 1,000 poison gas victims among the troops of the 38th and 96th Armies during the battle of the Zhongtiao Mountains in June 1939.

== Aftermath ==
At the end of August just after the operation ended, the Japanese Army were already detecting the gathering of six enemy divisions around the Lu’an area. On August 28, deputy commander-in-chief Wei Lihuang had ordered the various units in southeast Shanxi to launch an offensive to retake Changzhi. At the start of September, the 42nd and 169th Divisions of the 98th Army attacked Baodian Town (鮑店鎮) and Tunliu, the 39th Division and 14th Cavalry Brigade of the 40th Army engaged the Japanese around Huguan with the 344th Brigade of the 115th Division of the Eighth Route Army providing support, and the 45th, 46th, and 8th Reserve Divisions of the 27th Army launched repeated attacks on Changzhi and Changzi. The Japanese First Army launched several counterattacks and inflicted heavy casualties on the 27th Army in two weeks of fighting. On September 12, the Japanese Army released a large amount of poison gas on the 39th Division attacking Huguan, resulting in the poisoning of five squads of soldiers and forcing the 39th Division to cease its operations and retreat south. Despite having inflicted considerable losses on the enemy, the Japanese Army believed that the Chinese's fighting spirit was high and they were still determined to capture Lu'an. The First Army had also taken losses with 194 killed and 196 wounded in September.

In early October 1939, the First Army launched the Mopping-Up Operation around Lu'an, deploying approximately five battalions from the 20th Division, three battalions from the 109th Division, and half a battalion each from the 36th Division and 4th Independent Mixed Brigade to annihilate the enemy at Changzi. Despite inflicting heavy casualties on the 45th and 46th Divisions, the Chinese Army remained deeply entrenched in the Lu'an area, requiring several more mopping-up operations by the Japanese Army. After the successful occupation of the Lu’an area, the southern mountainous areas and the Zhongtiao Mountains became the primary base for the Chongqing Army in Shanxi. With the goal of expanding the occupied areas, the North China Area Army planned to launch a campaign to destroy these Central Army troops in the spring of 1940.

== Commemoration ==
In September 1939, Liu Shirong, commander of the 39th Division, was awarded the "Medal for Honorable Chinese Descendants" for "effective command in capturing Jincheng". In 2001, during an investigation of historical materials and relics related to the anti-Japanese struggle in the Taihang Mountains, tombstones of soldiers of the 40th Army of the National Revolutionary Army who died fighting the Japanese Army sixty years ago were discovered along Changping Village and Yaotou Village. On December 10 of the same year, the "Changping Blocking Battle Site and Cemeteries of Anti-Japanese Fallen Soldiers" were designated as a cultural relic site, encompassing the former battlefields of Changping, Mengliangzhai, Yaotou, and Guanye Slope and the burial sites of fallen soldiers in the Changping and Yaotou areas.
