= Nanliang, Shanxi =

Nanliang 南梁镇
- Town
- Location in Shanxi
- Coordinates: 35°40′18″N 111°45′8″E
- Country: People's Republic of China
- Province: Shanxi
- Prefecture-level city: Linfen
- County: Yicheng County

Area
  - Total: 128.12 km^{2} (49.47 sq mi)

Population (2018)
  - Total: 41,961
  - Density: 327.51/km^{2} (848.26/sq mi)
- Time zone: UTC+8 (China Standard)

Nanliang (Chinese: 南梁) is a town of Yicheng County, Shanxi, China. As of 2018, it has one residential community and 30 villages under its administration. The town spans an area of 128.12 square kilometres (49.47 sq mi), and has a hukou population of 41,961 as of 2018.
