= Shangma Subdistrict, Houma =

Shangma Subdistrict 上马街道
- Subdistrict
- Location in Shanxi
- Coordinates: 35°35′22″N 111°20′43″E
- Country: People's Republic of China
- Province: Shanxi
- Prefecture-level city: Linfen
- County-level city: Houma
- Time zone: UTC+8 (China Standard)

Shangma Subdistrict (simplified Chinese: 上马街道; traditional Chinese: 上馬街道; pinyin: Shàngmǎ Jiēdào) is a subdistrict in Houma, Shanxi province, China. As of 2018, it has one residential community and 19 villages under its administration.

== See also ==
- List of township-level divisions of Shanxi
