= Jiefang Road Subdistrict, Linfen =

Jiefang Road Subdistrict 解放路街道
- Subdistrict
- Location within Shanxi
- Coordinates: 36°05′03″N 111°31′04″E
- Country: China
- Province: Shanxi
- Prefecture-level city: Linfen
- District: Yaodu District

Population (2010)
  - Total: 60,070

Jiefang Road Subdistrict (Chinese: 解放路街道; pinyin: Jiěfàng Lù Jiēdào; lit. 'liberation road subdistrict') is a subdistrict in Yaodu District, Linfen, Shanxi, China. As of the 2010 Chinese Census, the subdistrict's population is 60,070.

== Administrative divisions ==
Jiefang Road Subdistrict administers the following six residential communities:

- Nanhui Community (Chinese: 商会社区)
- Pingyang Community (Chinese: 平阳社区)
- Lüyuan Community (Chinese: 绿苑社区)
- Shifu Community (Chinese: 市府社区)
- Qufu Community (Chinese: 区府社区)
- Jinlong Community (Chinese: 金龙社区)

== Demographics ==
The subdistrict's recorded population in the 2010 Chinese Census totaled 60,070, a substantial increase from the 36,673 recorded in the 2000 Chinese Census. This increase reflects the sizable population growth of the wider area, with Yaodu District's population growing by approximately 30% over the same span of time.
