= Hechuan, Shanxi =

Hechuan 和川镇
- Town
- Location in Shanxi
- Coordinates: 36°15′58″N 112°14′3″E
- Country: People's Republic of China
- Province: Shanxi
- Prefecture-level city: Linfen
- County: Anze County

Area
  - Total: 312.77 km^{2} (120.76 sq mi)

Population (2018)
  - Total: 11,849
  - Density: 37.884/km^{2} (98.119/sq mi)
- Time zone: UTC+8 (China Standard)

Hechuan (Chinese: 和川; pinyin: Héchuān) is a town under the administration of Anze County, Shanxi, China. The town spans an area of 312.77 square kilometres (120.76 mi^{2}), and has a hukou population of 11,849 as of 2018.

== Administrative divisions ==
As of 2020, it has 18 villages under its administration:

- Hechuan Village
- Shangxian Village (上县村)
- Xihongyi Village (西洪驿村)
- Donghongyi Village (东洪驿村)
- Kongwang Village (孔旺村)
- Shiqu Village (石渠村)
- Lingnan Village (岭南村)
- Jing Village (荆村)
- Fajing Village (法井村)
- Qinhezhuang Village (沁河庄村)
- Luoyun Village (罗云村)
- Chedao Village (车道村)
- Shuangtou Village (双头村)
- Yiting Village (议亭村)
- Beiyadi Village (北崖底村)
- Anshang Village (安上村)
- Shangtian Village (上田村)
- Hedong Village (河东村)
