= Fushan County =

Fushan County 浮山县 Fowshan
- County
- Location of the seat in Shanxi
- Coordinates: 35°58′05″N 111°50′56″E
- Country: People's Republic of China
- Province: Shanxi
- Prefecture-level city: Linfen

Area
  - Total: 940.6 km^{2} (363.2 sq mi)

Population (2010)
  - Total: 127,831
  - Density: 135.9/km^{2} (352.0/sq mi)
- Time zone: UTC+8 (China Standard)
- Postal code: 042600
- Website: www.fushan.gov.cn

Fushan County (Chinese: 浮山县; pinyin: Fúshān Xiàn) is a county in prefecture-level city of Linfen, in southern Shanxi Province, China. The county spans an area of 940.6 square kilometers, and has a population of 127,831 as of 2010.

== History ==
During the Spring and Autumn period, the area of present-day Fushan County belonged to the Jin State. The area would later become part of the Wei during the Warring States period.

The area was part of the Qin dynasty, administered under Xiangling County in the Hedong Commandery.

Fushan County was first set up in 619 CE.

In the Song dynasty, the area was part of Pingyang Prefecture, but would briefly be placed in Jinning Circuit during the Yuan dynasty. Upon the establishment of the Ming dynasty, the area would be re-organized as part of the Pingyang Prefecture, which it would remain under throughout the Ming dynasty as well as the Qing dynasty.

During the Republic of China, the area was part of Hedong Circuit.

On September 13, 2009, county officials allegedly launched a raid against an unregistered church in the county, stating that the church was built illegally. According to the group ChinaAid, several worshipers were struck, and some of them were taken to hospital. The building was destroyed, and various people involved with the church were detained. A county executive officer said that, as the church was not licensed, one could not say that it was a "place of worship", but the issue was merely a matter of demolishing an illegal structure "without a land certificate or construction design. The construction department and the land department government had talked to them several times before it was pulled down." he denied any violence had taken place, and refused to give his name to reporters.

== Geography ==
Fushan County is located in the south of Shanxi Province, bordering Yaodu District and Xiangfen County to the west, Yicheng County to the south, Anze County to the east, Gu County to the north, and Qinshui County to the southeast. The county varies in altitude from 650 meters in height to 1,511.8 meters in height.

=== Climate ===
The annual average temperature in Fushan County is 11.2 °C, the annual average frost-free period is 191 days, the annual average precipitation is 534.2 millimeters, and the average amount of sunshine per year totals 2,298.8 hours.

Climate data for Fushan, elevation 817 m (2,680 ft), (1991–2020 normals, extremes 1981–2010)
Month	Jan	Feb	Mar	Apr	May	Jun	Jul	Aug	Sep	Oct	Nov	Dec	Year
Record high °C (°F)	15.4 (59.7)	21.5 (70.7)	28.2 (82.8)	33.9 (93.0)	36.4 (97.5)	38.7 (101.7)	38.3 (100.9)	36.5 (97.7)	36.5 (97.7)	29.7 (85.5)	24.2 (75.6)	15.7 (60.3)	38.7 (101.7)
Mean daily maximum °C (°F)	3.2 (37.8)	7.3 (45.1)	13.6 (56.5)	20.5 (68.9)	25.4 (77.7)	29.5 (85.1)	30.4 (86.7)	28.6 (83.5)	24.0 (75.2)	18.0 (64.4)	10.9 (51.6)	4.5 (40.1)	18.0 (64.4)
Daily mean °C (°F)	−2.4 (27.7)	1.4 (34.5)	7.4 (45.3)	14.1 (57.4)	19.3 (66.7)	23.4 (74.1)	24.9 (76.8)	23.3 (73.9)	18.5 (65.3)	12.4 (54.3)	5.3 (41.5)	−0.9 (30.4)	12.2 (54.0)
Mean daily minimum °C (°F)	−6.5 (20.3)	−3.0 (26.6)	2.3 (36.1)	8.3 (46.9)	13.2 (55.8)	17.7 (63.9)	20.2 (68.4)	18.9 (66.0)	14.1 (57.4)	7.9 (46.2)	1.2 (34.2)	−4.8 (23.4)	7.5 (45.4)
Record low °C (°F)	−18.4 (−1.1)	−16.1 (3.0)	−11.9 (10.6)	−3.7 (25.3)	2.6 (36.7)	8.1 (46.6)	13.5 (56.3)	10.8 (51.4)	3.3 (37.9)	−5.3 (22.5)	−16.2 (2.8)	−19.2 (−2.6)	−19.2 (−2.6)
Average precipitation mm (inches)	4.8 (0.19)	7.2 (0.28)	10.7 (0.42)	32.4 (1.28)	45.1 (1.78)	64.1 (2.52)	126.4 (4.98)	102.8 (4.05)	73.1 (2.88)	44.7 (1.76)	19.7 (0.78)	3.6 (0.14)	534.6 (21.06)
Average precipitation days (≥ 0.1 mm)	2.9	3.5	4.1	5.8	7.6	9.0	12.0	11.4	9.3	6.4	4.7	2.7	79.4
Average snowy days	3.8	3.5	2.0	0.3	0	0	0	0	0	0	1.6	2.8	14
Average relative humidity (%)	50	49	46	48	51	56	69	73	70	66	59	50	57
Mean monthly sunshine hours	154.4	153.0	188.6	216.5	234.8	216.6	199.3	181.4	163.6	164.6	158.4	156.3	2,187.5
Percentage possible sunshine	50	49	51	55	54	50	45	44	45	48	52	52	50
Source: China Meteorological Administration

== Administrative divisions ==
Fushan County has two towns and seven townships.

The county's two towns are Tiantan, which serves as the county's seat of government, and Xiangshuihe.

The county's seven townships are Zhangzhuang Township, Dongzhang Township, Huainian Township, Beiwang Township, Beihan Township, Mijiayuan Township, and Zhaigeta Township.

== Economy ==
Fushan County has a number of significant mineral deposits, including iron, coal, gold, baryte, and clay. The county's iron ore reserves total 120 million tons, accounting for 60% of the total reserves of Linfen. The proven reserves of coal total 7.6 billion tons, the proven reserves of gold total 0.76 million tons, the proven reserves of limestone total 19.47 million tons, the proven reserves of baryte total 630,000 tons, and the proven reserves of refractory clay total 839,000 tons.

== Transportation ==
=== Rail ===
The Linfen Central-South railway, the Houma–Yueshan railway, and the Datong–Puzhou railway all pass through Fushan County.

=== Road ===
National Highway 208, National Highway 309, and the Changlin Expressway section of the G22 Qingdao–Lanzhou Expressway all pass through Fushan County.
