= Gu County =

Gu County 古县
- County
- Location of the seat in Shanxi
- Coordinates: 36°16′03″N 111°55′11″E
- Country: People's Republic of China
- Province: Shanxi
- Prefecture-level city: Linfen

Area
  - Total: 1,196 km^{2} (462 sq mi)

Population (2010)
  - Total: 91,798
  - Density: 76.75/km^{2} (198.8/sq mi)
- Time zone: UTC+8 (China Standard)
- Postal code: 042400
- Division code: GUX
- Website: http://www.guxian.gov.cn/

Gu County or Guxian (simplified Chinese: 古县; traditional Chinese: 古縣; pinyin: Gǔ Xiàn) is a county in the south of Shanxi Province, China, under the administration of the prefecture-level city of Linfen. The county spans an area of 1,196 square kilometers, and has a population of 91,798 as of 2010.

== History ==
The area was first incorporated under Emperor Xiaozhuang of the Northern Wei dynasty in 528 CE under the name Anze County (安泽县). The county was placed under the administration of Qinzhou upon its formation in 596 CE, during the Sui dynasty.

In 606 CE the Anze County was renamed to Yueyang County (岳阳县). Yueyang County underwent numerous boundary changes, but retained its name until 1914, when its name was reverted to Anze County. During the Republic of China, the county belonged to Hedong Circuit, but underwent various reorganizations during the Japanese Invasion of China.

In August 1971, Gu County was formed with seven townships from Anze County and three from Fushan County. In 1973, the county center was built up from Zhangjiagou Village (张家沟村) and Wanli Village (湾里村).

== Geography ==
Gu County spans an area of 1,196 kilometers, and ranges in altitude from 590 meters to 2,346 meters in height. The main rivers which flow through the county include the Jian River, the Shibi River, the Lin River, the Guxian River, and the Caizi River.

== Climate ==
Climate data for Guxian, elevation 649 m (2,129 ft), (1991–2020 normals, extremes 1981–present)
Month	Jan	Feb	Mar	Apr	May	Jun	Jul	Aug	Sep	Oct	Nov	Dec	Year
Record high °C (°F)	19.0 (66.2)	23.4 (74.1)	29.2 (84.6)	34.0 (93.2)	36.8 (98.2)	39.3 (102.7)	38.9 (102.0)	39.7 (103.5)	36.6 (97.9)	30.5 (86.9)	24.8 (76.6)	16.4 (61.5)	39.7 (103.5)
Mean daily maximum °C (°F)	3.8 (38.8)	8.3 (46.9)	14.7 (58.5)	21.4 (70.5)	26.4 (79.5)	30.6 (87.1)	31.4 (88.5)	29.6 (85.3)	24.9 (76.8)	19.0 (66.2)	11.5 (52.7)	5.0 (41.0)	18.9 (66.0)
Daily mean °C (°F)	−3.3 (26.1)	0.9 (33.6)	7.1 (44.8)	14.0 (57.2)	19.1 (66.4)	23.5 (74.3)	25.4 (77.7)	23.7 (74.7)	18.5 (65.3)	11.9 (53.4)	4.6 (40.3)	−1.8 (28.8)	12.0 (53.5)
Mean daily minimum °C (°F)	−8.3 (17.1)	−4.3 (24.3)	1.1 (34.0)	7.3 (45.1)	12.3 (54.1)	17.2 (63.0)	20.4 (68.7)	19.2 (66.6)	13.8 (56.8)	7.0 (44.6)	−0.1 (31.8)	−6.4 (20.5)	6.6 (43.9)
Record low °C (°F)	−18.2 (−0.8)	−17.7 (0.1)	−10.9 (12.4)	−5.6 (21.9)	0.2 (32.4)	6.7 (44.1)	14.0 (57.2)	9.6 (49.3)	1.5 (34.7)	−5.7 (21.7)	−15.0 (5.0)	−20.1 (−4.2)	−20.1 (−4.2)
Average precipitation mm (inches)	4.4 (0.17)	7.6 (0.30)	11.1 (0.44)	30.8 (1.21)	41.2 (1.62)	61.6 (2.43)	138.2 (5.44)	100.2 (3.94)	67.9 (2.67)	38.0 (1.50)	17.8 (0.70)	3.7 (0.15)	522.5 (20.57)
Average precipitation days (≥ 0.1 mm)	2.9	3.6	4.1	5.4	7.0	9.7	12.9	10.7	8.8	6.9	4.5	2.7	79.2
Average snowy days	3.8	4.0	1.6	0.3	0	0	0	0	0	0	1.5	2.8	14
Average relative humidity (%)	55	53	50	51	55	58	69	73	73	70	64	58	61
Mean monthly sunshine hours	123.9	130.9	163.1	192.9	212.0	189.3	173.5	167.4	148.2	147.4	136.6	129.2	1,914.4
Percentage possible sunshine	40	42	44	49	49	43	39	40	40	43	45	43	43
Source: China Meteorological Administration all-time August record high

== Administrative divisions ==
The county is divided into four towns and three townships. The county government is stationed in the town of Yueyang.

The county's four towns are Yueyang, Beiping, Guyang, and Jiuxian.

The county's three townships are Shibi Township, Yongle Township, and Nanyuan Township.
