= Linjie Deng =

Chinese-American artist

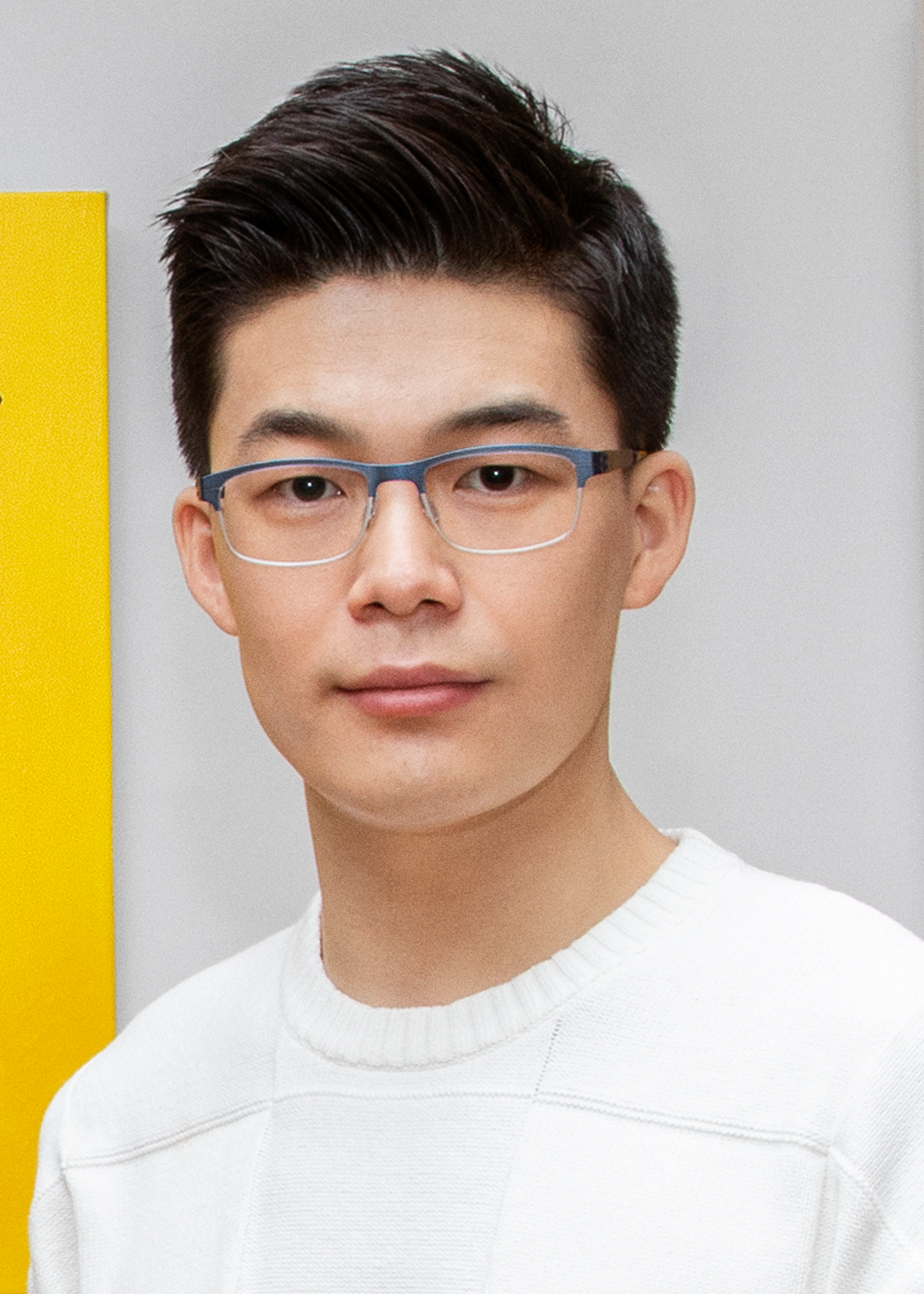
- Born: 1992 (age 33–34); Linfen City, China
- Occupation: Visual Artist
- Known for: Visual Artist
- Movement: Contemporary art
- Website: linjiedeng.com

Linjie Deng (born July 25, 1992 in Linfen, China) is a Chinese-American multi-media and contemporary artist.

== Early life and education ==
Deng was born July 25, 1992, in Linfen City, Shanxi Province, China. He received a bachelor of fine arts degree from Beijing City University in 2015.

Deng began painting at age six, but he gained recognition in 2015 when an art lover collected his Chinese seal and calligraphy artworks for $80,000. In the same year, he moved to New York, where he completed his master of fine arts degree from the School of Visual Arts in 2017.

== Career ==
In 2019, Deng designed posters for the UN Global Callout to Creatives and designed paintings with slogans including Wash Your Hands, Stay Home, Save Lives. He offered his pandemic-influenced art on the Artavita website, with all sales donated to The New York-Presbyterian Hospital’s healthcare workers. In the same year, Deng created the Yin-Yang series, a selection of contemporary calligraphy works consisting of mutually opposing and coexisting ideas: freedom and hope, hard work and luck, proud and humble. Libbie Mugrabi collected his Yin-Yang Series calligraphy in Art Basel Miami Beach.

In 2021, Deng showcased his works after experiencing Asian hate crime on the subway. That led him to SCOPE Art Fair, where he exhibited three yellow works, with one work spotlighting Stop Asian Hate; Start American Love. In addition, Deng created Make America United Again, a series directed at the Asian-American community. He has also designed NFTs, and his NFT work was featured at the Portion Street X Pop Art Week.

In 2020, Deng was invited to his solo exhibition at Chameleon 2020. In the same year, he was a featured international level artist at the Hamptons Virtual Art Fair (HVAF). Deng's work has also been shown in China, Carlton Fine Art Gallery New York, The Hamptons Fine Art Fair, Art Basel Miami Beach, Dream Tattoo calligraphy public show, Stop Asian Hate Campaign, The United Nations, and New York Con Artist Collection.

== Solo exhibitions ==
- 2025 Still Warm - Hamptons Fine Arts Fair, The Hamptons, New York.
- 2025 Snake Around, Sneak Around - Carlton Fine Arts Gallery, Manhattan, New York.
- 2024 Circle of Life - Hamptons Fine Arts Fair, The Hamptons, New York.
- 2023 Locker Room - Hamptons Fine Arts Fair, The Hamptons, New York.
- 2022 Double Sided - Hamptons Fine Arts Fair, The Hamptons, New York.
- 2021 Yin-Yang - Art Basel, SCOPE Art Show, Miami Beach.
- 2021 Young Forever - Hamptons Fine Arts Fair, The Hamptons, New York.
- 2021 Stop Asian Hate, Start American Love - Carlton Fine Arts Gallery, Manhattan, New York.
- 2021 Lost Museum - Carlton Fine Arts Gallery, Manhattan, New York.
- 2020 Chameleon 2020 - Southampton Arts Center, The Hamptons, New York.

== Group exhibitions ==
- 2023 - The Year of Rabbit Chinese Calligraphy Art Performance - Tiffany & Co., New York.
- 2021 - Queer Art 1950's-2021, - Carlton Fine Arts Gallery, New York.
- 2017 - I'm Gay. Would You Like To Give Me A Hug? - Public Performance Art, Sanlitun, Beijing.

== Public speaking ==
- 2022 - Who Am I? - Third Annual Pride Artist Panel Museum of Arts and Design, New York.
- 2017 - Togayther - School of Visual Arts, New York.
- 2015 - The Frog Can Also Jump Out of The Well - Super Speaker TV Talk Show, Beijing Radio and Television Station.

== TV Show ==
- 2025 - Discussed his solo exhibition Still Warm at the Hamptons Fine Art Fair. - Fox 5 New York.
- 2025 - Appeared as a guest artist to celebrate the Chinese Snake Year and introduce his exhibition Snake Around, Sneak Around. A portion of the proceeds was donated to the American Red Cross for LA wildfire relief.. - Fox 5 New York.
- 2021 - Featured as a guest artist to present his solo exhibition Asian Art SPA at Carlton Fine Art Gallery. - Fox 5 New York.
