= Monan, Shanxi =

Town in Shanxi, China

Monan 陌南镇
- Town
- Location in Shanxi
- Coordinates: 34°45′11″N 110°52′57″E
- Country: People's Republic of China
- Province: Shanxi
- Prefecture-level city: Yuncheng
- County: Ruicheng
- Village-level divisions: 19 villages
- Elevation: 537 m (1,762 ft)
- Time zone: UTC+8 (China Standard)
- Area code: 0359

Monan (Chinese: 陌南; pinyin: Mònán) is a town under the administration of Ruicheng County in far southern Shanxi province, China, situated on the northern (left) bank of the Yellow River, across which lies Henan province, on the southern slopes of the Zhongtiao Mountains. It is located 18 kilometres (11 mi) northeast of the county seat, 31 km (19 mi) southwest of Yuncheng, and 29 km (18 mi) west of Sanmenxia, Henan. As of 2011, it has 19 villages under its administration.

== See also ==
- List of township-level divisions of Shanxi
