= Yaodu District =

Yaodu 尧都区
- District
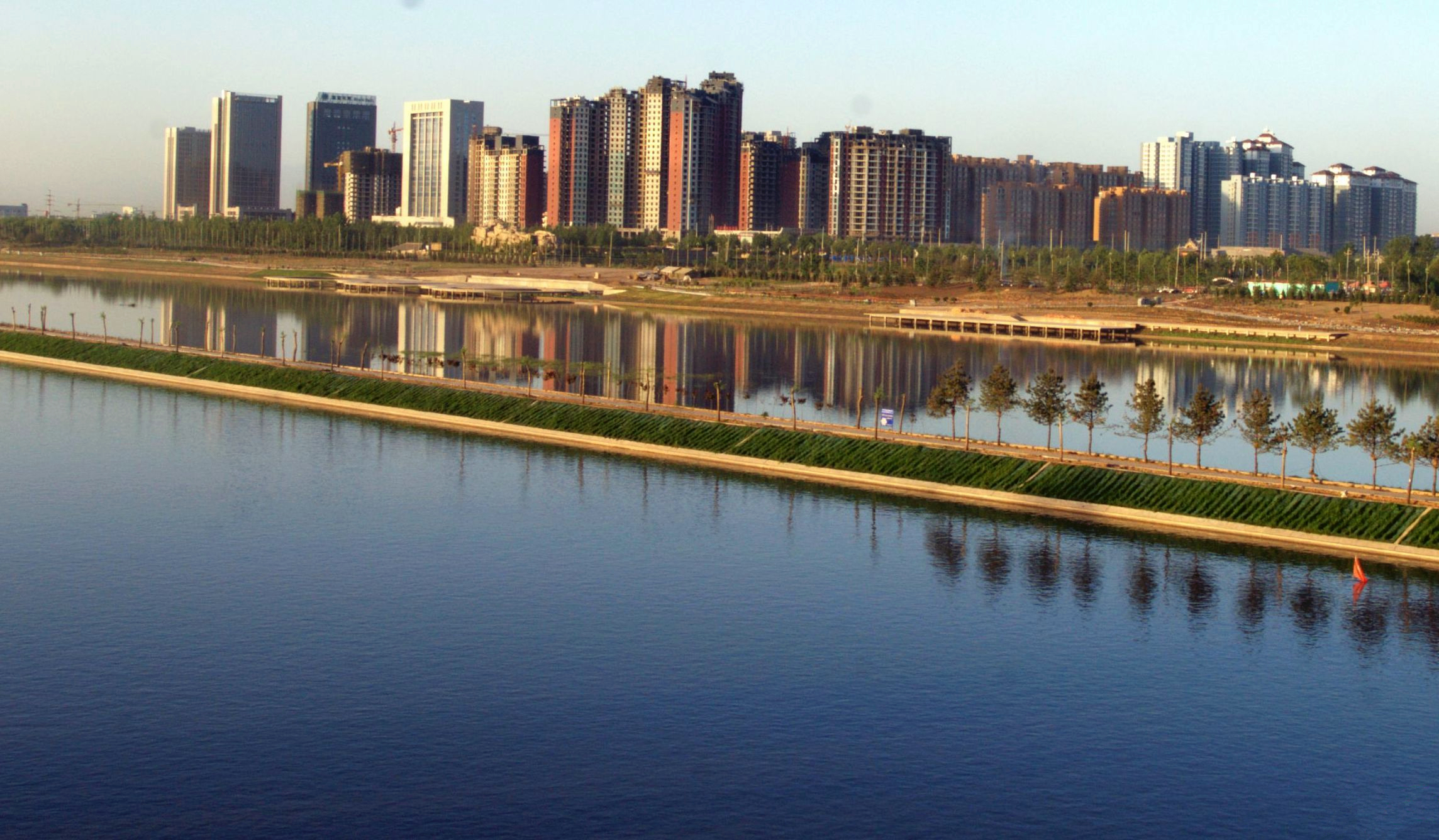

- Location in Shanxi
- Coordinates (Yaodu District government): 36°04′43″N 111°34′46″E
- Country: People's Republic of China
- Province: Shanxi
- Prefecture-level city: Linfen

Area
  - Total: 1,307 km^{2} (505 sq mi)

Population (2010)
  - Total: 944,050
  - Density: 722.3/km^{2} (1,871/sq mi)
- Time zone: UTC+8 (China Standard)
- Postal code: 041000
- Website: http://yaodu.linfen.gov.cn/

Yaodu District (simplified Chinese: 尧都区; traditional Chinese: 堯都區; pinyin: Yáodū Qū) is a district of the city of Linfen, Shanxi Province, China. Yaodu spans 1,307 square kilometers in area, and has a population of 944,050 as of 2010. The district serves at the administrative center for Linfen.

== Geography ==
The Lüliang Mountains run through the western portion of the district, and the Fen River runs through the center of the district.

== History ==
The area was established as Pingyang County (平阳县; 平陽縣) in 514 BCE during the Jin State. Pingyang County remained in effect until Wang Mang changed the area's name to Xiangping (香平). In 247 CE, Pingyang County was re-established, and remained in effect until 481 CE. Six years later, in 487 CE, the county was re-established, but would intermittently be abolished and re-established until 1116.

In 1116, Pingyang Fu (平阳府; 平陽府) was established. Pingyang Fu was revoked in 1220, but would be re-established in 1368 with the establishment of the Ming Dynasty.

During the Republic of China, the county's Circuit and Fu were dissolved, and the area was administered by the province.

Linfen was first established in 1948 as a county-level division, which it remained until November 1, 2000. Upon the promotion of Linfen to a prefecture-level division, Yaodu District was established as the county-level administrative center of the city.

== Administrative divisions ==
Yaodu is divided into 10 subdistricts, 10 towns, and 6 townships. These divisions are then divided into 57 residential communities and 372 administrative villages. The districts administrative offices are located in Tieludong Subdistrict.

=== Subdistricts ===
The district's 10 subdistricts are Jiefang Road Subdistrict, Gulou West Street Subdistrict, Shuita Street Subdistrict, Nanjie Subdistrict, Xiangxian Street Subdistrict, Xinsi Street Subdistrict, Tieludong Subdistrict, Chezhan Street Subdistrict, Fenhe Subdistrict, and Binhe Subdistrict.

=== Towns ===
The district's 10 towns are Tunli, Qiaoli, Dayang, Xiandi, Liucun, Jindian, Wucun, Tumen, Weicun, and Yaomiao.

=== Townships ===
The district's 6 townships are Duandian Township, Jiade Township, Hejiazhuang Township, Yipingyuan Township, Zhentou Township, and Hedi Township.
