= Ji River (disambiguation) =

The Ji River usually refers to the former major river of Shandong, China, effectively destroyed during the 1852 Yellow River flood.

It may also refer to:

- Ji River (姬水, Jī Shuǐ) in Chinese legend, usually identified with the Fen River in Shanxi, China

== See also ==
- Jishui River
