= Houma, Shanxi =

Houma 侯马市
- County-level city
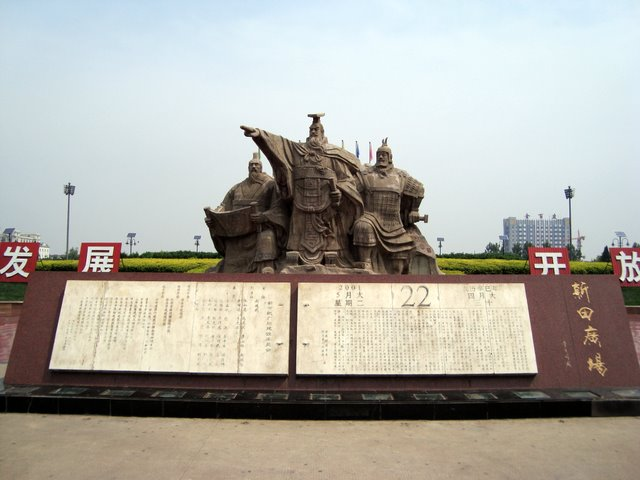
- Xintian Square

- Location of the city center in Shanxi
- Coordinates (Houma municipal government): 35°37′09″N 111°22′19″E
- Country: People's Republic of China
- Province: Shanxi
- Prefecture-level city: Linfen

Area
  - County-level city: 220.1 km^{2} (85.0 sq mi)
  - Urban: 20.43 km^{2} (7.89 sq mi)

Population (2017)
  - County-level city: 251,000
  - Density: 1,140/km^{2} (2,950/sq mi)
  - Urban: 158,900
- Time zone: UTC+8 (China Standard)

Houma (simplified Chinese: 侯马; traditional Chinese: 侯馬; pinyin: Hóumǎ) is a county-level city in the southwest of the Shanxi province of the People's Republic of China, on the Fen River - the tributary of Yellow River; it is under the administration of Linfen City. Houma has an area of 220.1 km^{2} (85.0 sq mi) and has a population of 251,000 as of 2017.

Houma, known as Xintian in ancient times, was the capital of the state of Jin from 585 BCE to 376 BCE. Ancient bronzeware workshops, spade money, and a number of other historical relics have been excavated in Houma.

== Administrative divisions ==
Houma directly administers 5 subdistricts and 3 townships, which are subsequently divided into 76 administrative villages and 28 residential communities. The city's five subdistricts are Ludong Subdistrict, Luxi Subdistrict, Huibin Subdistrict, Shangma Subdistrict, and Zhangcun Subdistrict. The city's three townships are Xintian Township, Gaocun Township, and Fengcheng Township. Houma's administrative offices are located in the Ludong Subdistrict.

== Geography and Climate ==
Houma experiences an average annual temperature of 12.6 °C (54.7 °F). The forest coverage rate of the whole of Houma is 22.5%, with 44.9% of its urban area being forested. Mineral deposits in Houma include iron, copper, gold, and granite.

Climate data for Houma, elevation 434 m (1,424 ft), (1991–2020 normals, extremes 1981–2010)
| Month | Jan | Feb | Mar | Apr | May | Jun | Jul | Aug | Sep | Oct | Nov | Dec | Year |
|---|---|---|---|---|---|---|---|---|---|---|---|---|---|
| Record high °C (°F) | 14.3 (57.7) | 22.4 (72.3) | 29.0 (84.2) | 35.8 (96.4) | 39.4 (102.9) | 40.9 (105.6) | 41.2 (106.2) | 39.1 (102.4) | 38.8 (101.8) | 31.8 (89.2) | 25.4 (77.7) | 15.2 (59.4) | 41.2 (106.2) |
| Mean daily maximum °C (°F) | 4.8 (40.6) | 9.5 (49.1) | 16.0 (60.8) | 22.7 (72.9) | 27.6 (81.7) | 32.1 (89.8) | 32.7 (90.9) | 30.8 (87.4) | 26.2 (79.2) | 20.1 (68.2) | 12.5 (54.5) | 5.9 (42.6) | 20.1 (68.1) |
| Daily mean °C (°F) | −1.8 (28.8) | 2.5 (36.5) | 8.8 (47.8) | 15.4 (59.7) | 20.5 (68.9) | 25.2 (77.4) | 26.8 (80.2) | 25.0 (77.0) | 20.0 (68.0) | 13.4 (56.1) | 5.8 (42.4) | −0.6 (30.9) | 13.4 (56.1) |
| Mean daily minimum °C (°F) | −6.8 (19.8) | −2.8 (27.0) | 2.8 (37.0) | 8.8 (47.8) | 13.7 (56.7) | 18.8 (65.8) | 21.7 (71.1) | 20.4 (68.7) | 15.2 (59.4) | 8.4 (47.1) | 1.0 (33.8) | −5.2 (22.6) | 8.0 (46.4) |
| Record low °C (°F) | −19.0 (−2.2) | −19.2 (−2.6) | −11.0 (12.2) | −3.9 (25.0) | 1.4 (34.5) | 9.6 (49.3) | 14.8 (58.6) | 12.0 (53.6) | 2.9 (37.2) | −5.4 (22.3) | −14.8 (5.4) | −21.4 (−6.5) | −21.4 (−6.5) |
| Average precipitation mm (inches) | 6.5 (0.26) | 9.3 (0.37) | 12.8 (0.50) | 33.6 (1.32) | 47.2 (1.86) | 52.0 (2.05) | 107.6 (4.24) | 82.1 (3.23) | 72.7 (2.86) | 45.7 (1.80) | 20.4 (0.80) | 4.2 (0.17) | 494.1 (19.46) |
| Average precipitation days (≥ 0.1 mm) | 2.7 | 3.4 | 4.5 | 5.5 | 7.4 | 8.1 | 10.1 | 8.9 | 9.1 | 7.2 | 5.0 | 2.4 | 74.3 |
| Average snowy days | 3.8 | 3.2 | 1.0 | 0.1 | 0 | 0 | 0 | 0 | 0 | 0 | 1.2 | 2.4 | 11.7 |
| Average relative humidity (%) | 59 | 57 | 53 | 54 | 56 | 57 | 69 | 73 | 74 | 72 | 70 | 62 | 63 |
| Mean monthly sunshine hours | 126.4 | 141.6 | 183.0 | 211.3 | 227.8 | 212.4 | 202.6 | 188.3 | 153.6 | 147.9 | 129.2 | 125.6 | 2,049.7 |
| Percentage possible sunshine | 40 | 46 | 49 | 53 | 52 | 49 | 46 | 46 | 42 | 43 | 42 | 42 | 46 |
Source: China Meteorological Administration

== History ==
In 585 BCE, the Jin State moved their capital to Xintian, an ancient city located in present-day Houma. Xintian remained the capital until the fall of the Jin State in 376 BCE.

Chinese Communist revolutionary and politician Peng Zhen was born in Houma, and his former residence has been converted to a tourist destination, attracting red tourism from throughout China.

=== Archaeology ===
In 1956, the famous Houma bronze casting site was discovered in the Xintian site, which is the largest and most abundant bronze-casting site ever discovered in China. The site was used from around 600BC to 380BC or even later, and a large number of very exquisite bronze casting pottery models were unearthed, commonly known as Houma pottery models. The site has been excavated several times and more than 500 identifiable pottery molds have been unearthed. The striking feature of Houma debris is the reusable clay pattern blocks used essentially as models for decoration.

Compared with making an overall model of an object, the parting model can save a lot of manpower and material resources, which reflects the skillful grasp of the utensils by the craftsmen of that period. The craftsmen make a complex object into parts, separate the mold, and make only one module for the same position and pattern, which can improve the consistency of the pattern when remodeling, and make each pattern on the same horizontal section, which improves the quality of the casting.

At the same time, there is an evidenced rise of the lost-wax casting in Eastern Zhou China. Surprisingly, no evidence of the lost-wax casting has been found in Houma so far.

== Economy ==
Houma reported a GDP of 115.2 billion Renminbi in 2019, a 3.3% increase from 2018. In 2016, the per capita disposable income was 25,725 Renminbi for the city's urban residents, and 13,177 Renminbi for the city's rural residents. By 2019, this had risen to 31,248 Renminbi and 16,413 Renminbi, respectively.

Houma's economy is reliant on the tertiary sector, which accounts for approximately 70% of the city's GDP. Over 60,000 people in the city are employed in the city's 25 large-scale wholesale markets.

== Transportation ==
- China National Highway 108
- Houma–Xi'an Railway
- Houma–Yueshan Railway
