= Anze County =

Anze County 安泽县 Antseh
- County
- Location of the seat in Shanxi
- Coordinates: 36°08′56″N 112°14′55″E
- Country: People's Republic of China
- Province: Shanxi
- Prefecture-level city: Linfen

Area
  - Total: 1,967 km^{2} (759 sq mi)

Population (2010)
  - Total: 82,012
  - Density: 41.69/km^{2} (108.0/sq mi)
- Time zone: UTC+8 (China Standard)

Anze County (simplified Chinese: 安泽县; traditional Chinese: 安澤縣; pinyin: Ānzé Xiàn) is a county in the south of Shanxi Province, China, under the administration of the prefecture-level city of Linfen. The county spans an area of 1,967 square kilometers, and has a population of 82,012 as of 2010.

== History ==
The county was first established in 528 CE as part of the Northern Wei Dynasty. In 606 CE, the county was renamed to Yueyang County (岳阳县).

During the Ming Dynasty and the Qing Dynasty, the area belonged to the Pingyang Prefecture.

In 1971, Gu County split off from Anze County.

== Geography ==
The county's elevation ranges from 732 meters to 1,592 meters in height, with the county's highest point being Mount Antai (安太山). 45.44% of Anze County's land area is forested.

=== Climate ===
The county experiences an average of 2246.1 hours of sunshine annually, 539.1 millimeters of precipitation annually, 172 frost-free days annually, and an average temperature of 9.4 °C.

Climate data for Anze, elevation 860 m (2,820 ft), (1991–2020 normals, extremes 1981–2010)
Month	Jan	Feb	Mar	Apr	May	Jun	Jul	Aug	Sep	Oct	Nov	Dec	Year
Record high °C (°F)	16.6 (61.9)	22.7 (72.9)	29.4 (84.9)	34.4 (93.9)	37.1 (98.8)	38.7 (101.7)	38.7 (101.7)	36.4 (97.5)	36.6 (97.9)	29.2 (84.6)	25.2 (77.4)	16.8 (62.2)	38.7 (101.7)
Mean daily maximum °C (°F)	3.1 (37.6)	7.0 (44.6)	13.3 (55.9)	20.4 (68.7)	25.2 (77.4)	29.0 (84.2)	29.8 (85.6)	28.2 (82.8)	23.7 (74.7)	18.1 (64.6)	10.9 (51.6)	4.4 (39.9)	17.8 (64.0)
Daily mean °C (°F)	−5.7 (21.7)	−1.6 (29.1)	4.5 (40.1)	11.7 (53.1)	16.8 (62.2)	20.9 (69.6)	23.1 (73.6)	21.5 (70.7)	16.3 (61.3)	9.8 (49.6)	2.5 (36.5)	−3.9 (25.0)	9.7 (49.4)
Mean daily minimum °C (°F)	−12.2 (10.0)	−7.9 (17.8)	−2.4 (27.7)	3.9 (39.0)	8.9 (48.0)	13.6 (56.5)	17.9 (64.2)	16.8 (62.2)	11.1 (52.0)	3.9 (39.0)	−3.2 (26.2)	−9.6 (14.7)	3.4 (38.1)
Record low °C (°F)	−26.6 (−15.9)	−26.6 (−15.9)	−15.6 (3.9)	−9.2 (15.4)	−3.0 (26.6)	3.6 (38.5)	8.6 (47.5)	8.5 (47.3)	−1.6 (29.1)	−9.6 (14.7)	−20.7 (−5.3)	−25.0 (−13.0)	−26.6 (−15.9)
Average precipitation mm (inches)	4.7 (0.19)	8.6 (0.34)	11.7 (0.46)	32.3 (1.27)	47.7 (1.88)	62.8 (2.47)	137.8 (5.43)	101.6 (4.00)	78.1 (3.07)	42.7 (1.68)	20.3 (0.80)	4.4 (0.17)	552.7 (21.76)
Average precipitation days (≥ 0.1 mm)	3.1	3.9	4.6	6.1	7.7	9.9	12.7	11.5	9.7	6.8	4.8	3.1	83.9
Average snowy days	4.1	5.0	2.7	0.5	0	0	0	0	0	0.1	2.1	3.3	17.8
Average relative humidity (%)	59	59	56	55	59	66	77	79	79	74	68	61	66
Mean monthly sunshine hours	158.4	156.5	187.3	212.2	229.8	211.4	190.2	178.3	157.2	168.4	162.3	161.8	2,173.8
Percentage possible sunshine	51	51	50	54	53	49	43	43	43	49	53	54	49
Source: China Meteorological Administration

== Administrative divisions ==
The county is divided into 4 towns and 3 townships. The county government is seated in Fucheng.

The county's 4 towns are Fucheng, Hechuan, Tangcheng, and Jishi.

The county's 3 townships are Mabi Township, Ducun Township, and Liangma Township.

== Economy ==
Anze County has a number of natural resources, particularly coal. 1,944 square kilometers of land within the county has been identified as having significant coal reserves, totaling an estimated 24 billion tons of coal. Iron ore deposits within the county total an area of approximately 1.4 square kilometers, containing an estimated 1 million tons of ore. Significant reserves of calcite, porcelain clay, and methane have also been discovered within Anze County.

== Transport ==
National Highway 309 and Shanxi Provincial Road 326 both run through the county.
