= Fen River =

River in Shanxi, China

Coordinates: 35.263°N 110.391°E

- The Yellow River Basin, with the Fen on the right, joining the south-flowing Yellow River just above its eastward turn
- Chinese: 汾河
Transcriptions
Standard Mandarin
- Hanyu Pinyin: Fén Hé
- Wade–Giles: Fên^{2} Ho^{2}
- IPA: [fə̌n xɤ̌]

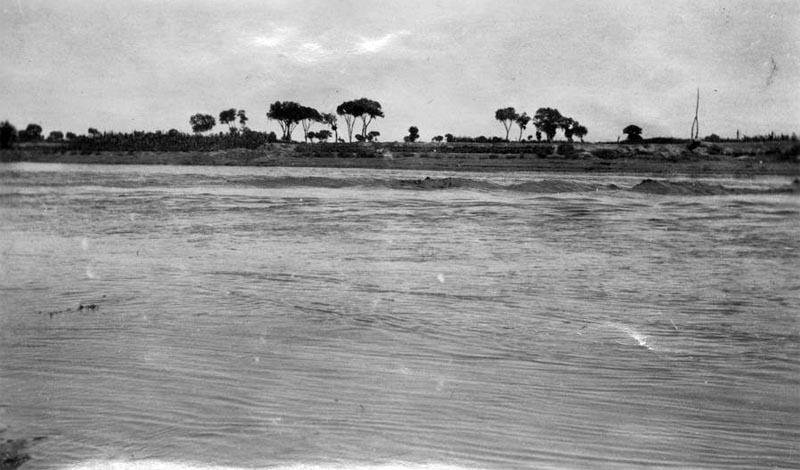
The Fen River near Fenyang in 1924.

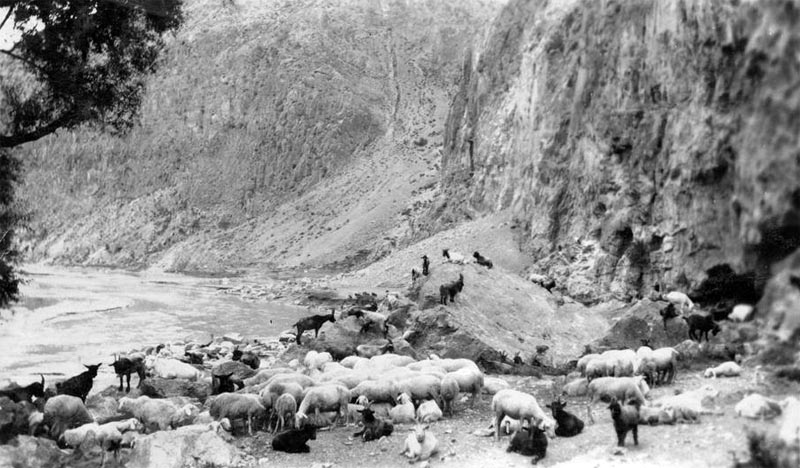
A herd of sheep on the bank of Fen River 20 kilometers to the north of Taiyuan in 1924.

The Fen River drains the center of Shanxi Province, China. It originates in the Guancen Mountains of Ningwu County in northeast Shanxi, flows southeast into the basin of Taiyuan, and then south through the central valley of Shanxi before turning west to join the Yellow River west of Hejin. The Fen and the Wei Rivers are the two largest tributaries of the Yellow River. The river is 694 kilometers (431 mi) long and drains an area of 39,417 km^{2} (15,219 sq mi), 25.3% of Shanxi's area. The Fen River is the longest in Shanxi. It is also the second-longest tributary of the Yellow River. Within Taiyuan, the Fen runs from north to south; the prefecture includes one-seventh of the river's course.

== History ==
=== Legend ===
The Fen is usually identified with the Ji River said by Sima Qian and others to have flowed beside the home of the Yellow Emperor. The Discourses of the States states that the Ji was the home of the Yellow Emperor's clan before he fought the clan of Yandi (the "Flame Emperor"). Its name is identical with the surname of the royal family under the Zhou. Pulleyblank argues, however, that the supposed "Ji River" could be a later invention as "there seems to be no record of a Ji River outside the myth" of the Yellow Emperor.

=== Ancient ===
The lower Fen was part of the core area of ancient China (aka Central Plain) and held the capital of the state of Jin near today Houma. The river nurtured the 2500-year-old Sanjin Civilization and has since been called the "Mother River of People" in Shanxi.

In Taiyuan, the Fen River valley area has fertile water resource; for this reason, the Fen area has become the economic center of Shanxi province. There are two valleys of the south region of further south. One of the valleys is the Fen River valley, it had led to the Yellow River. The second valley is the Su River, which was along the north edge of Zhongtiao Mountain; and it was forming another triangular basin. The Fen River valley offered different routes of communication in Wei River valley, that both routes were open to the either side of the Yellow River.

=== Modern ===
Modern cities on or near the Fen from north to south are: Taiyuan, Linfen, Houma, Hejin. Fenyang, although named after the river, is actually some 20-plus km to the west of it.

As with any river that flows through a city, the Fen River added extra charm to the city of Taiyuan. The construction of dams upstream, however, reduced the once-abundant flow of the river to a mere trickle, and the river bed went dry. From 1949, Chinese government built the reservoirs such as Fen River, Wenyu River, Hui River, and several other reservoirs on the tributaries of the Fen River, which ensured Taiyuan city and other cities’ industrial water, and enlarged Taiyuan basin and Linfen basin's irrigation. Before the 1950s, Fen River valley's flood areas is 133,400 hectares, saline-alkali soil is 66,700 hectares. Today, due to the influence of the water conservancy facilities, the water logging is almost inexistence, huge areas of saline-alkali soil are reformed.

=== Surrounding Introduction ===
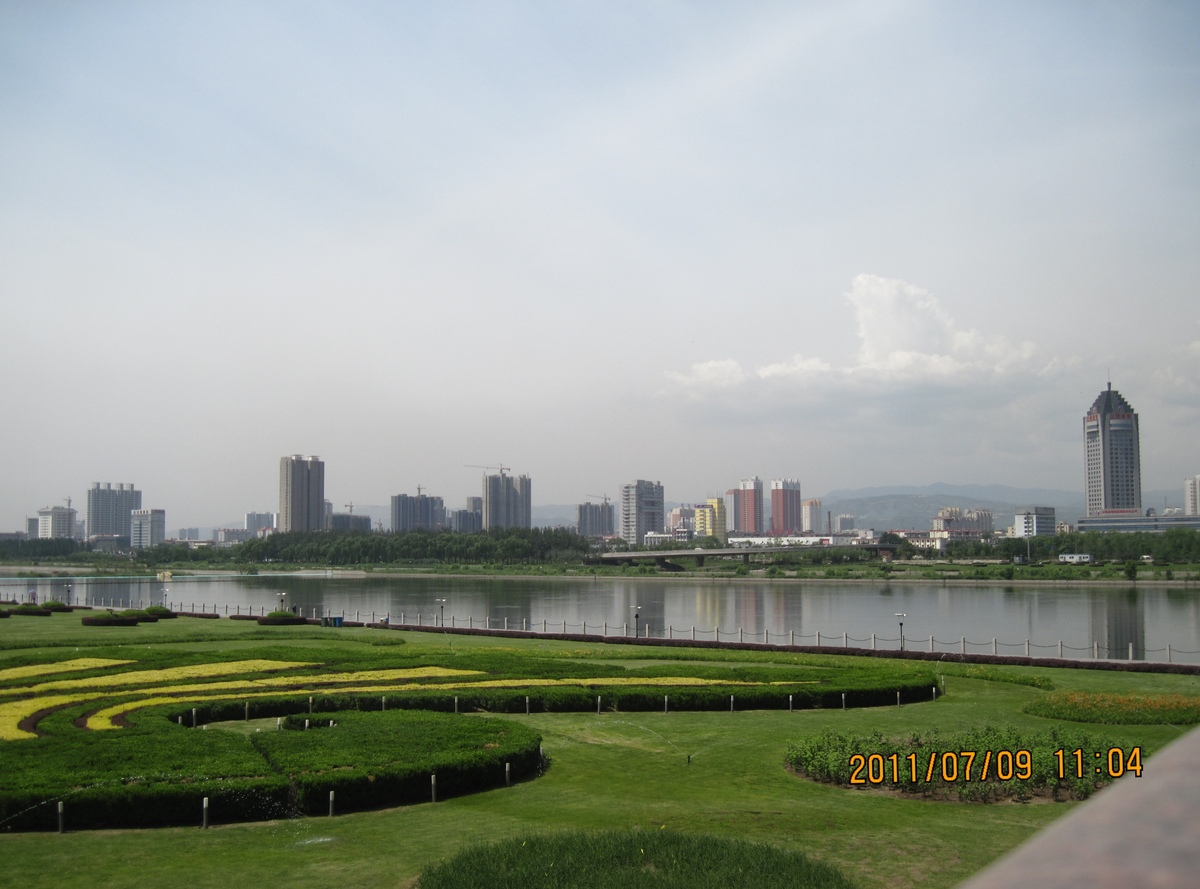
A view of the Fen River Park in central Taiyuan as of 2011.

Fen River on a historical map (double click)

In the 1990s, the municipal government of Taiyuan built artificial and removable structures across the river at different locations to create reservoirs of water for landscaping purposes. The surface area of these reservoirs amounts to 1.7 million square meters and, along with newly created vegetation of 1.3 million square meters on the banks, forms the 6-kilometer long Fen River Park. The vegetation consist of 183 species trees, shrubs and other green plants.

The No. 1 Fen River reservoir, built in 1960, is the biggest artificial reservoir in Shanxi province; it is also the scenic spot in the province. The length from south to north is 15 kilometers, the width is 5 kilometers, the total area is 32 square kilometers, and the capacity of reservoir is 720 million cubic meters. In 2000, the No. 2 Fen River Reservoir was built about 50 kilometers downstream the No. 1 Fen River Reservoir. The pollution of Fen River reservoir has become a serious problem. Because of the rise of population and the development of economy, the industrial, domestic, and other kinds of pollution have been on the rise. Great quantities of sewage are indiscriminately discharged into the riverbed downstream of the No. 1 and 2 reservoirs. However, the government is trying to fix the problem.

== See also ==
- Other Ji Rivers
