= Linfen =

Linfen 临汾市 Pingyang
- Prefecture-level city
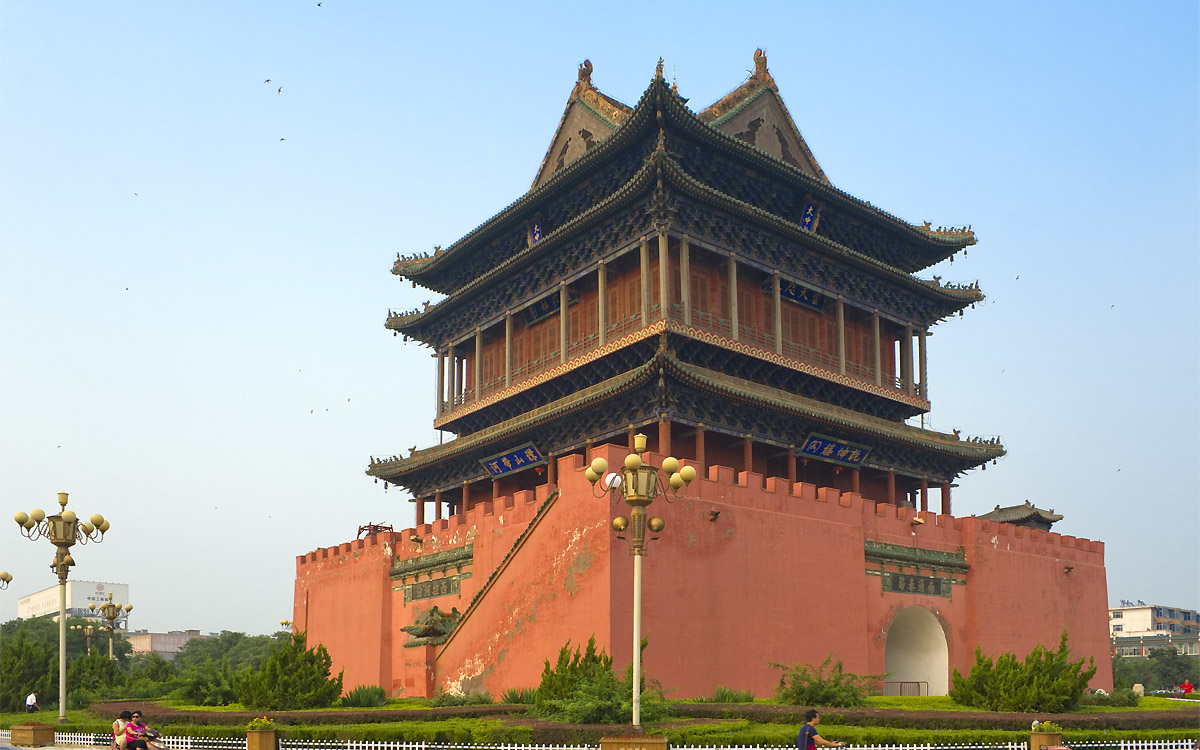
- Drum Tower of Linfen

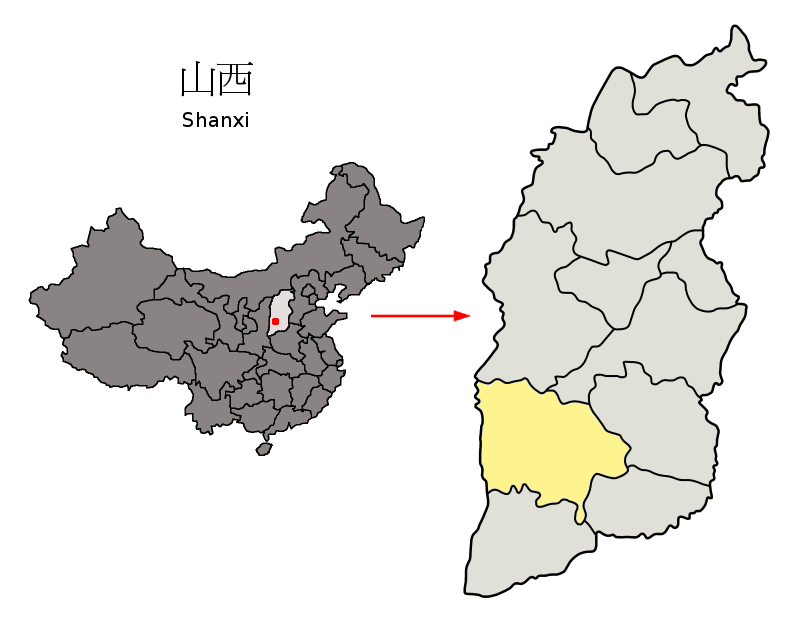
- Location of Linfen City jurisdiction in Shanxi

- Location of the city centre in Shanxi
- Coordinates (Linfen municipal government): 36°05′17″N 111°31′08″E
- Country: People's Republic of China
- Province: Shanxi
- County-level divisions: 17
- Municipal seat: Yaodu District

Government
  - Type: Prefecture-level city
  - CPC Linfen Secretary: Yue Puyu (岳普煜)
  - Mayor: Liu Yuqiang (刘予强)

Area
  - Prefecture-level city: 20,275 km^{2} (7,828 sq mi)
  - Urban: 1,307 km^{2} (505 sq mi)
  - Metro: 1,307 km^{2} (505 sq mi)
- Elevation: 452 m (1,483 ft)
- Highest elevation: 2,346.8 m (7,699 ft)
- Lowest elevation: 385.1 m (1,263 ft)

Population (2020 census)
  - Prefecture-level city: 3,976,481
  - Density: 196.13/km^{2} (507.97/sq mi)
  - Urban: 959,198
  - Urban density: 733.9/km^{2} (1,901/sq mi)
  - Metro: 959,198
  - Metro density: 733.9/km^{2} (1,901/sq mi)

GDP
  - Prefecture-level city: CN¥ 150 billion US$ 23.7 billion
  - Per capita: CN¥ 37,848; US$ 6,056
- Time zone: UTC+8 (China Standard)
- Postal code: 041000
- Area code: 0357
- ISO 3166 code: CN-SX-10
- Licence plates: 晋L
- Administrative division code: 141000
- Website: linfen.gov.cn

Linfen
- Traditional Chinese: 臨汾
- Simplified Chinese: 临汾
Transcriptions
Standard Mandarin
- Hanyu Pinyin: Línfén
- Wade–Giles: Lin-fen

Jin Prefecture Jinzhou
- Traditional Chinese: 晉州
- Simplified Chinese: 晋州
Transcriptions
Standard Mandarin
- Hanyu Pinyin: Jìnzhōu
- Wade–Giles: Chin-chou

Pingyang Commandery Pingyang
- Traditional Chinese: 平陽郡
- Simplified Chinese: 平阳郡
Transcriptions
Standard Mandarin
- Hanyu Pinyin: Píngyángjùn
- Wade–Giles: P'ing-yang Chün

Linfen (simplified Chinese: 临汾; traditional Chinese: 臨汾; pinyin: Lín Fén) is a prefecture-level city in the southwest of Shanxi province, China, bordering Shaanxi province to the west. Linfen City is located in the southern part of Shanxi Province, with the remaining branches of Taiyue to the east and the Luliang Mountains to the west. In the middle is a vast river valley plain, with the Fen River mainstream running across the north and south, and the land on both sides is fertile. It is situated along the banks of the Fen River. It has an area of 20,275 square kilometres (7,828 sq mi) and according to the 2020 Census, a population of 3,976,481 inhabitants of which 959,198 live in the built-up (or metro) area made up of Yaodu urban district. The GDP of Linfen ranked second in Shanxi Province. It was known as Pingyang (平陽) during the Spring and Autumn period. In 2006, the American Blacksmith Institute listed Linfen as one of the ten most polluted cities in the world, but air quality had improved by 2023.

Prior to 1978, Linfen was famous for its spring water, greenery and rich agriculture and therefore nicknamed "The Modern Fruit and Flower Town". Since then it has been developing into a main industrial center for coal mining, which has significantly damaged the city's environment, air quality, farming, health and its previous status as a green village.

== Name ==
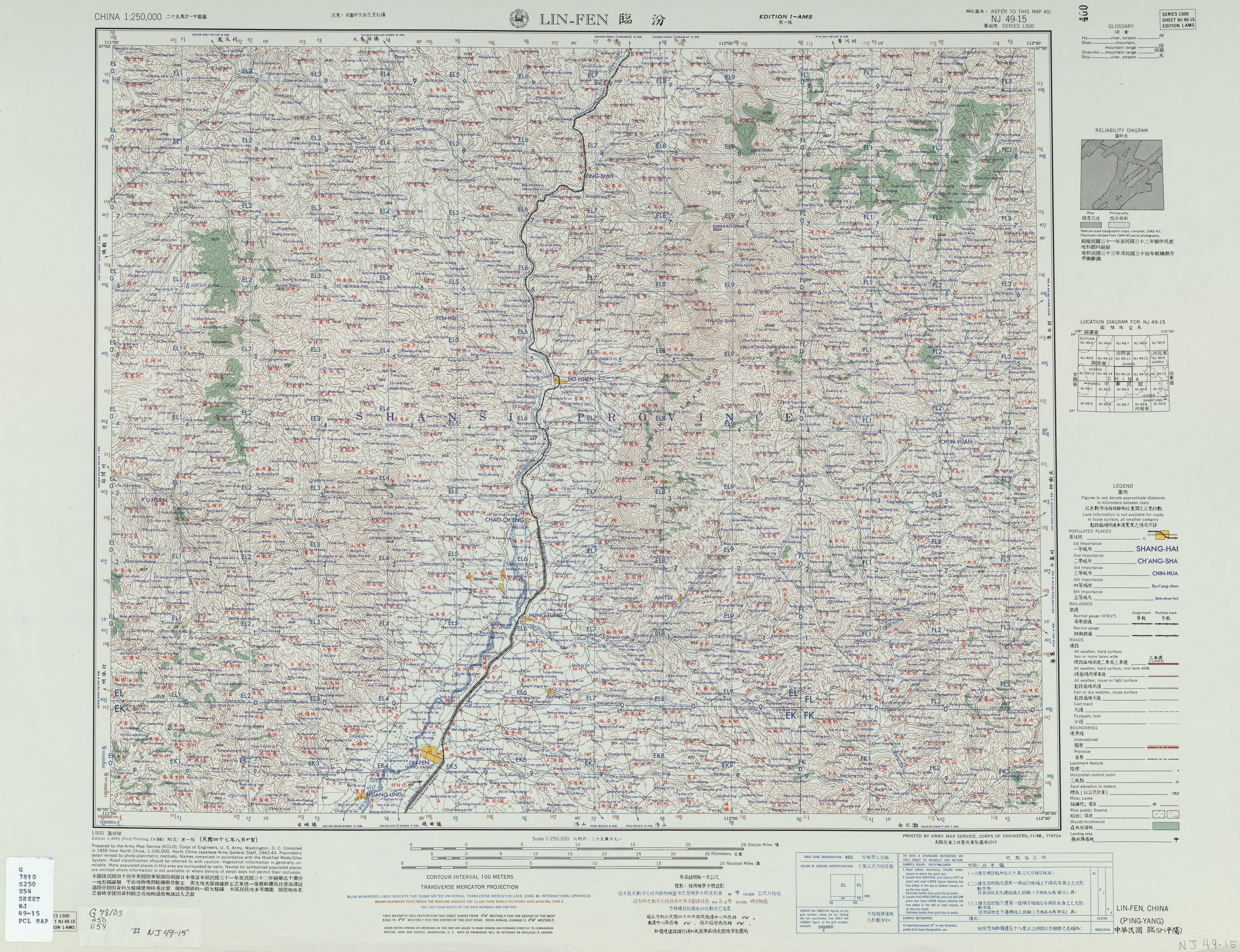
Map including Linfen (labeled as 臨汾(平陽) LIN-FEN (P'ING-YANG)) (AMS, 1955)

Linfen is named for the Fen River. Its former names include Jin, Jinzhou (晋州), and Pingyang (平阳). Linfen was called Pingyang in ancient times and was said to be the ancient capital of Yao in the Tang Dynasty. It belonged to Han in the Spring and Autumn Period, and the Qin and Han Dynasties were Hedong prefectures. In the third year of Jin Yongjia during reign of the emperor Huai, Liu Yuan established his capital here.

== History ==
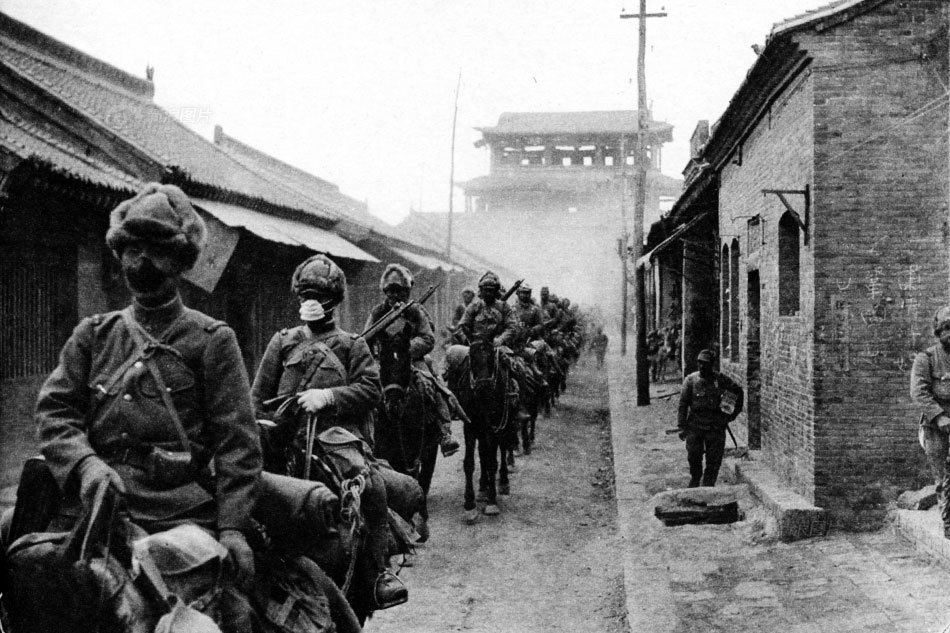
Linfen during the Second Sino-Japanese War, 1938

Chinese archeologists and archaeogeneticists have argued that legendary ruler Yao's capital was located in Linfen, (Note: Xinhua. April 2015.) a confirmation of local legend responsible for the name of the city's Yaodu District. In that sense, Linfen city is the earliest capital of China.

The area was the center of the marchland and duchy of Jin, named for the Jin River (晋水). The duchy collapsed in the 4th century BC but gave its name to a Chinese princely title used as the dynastic name of the Sima clan. Jin Prefecture was centered on the town, which took its name as Jin and Jinzhou. Later, it was renamed Pingyang Commandery, which was also adapted as the name for its chief town. The Xiongnu emperor of Former Zhao Liu Cong made Pingyang his residence in the fourth century. "He kept court at Pingyang in [Shanxi] and ruled over central and southern [Shanxi], over [Shaanxi] (except for the Han basin), northern [Henan] (except for Kaifeng), southern [Hebei], and northern [Shandong]." In the 10th century, the city's walls were considered "fortified beyond approach".

In the 1980s, Linfen was nicknamed "The Modern Fruit and Flower Town".

== Geography ==
Linfen is located in the southwestern part of Shanxi, on the lower reaches of the Fen River, bounded by Changzhi and Jincheng to the east, the Yellow River to the west (which also forms the border with Shaanxi), Jinzhong and Lüliang to the north, and Yuncheng to the south. The prefecture ranges in latitude from 35° 23′ N to 36° 37′ N, spanning 170 kilometres (110 mi), and in longitude from 110° 22′ E to 112° 34′ E, spanning 200 km (120 mi). In all, the city's administrative area, at 20,275 square kilometres (7,828 sq mi), covers 13% of the province's area.

Within its borders Linfen City has a variety of topographical features. It is characterised as having a "U" shape, with its mountains, covering 29.2% of the prefectural area, on all four cardinal directions, a basin, the Linfen Basin (临汾盆地), covering 19.4%, in the middle, and intervening hills, covering 51.4%, in between. In the east, from north to south, are Mount Huo (霍山) and the Zhongtiao Mountains; in the west are the Lüliang Mountains, with elevations mostly above 1,000 metres (3,300 ft). The highest point in the prefecture is the main peak of Mount Huo, at 2,347 metres (7,700 ft), and the lowest is in Xiangning County, at 385 metres (1,263 ft). Important rivers in the area include the Yellow, Fen, Xinshui (昕水河), Qin (沁河), Hui (浍河), E (鄂河), and Qingshui Rivers (清水河).

The whole prefecture-level city features a great variety of terrain. The city itself sits in a basin, which aggravates the pollution.

=== Climate ===
Linfen has a temperate, continental, monsoon-influenced cool semi-arid climate (Köppen BSk), with four distinct seasons. With moderately cold, but dry winters, and hot, somewhat humid summers, rain and heat occur at the same time. The monthly 24-hour average temperature ranges from −1.5 °C (29.3 °F) in January to 27.2 °C (81.0 °F) in July, and the annual mean is 13.8 °C (56.8 °F). The annual precipitation stands at 459.2 millimetres (18.1 in), with close to 70 percent of this total falling from June to September. The frost-free period lasts on average 190 days per year. Extreme temperatures have ranged from −23.1 °C (−9.6 °F) to 42.3 °C (108.1 °F).

Climate data for Linfen, elevation 450 m (1,480 ft), (1991–2020 normals, extremes 1971–2010)
Month	Jan	Feb	Mar	Apr	May	Jun	Jul	Aug	Sep	Oct	Nov	Dec	Year
Record high °C (°F)	15.2 (59.4)	21.5 (70.7)	29.2 (84.6)	36.5 (97.7)	38.4 (101.1)	42.3 (108.1)	41.0 (105.8)	39.2 (102.6)	39.1 (102.4)	32.5 (90.5)	25.0 (77.0)	15.5 (59.9)	42.3 (108.1)
Mean daily maximum °C (°F)	4.7 (40.5)	9.4 (48.9)	16.0 (60.8)	22.7 (72.9)	27.8 (82.0)	32.3 (90.1)	33.0 (91.4)	31.0 (87.8)	26.2 (79.2)	19.9 (67.8)	12.3 (54.1)	5.8 (42.4)	20.1 (68.2)
Daily mean °C (°F)	−1.5 (29.3)	2.8 (37.0)	9.1 (48.4)	15.7 (60.3)	20.9 (69.6)	25.5 (77.9)	27.2 (81.0)	25.5 (77.9)	20.4 (68.7)	13.7 (56.7)	6.2 (43.2)	−0.1 (31.8)	13.8 (56.8)
Mean daily minimum °C (°F)	−6.3 (20.7)	−2.3 (27.9)	3.5 (38.3)	9.5 (49.1)	14.6 (58.3)	19.6 (67.3)	22.4 (72.3)	21.2 (70.2)	15.9 (60.6)	9.0 (48.2)	1.5 (34.7)	−4.5 (23.9)	8.7 (47.6)
Record low °C (°F)	−22.5 (−8.5)	−23.1 (−9.6)	−10.0 (14.0)	−5.0 (23.0)	1.3 (34.3)	8.5 (47.3)	14.7 (58.5)	10.7 (51.3)	2.3 (36.1)	−5.0 (23.0)	−12.8 (9.0)	−17.6 (0.3)	−23.1 (−9.6)
Average precipitation mm (inches)	4.4 (0.17)	6.4 (0.25)	10.2 (0.40)	30.4 (1.20)	39.0 (1.54)	50.5 (1.99)	114.2 (4.50)	84.4 (3.32)	62.8 (2.47)	37.9 (1.49)	16.1 (0.63)	2.9 (0.11)	459.2 (18.07)
Average precipitation days (≥ 0.1 mm)	2.2	2.8	3.9	5.2	6.9	8.2	10.4	9.1	8.9	6.3	4.5	1.9	70.3
Average snowy days	3.0	2.7	0.9	0.2	0	0	0	0	0	0	1.3	2.2	10.3
Average relative humidity (%)	54	52	48	50	52	54	65	69	69	68	64	57	59
Mean monthly sunshine hours	121.1	141.4	184.8	215.5	235.4	219.4	210.3	197.2	163.7	153.8	130.6	117.3	2,090.5
Percentage possible sunshine	39	46	49	55	54	50	48	48	45	45	43	39	47
Source 1: China Meteorological Administration
Source 2: Weather China

=== Pollution ===
China's rapid industrialization and urbanization beginning in the 1990s (see reform and opening up) led to increased energy demand causing a dramatic increase in the price of coal. This led to a rapid expansion of loosely regulated private mines. Mining, cooking, smelting and other heavy industries which developed around the city have led to catastrophic environmental damage.

In 2006, the Blacksmith Institute included Linfen in its annual "10 worst" report, calling the city the most polluted city in China. It has also been listed as one of the world's ten dirtiest cities by the Popular Science website. The city has ranked at the bottom of the World Bank's air quality rankings.

From its low point, in 2004, with only fifteen days out of the year with an acceptable level of air pollution, the environmental situation has improved. After a series of negative reports on the extreme level of pollution in the city, efforts were made to clean up Linfen. Substandard mines were closed. Coal trucks were kept from entering the city, resulting in much less coal dust. The city has also switched much of its heating source from coal to gas. 197 large coal-fired boilers and more than 600 smaller boilers were decommissioned. As of 2007, 85% of population used natural gas rather than coal for their heating. The State Environmental Protection Agency (SEPA) has forced many of the less-efficient smaller factories to close and enforced stricter standards for larger factories including mandating the installation of sulfur scrubbers.

Since 2006, the government has taken a series of measures to modify industrial structure and economic development mode. Relevant policies was issued such as emission thresholds of industrial pollution. Over the last few years the Ministry of Environmental Protection has been closely monitoring Linfen's environment conditions. While the China Youth Daily reported in 2014 that Linfen was experiencing the great change from the "most polluted city" to "model city of environmental protection", other sources suggest that little progress has been made in combating pollution. In 2018, the Chinese government openly criticized the city's failure to meet pollution targets, and a 2019 report by the Chinese Ministry of Ecology and Environment found that the city's air pollution was the worst among the 168 cities the ministry monitored. Following the report, the city's government ordered further pollution controls for the city's industry.

== Administrative divisions ==
The prefecture-level city of Linfen is divided in one district, two cities and fourteen counties. The information here presented uses the metric system and data from 2010 Census.

Map
#	English name	Simplified	Traditional	Pinyin	Area	Population	Density
1	Yaodu District	尧都区	堯都區	Yáodū Qū	1,316	944,050	717
2	Houma City	侯马市	侯馬市	Hóumǎ Shì	274	240,005	876
3	Huozhou City	霍州市		Huòzhōu Shì	765	282,907	370
4	Quwo County	曲沃县	曲沃縣	Qǔwò Xiàn	438	237,033	541
5	Yicheng County	翼城县	翼城縣	Yìchéng Xiàn	1,163	311,471	268
6	Xiangfen County	襄汾县	襄汾縣	Xiāngfén Xiàn	1,304	442,614	339
7	Hongtong County	洪洞县	洪洞縣	Hóngtóng Xiàn	1,563	733,421	469
8	Gu County	古县	古縣	Gǔ Xiàn	1,193	91,798	77
9	Anze County	安泽县	安澤縣	Ānzé Xiàn	1,965	82,012	42
10	Fushan County	浮山县	浮山縣	Fúshān Xiàn	946	127,831	135
11	Ji County	吉县	吉縣	Jí Xiàn	1,777	106,407	60
12	Xiangning County	乡宁县	鄉寧縣	Xiāngníng Xiàn	2,029	233,162	115
13	Pu County	蒲县	蒲縣	Pú Xiàn	1,508	107,339	71
14	Daning County	大宁县	大寧縣	Dàníng Xiàn	967	64,501	67
15	Yonghe County	永和县	永和縣	Yǒnghé Xiàn	1,219	63,649	52
16	Xi County	隰县	隰縣	Xí Xiàn	1,415	103,617	73
17	Fenxi County	汾西县	汾西縣	Fénxī Xiàn	880	144,795	165

== Tourism ==
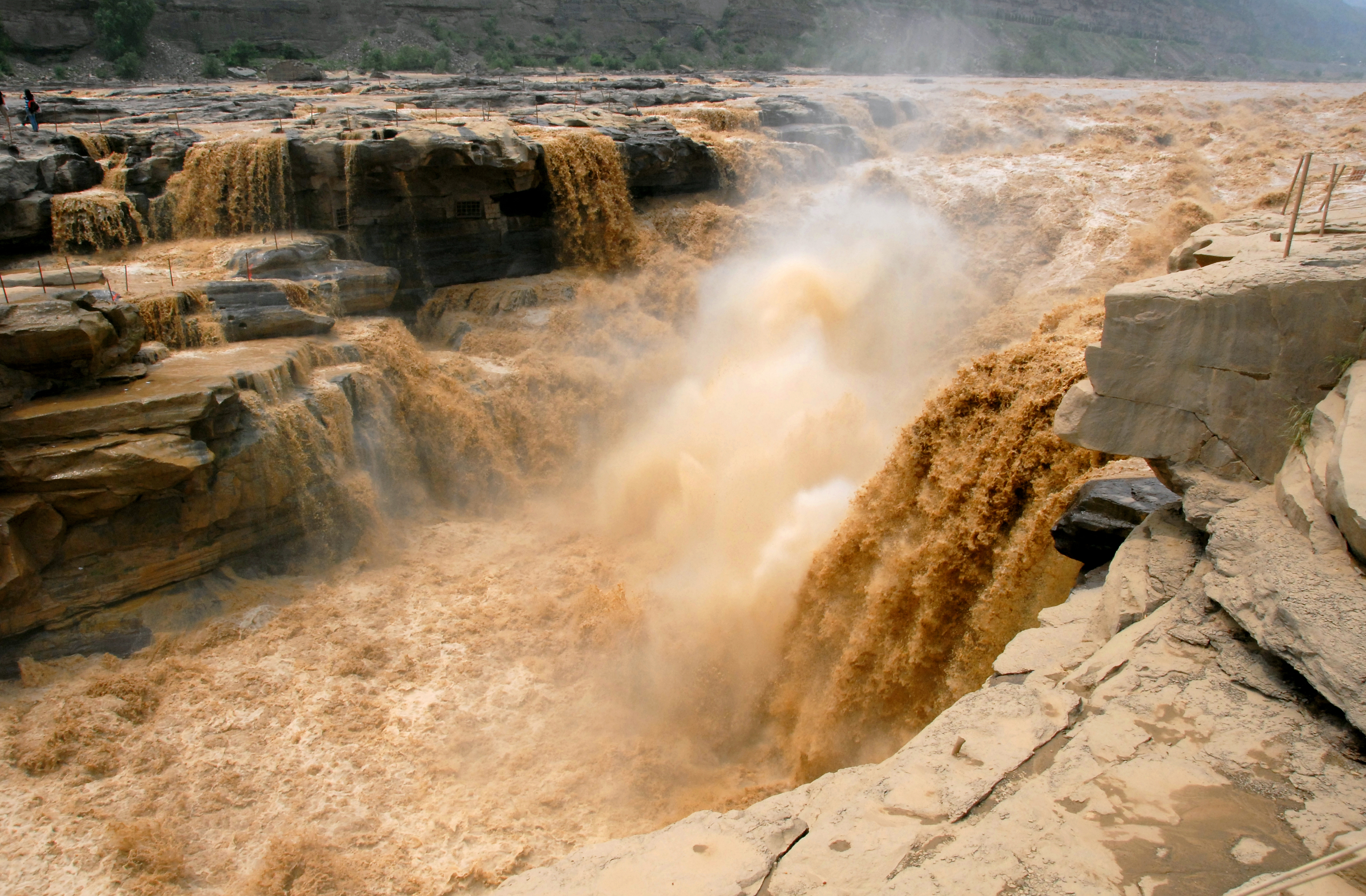
The Hukou Waterfall

Linfen prefecture is home to several notable tourist attractions including the Hukou Waterfall which is the largest waterfall on the Yellow River and the second largest in China. Hukou Waterfall is located 150 km (93 mi) west of Linfen city in Jinshan Gorge.

Other attractions are mostly located in Hongtong county. Most notable among these is Guangsheng Temple, built in 147 CE. Located in the upper Guangsheng temple is the Feihong Pagoda (飞虹塔), the largest and best preserved glazed Chinese pagoda. Also in Hongtong county is the Susan Prison (苏三监狱), a restored Ming dynasty prison made famous by the Peking opera play Yu Tang Chun (玉堂春). It is China's oldest surviving prison. Dahuaishu Ancestor Memorial Garden is a major shown for the mandatory population migration (aka Hongwu great migration, 洪武大移民) in the early Ming Dynasty.

== Demographics ==
Linfen recorded a population of approximately 4,508,400 people as of 2019, an increase of 80,100 from 2018. The city reported 2,414,700 urban residents, and 2,093,700 rural residents, giving the city a 53.56% urbanization rate. There are 28 ethnic minorities in Linfen with a population exceeding 10,000 people: the Hui, the Manchu, the Tujia, Mongols, the Miao, the Zhuang, Koreans, the Yi, the Buyi, the Bai, Uyghurs, the Mulao, the She, Tibetans, the Li, the Dong, the Yao, Tajiks, the Gelao, the Daur, the Lahu, the Wa, the Hani, the Tu, the Xibo, the Lisu, the Qiang, and the Jingpo.

At the end of 2023 and the beginning of 2024, the permanent population will be 3.8872 million.

== Economy ==
As of 2019, the city reported a GDP of 145.26 billion Renminbi. Linfen's primary sector makes up 7.1% of the city's GDP, the secondary sector contributes 43.3% of the city's GDP, and the tertiary sector makes up 49.6% of the city's GDP. The city's GDP in 2023 will be 231.25 billion yuan.

=== Industry ===
Linfen has rich mineral resources including coal, iron ore, copper, and lead. Hedong Coal Field, Huoxi Coal Field and Qinshui Coal Field together comprise 62.9 billion tons of coal reserves. Iron ore reserves exceed 420 million tons. Coal mining and dressing, coking, metallurgy, non-ferrous metal smelting, and chemicals are the principle industries.

After a World Bank report in 2006 called Linfen "the most polluted city in the world", the local government began closing a number of mines and factories, costing the city's economy $300 million in 2007 alone. A number of industries also refitted their facilities to track and reduce pollution. The city's economy stagnated in the following years.

== Transportation ==
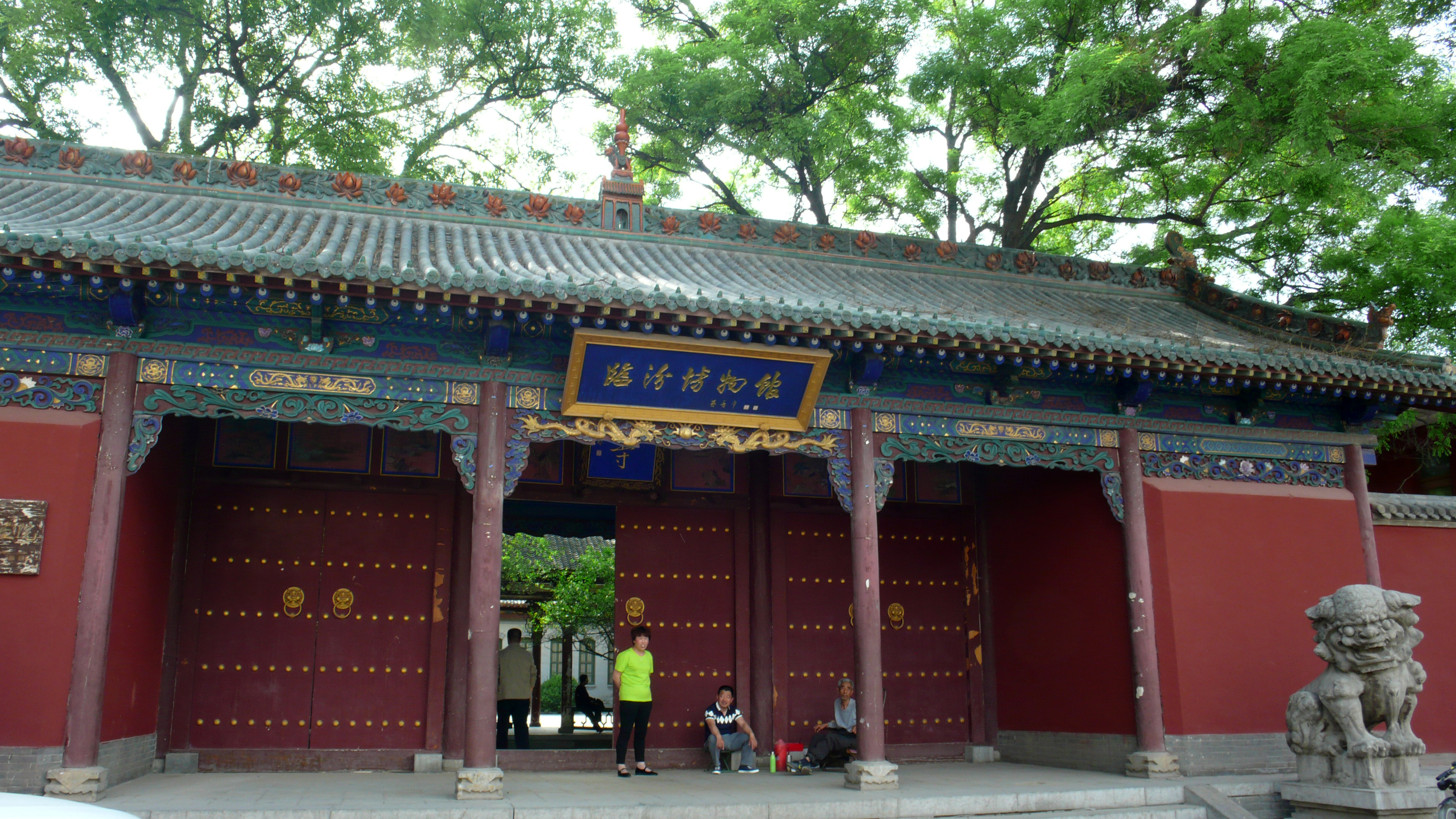
Linfen Museum

=== Air ===
Linfen Yaodu Airport, in Yaodu district, was built in 1958 and closed in 1965. The airport has been under renovation since September 2010 and started operation in January 2016.

=== Railway ===
Linfen railway station, in Yaodu district, was built in 1935 on the important southern Tongpu railway.Linfen Railway Station is located on Yingchun North Street, Linfen City, Shanxi Province. Founded in 1935. It is 274 kilometers away from Taiyuan Station and 254 kilometers away from Huashan Station (southern section of Tongpu Railway).

Linfen West railway station, in Yaodu district, was built in 2014. It is on the Datong–Xi'an high-speed railway. From this station, passengers can go to Beijing, Xi'an, Taiyuan and Shijiazhuang directly.

=== Road ===
- China National Highway 108
- China National Highway 309
- G5 Beijing–Kunming Expressway
- G22 Qingdao–Lanzhou Expressway

== Education ==
- Shanxi Normal University (山西师范大学)
- Shanxi Institute of Electronic Science and Technology (山西电子科技学院）

== Notable people ==
- Linjie Deng (born 1992) - multimedia artist
- Chai Jing, Chinese writer and host.
