= Yicheng County =

Yicheng County 翼城县
- County
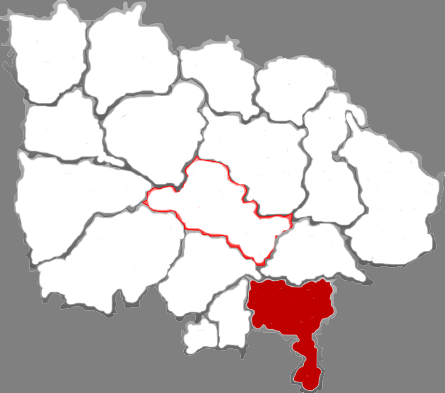
- Yicheng in Linfen

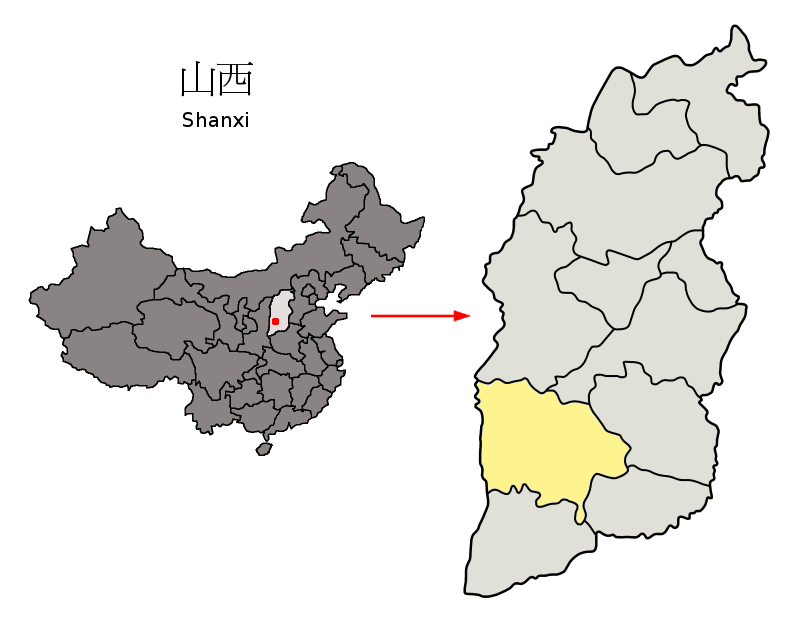
- Linfen in Shanxi

- Location of the seat in Shanxi
- Coordinates (Yicheng County government): 35°44′23″N 111°43′08″E
- Country: People's Republic of China
- Province: Shanxi
- Prefecture-level city: Linfen
- County Seat: Tangxing

Area
  - County: 1,168 km^{2} (451 sq mi)

Population (2019)
  - County: 323,517
  - Density: 277.0/km^{2} (717.4/sq mi)
  - Urban: 137,500
- Time zone: UTC+8 (China Standard)
- Postal code: 043500
- Website: www.yicheng.gov.cn

Yicheng County (simplified Chinese: 翼城县; traditional Chinese: 翼城縣; pinyin: Yìchéng Xiàn) is a county in the prefecture-level city of Linfen, in the south of Shanxi Province, China. The county spans an area of 1,168 square kilometres (451 sq mi), and is home to 323,517 people as of 2019.

== Geography ==
Yicheng County is located in southern Shanxi Province, straddling both sides of the Hui River. The county's elevation ranges from 473 to 1,556 meters in height.

== History ==
Yicheng County was the site of Jiang (t 絳, s 绛), which served for a time as the capital of the state of Jin during the Zhou.

== Climate ==
Climate data for Yicheng, elevation 585 m (1,919 ft), (1991–2020 normals, extremes 1981–2010)
Month	Jan	Feb	Mar	Apr	May	Jun	Jul	Aug	Sep	Oct	Nov	Dec	Year
Record high °C (°F)	16.1 (61.0)	23.1 (73.6)	28.3 (82.9)	35.5 (95.9)	37.9 (100.2)	40.2 (104.4)	40.5 (104.9)	38.7 (101.7)	38.3 (100.9)	31.4 (88.5)	25.5 (77.9)	16.4 (61.5)	40.5 (104.9)
Mean daily maximum °C (°F)	4.1 (39.4)	8.7 (47.7)	15.0 (59.0)	21.7 (71.1)	26.8 (80.2)	31.4 (88.5)	32.2 (90.0)	30.3 (86.5)	25.6 (78.1)	19.3 (66.7)	12.0 (53.6)	5.5 (41.9)	19.4 (66.9)
Daily mean °C (°F)	−1.7 (28.9)	2.4 (36.3)	8.5 (47.3)	15.1 (59.2)	20.3 (68.5)	25.0 (77.0)	26.6 (79.9)	24.9 (76.8)	20.0 (68.0)	13.5 (56.3)	6.1 (43.0)	−0.3 (31.5)	13.4 (56.1)
Mean daily minimum °C (°F)	−5.7 (21.7)	−2.0 (28.4)	3.5 (38.3)	9.4 (48.9)	14.4 (57.9)	19.3 (66.7)	22.0 (71.6)	20.7 (69.3)	15.7 (60.3)	9.2 (48.6)	2.0 (35.6)	−4.2 (24.4)	8.7 (47.6)
Record low °C (°F)	−17.7 (0.1)	−13.9 (7.0)	−11.0 (12.2)	−2.6 (27.3)	2.9 (37.2)	7.2 (45.0)	15.2 (59.4)	12.0 (53.6)	3.7 (38.7)	−4.4 (24.1)	−13.3 (8.1)	−19.6 (−3.3)	−19.6 (−3.3)
Average precipitation mm (inches)	6.2 (0.24)	7.9 (0.31)	11.0 (0.43)	32.9 (1.30)	42.8 (1.69)	54.8 (2.16)	112.7 (4.44)	88.5 (3.48)	66.7 (2.63)	43.3 (1.70)	20.8 (0.82)	4.4 (0.17)	492 (19.37)
Average precipitation days (≥ 0.1 mm)	3.0	3.2	4.4	5.8	7.5	8.8	10.8	9.7	8.9	7.3	5.1	2.8	77.3
Average snowy days	3.9	3.7	1.3	0.2	0	0	0	0	0	0	1.5	2.9	13.5
Average relative humidity (%)	54	52	50	51	53	55	66	70	70	67	64	56	59
Mean monthly sunshine hours	160.1	162.6	199.9	228.3	248.5	234.2	231.8	208.6	172.8	172.2	162.1	163.6	2,344.7
Percentage possible sunshine	51	52	54	58	57	54	53	50	47	50	53	54	53
Source: China Meteorological Administration

== Government ==
=== Administrative divisions ===
Yicheng County has jurisdiction over 6 towns and 4 townships, which are further divided into 151 administrative villages. Yicheng's six towns are Tangxing (唐兴镇), Nanliang (南梁镇), Lizhai (里寨镇), Longhua (隆化镇), Qiaoshang (桥上镇), and Xirun (西阎镇). Yicheng's four townships are Zhongwei Township (中卫乡), Nantang Township (南唐乡), Wangzhuang Township (王庄乡), and Jiaodi Township (浇底乡). The county's government is seated in Tangxing.

=== County budget ===
In 2019, the county government's fiscal revenue was 331.96 million yuan, of which, 211.66 million yuan came from tax revenue.

Yicheng County 2019 Budget
Category	Expenditure (million RMB)	Percent change from 2018	Percent of total 2019 Budget
Education	350.62	+1.6%	16.39%
Agriculture, forestry, and water	323.7	-13.9%	15.13%
General public service	164.73	+6.6%	7.70%
Urban and rural community affairs	150.3	-7.0%	7.03%
Public safety	94.42	+2.9%	4.41%
Culture, sports, and media	39.75	+9.8%	1.86%
Medical, health, and family planning	35.736	+24.8%	1.67%
Social security and employment	32.135	+2.7%	1.50%
Energy conservation and environmental protection	10.729	-1.7%	0.50%
Science and technology	4.56	+85.4%	0.21%
Other	932.22	N/A	43.58%
TOTAL	2,138.9	+5.4%	

== Demographics ==
As of 2019, the county's permanent population was 323,517, of which 137,500 were urban residents. In 2019, the county recorded a birth rate of 8.75 per 1,000, and a death rate of 5.9 per 1,000, resulting in a natural growth rate of 2.85 per 1,000.

== Economy ==
Yicheng reported a GDP of 7.14 billion yuan in 2019, a 4.1% increase from 2018, but relatively unchanged from its 2015 GDP of 7.07 billion yuan. Retail sales totaled 3.82 billion yuan the same year. The county has an average disposable income of 19,188 yuan, which is 32,404 yuan among urban residents and 12,796 yuan among rural residents.

=== Agriculture ===
Yicheng County has 40,173 hectares of cropland, as of 2019, of which, 38,825 hectares were devoted to grain production, mostly corn and wheat, producing 186,701 tons of grain.

=== Industry ===
Industrial enterprises in Yicheng County produced 3.531 million tons of raw coal, 344,000 tons of pig iron, and 36.21 million kWh of electricity in 2019. The county primarily relies on coal for electricity production, but other sources of power generation are becoming more prominent.

== Transportation ==
- Houma–Yueshan Railway
