= Zhongtiao Mountains =

Mountain range in Shanxi, China

Coordinates: 35°06′56″N 111°46′21″E

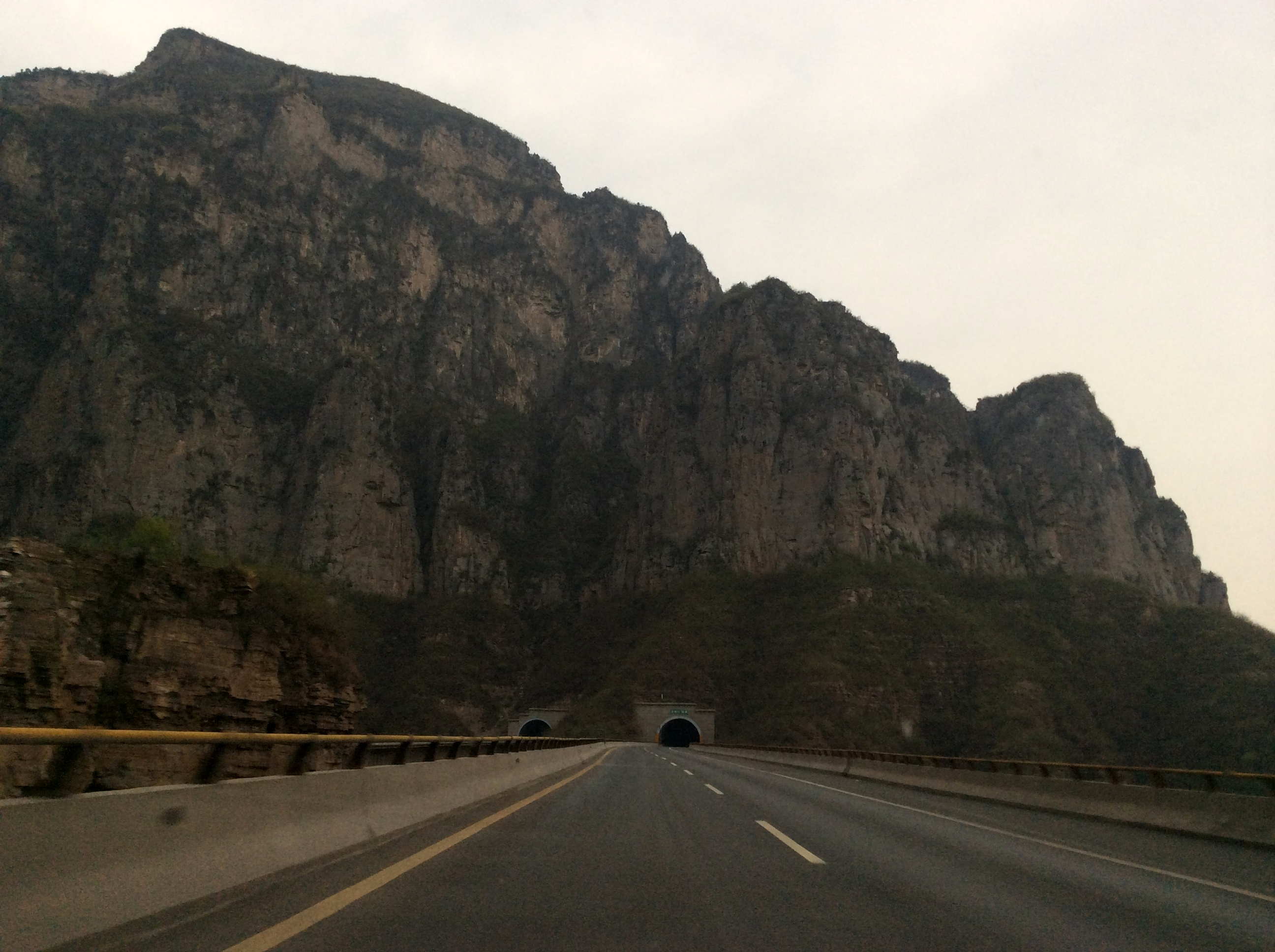
The G55 Erenhot–Guangzhou Expressway through the Zhongtiao Mountains

The Zhongtiao Mountains (simplified Chinese: 中条山; traditional Chinese: 中條山; pinyin: Zhōngtiáo Shān) are a major mountain range located in the south of China’s Shanxi Province. Running from north east to south west the range connects with the Taihang Mountains to the east, overlooks the Yellow River to the south and faces the Fen River valley to the north west. To the west the mountains are separated from the Yellow River by the Qin Mountains.
The range extends for approximately 160 kilometres (99 mi) with the highest peak rising to 2,321 metres (7,615 ft) above sea level.

During the Second Sino-Japanese War (1937–1945) the Japanese army advanced west into Shaanxi and encircled this area many times in what was known as the Zhongtiao Mountains Campaign.

The Zhongtiao Mountains were one of the birth places of Taoism in Northern China and an important religious site. In ancient times the area was also a major center for copper mining and is today one of the operational bases of Zhongtiaoshan Non-ferrous Metals Group Co., Ltd, one of China’s largest metal processing companies.
