= Narrow-gauge railways in China =

The gauge for most of the China national railway network is standard gauge. Currently, in the national railway network, only the 1,000 mm (3 ft 3 3/8 in) metre gauge Kunming–Haiphong railway uses narrow gauge. In addition, there are some industrial lines still using narrow gauge, mostly 2 ft 6 in (762 mm) narrow gauge or 600 mm (1 ft 11 5/8 in) narrow gauge. As of 2003, 600+ km narrow-gauge railways, 50000+ km standard gauge railways, and 9.4 km broad gauge railways were in use in mainland China.

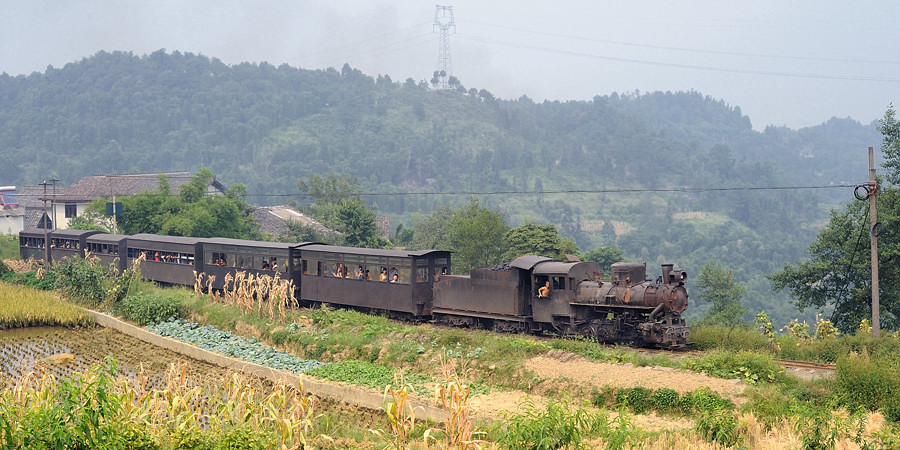
The 2 ft 6 in (762 mm) gauge Jiayang Coal Railway in Sichuan Province.

== Operational narrow-gauge railways ==
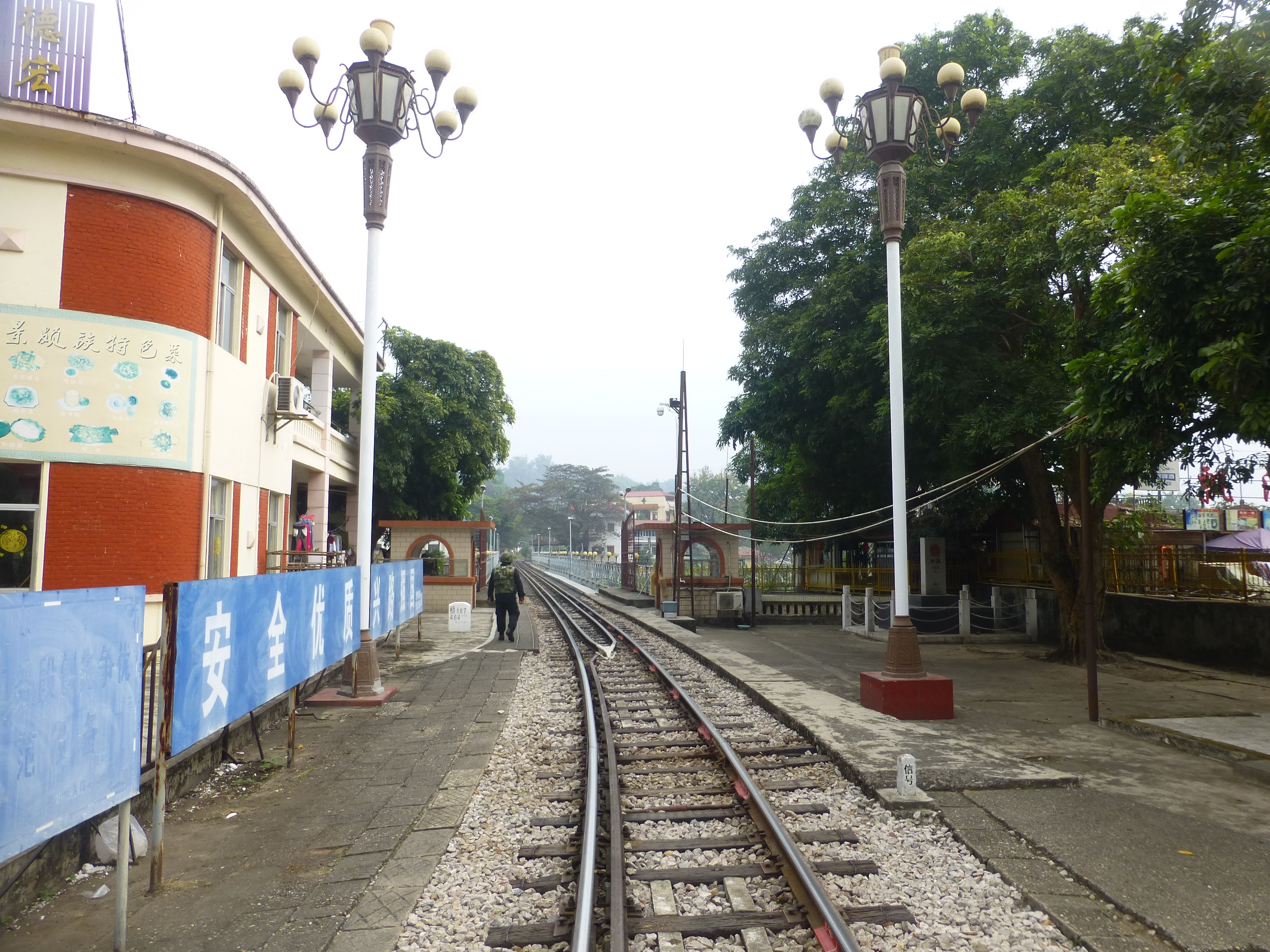
The tracks of the Kunming–Haiphong railway in Hekou Town

=== Kunming–Hekou Railway ===
The 1,000 mm (3 ft 3 3/8 in) metre gauge Kunming–Hekou railway (previously known as the "Sino-Vietnamese Railway") was part of the Kunming–Haiphong railway built by French colonists between Vietnam and China. Due to landslides and the opening of the new standard-gauge Kunming-Yuxi-Hekou railway, this meter-gauge line is now inoperative for passengers (except for a small section within Greater Kunming) but does have freight services.

This railway, opened in 1910, had a 600 mm (1 ft 11 5/8 in) gauge branch line from Caoba to Shiping which operated 0-10-0 tender locos built by Baldwin Locomotive Works. This branch has been later converted to 1,000 mm gauge as well, and presently (2016) is used by tourist excursion trains around Jianshui

The meter gauge section was originally administered in more or less the same way as the Indochinese networks, and it was physically possible for through trains to be run from Kunming to Saigon, as meter gauge was used in both these countries. During the Japanese occupation Japanese National Railways Class 9600 2-8-0 locomotives were shipped to aid their invasion. After the completion of the "death railway" in Thailand, it would have been possible for a time for through traffic to Burma (if not for a gap between Saigon and Phnom Penh, in Cambodia). This is now impossible as sections of this railway have been destroyed during the conflicts since World War II.

=== Industrial railways ===
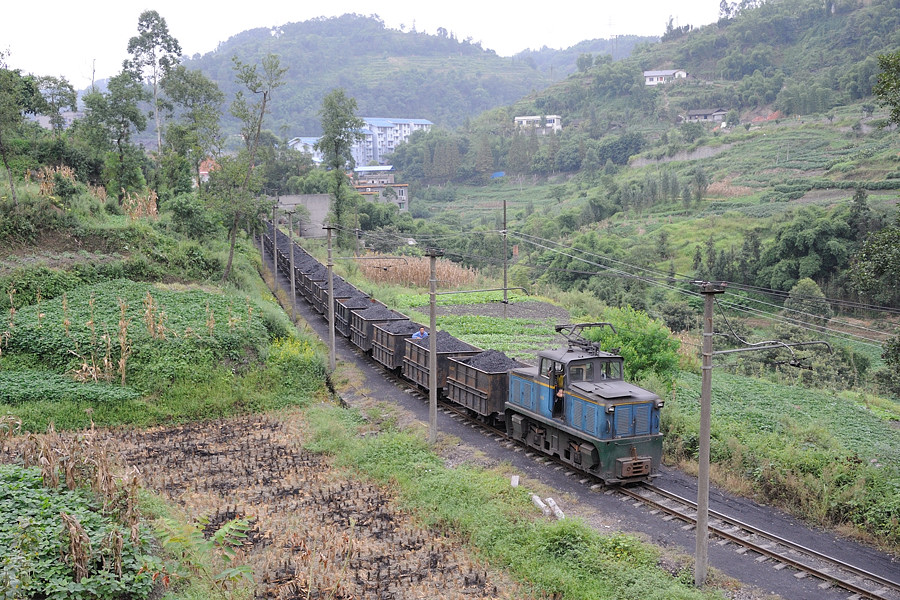
Jiayang Coal Railway, a narrow-gauge railway in Qianwei County, Sichuan Province used to haul coal.

In Manchuria, lumber industries built narrow-gauge railways into the forests. These used Russian and Japanese locomotives, copied from Soviet or Eastern European designs. Now most of them have disappeared. These railways mostly use a gauge of 2 ft 6 in (762 mm).

== 3 ft 6 in (1,067 mm) gauge railways ==
Several 3 ft 6 in (1,067 mm) gauge railways were constructed by the Japanese.

=== Manchuria ===
There were several 3 ft 6 in (1,067 mm) gauge military railways in Manchuria during the Russo-Japanese War. These Japanese military railways – which includes a section converted from the 1,520 mm (4 ft 11 27/32 in) Russian gauge Chinese Eastern Railway – used Japanese National Railways stock and were quickly converted back to standard gauge after the war to facilitate through traffic with the British controlled Peking-Mukden (Beijing-Shenyang) Railway, which was standard gauge. As a result, the South Manchurian Railway, a creation of the Japanese Kwantung Army, was standard gauge.

=== Hainan ===
In 1941–43, during the Japanese occupation of Hainan, several 3 ft 6 in (1,067 mm) gauge rail lines were constructed in the western part of the island. Of particular importance for the Japanese war effort was the line connecting the iron ore mine in Shilu with the Basuo Harbor.

The lines fell into disrepair and were abandoned after the battle of Hainan to the Communists in April 1950. They were rebuilt and converted to the standard gauge between the mid-1950s and 1985; now they form part of the Hainan Western Ring Railway.

== Metre-gauge railways ==
Metre-gauge railways were popular in China in several regions before the 1949 establishment of PRC. Several lines were constructed, with the intention to join all the railways, forming a new sphere of influence for the French which never materialized.

=== Kunming Hekou Railway ===
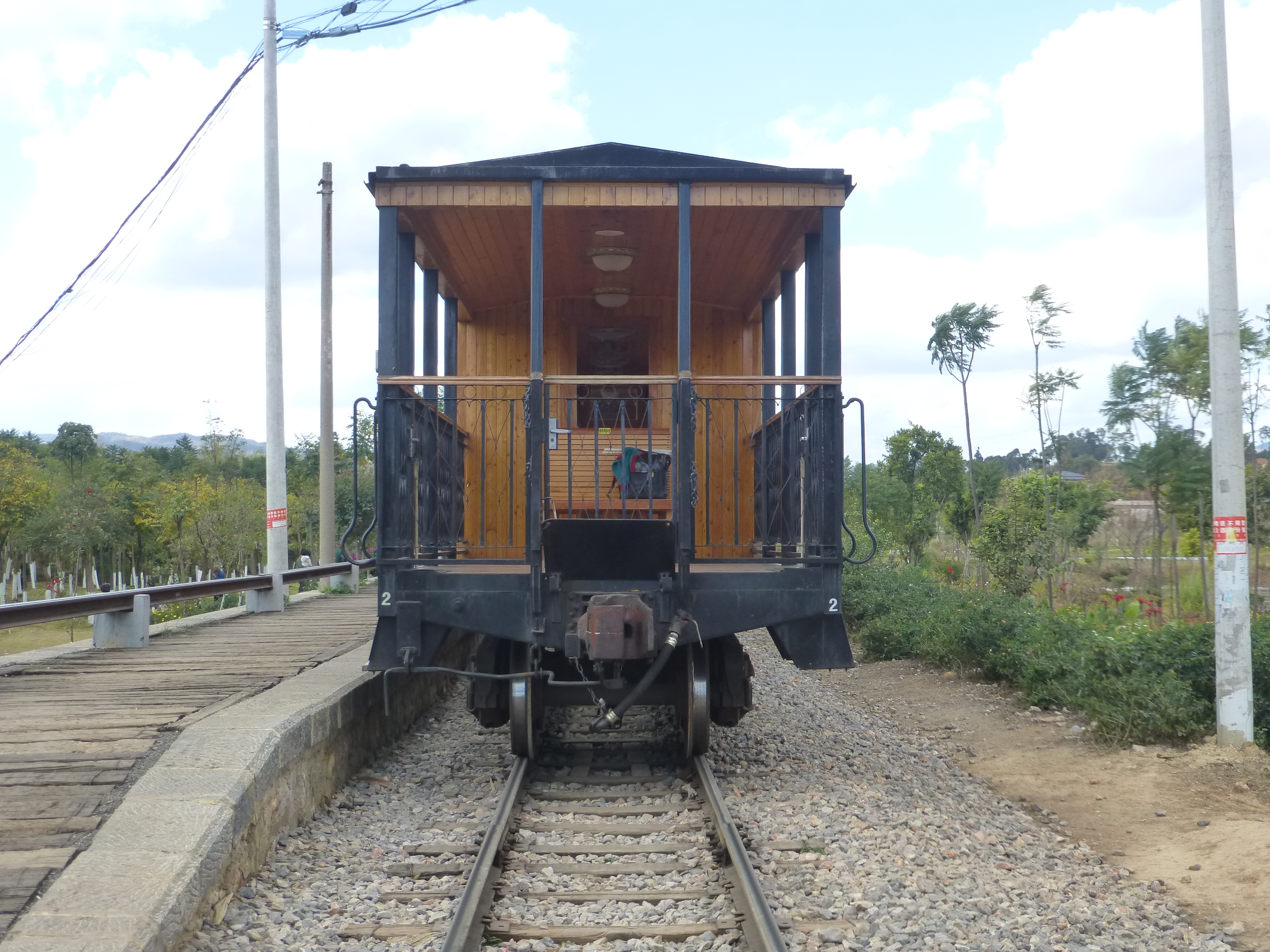
"Jianshui Old Train", an excursion train on the meter-gauge line in Jianshui County

The 466 km Chinese section of the French built Kunming–Haiphong railway, and a few surviving branches. The system also includes a short new meter-gauge connector to the new standard-gauge Hekou North Station.

=== Shijiazhuang to Taiyuan ===
The railway from Shijiazhuang to Taiyuan (sometimes known as Zhengtai Railway) was opened at the turn of the 20th century. It was French and Belgian controlled, since it was a feeder of the Belgian controlled Jinghan railway. To minimise costs, it was built to the same 1,000 mm (3 ft 3 3/8 in) metre gauge of the Kunming–Hekou railway, with the hope that the latter could be extended to Shanxi province. The railway was built to the nature of a light railway and used rolling stock built in France and Belgium.

=== Datong to Pukou ===
The Railway from Datong to Pukou (Tong Pu Railway), opened in 1933, which was funded by the Japanese and controlled by the Shanxi warlord, Yan Xishan, and which connected the Shijiazhuang–Taiyuan Railway at Taiyuan, had to be built to metre gauge as well. The Datong–Pukou Railway used rolling stock built by Japanese companies, even withdrawn old "Japanese National Railways" or "Imperial Taiwan Railway" stock (which is based on the 3 ft 6 in (1,067 mm) gauge Liu Mingchuan's railway' in Qing dynasty). When the Japanese invaded the Shanxi and Hebei provinces during the Sino-Japanese War, these two railways were converted to standard gauge.

=== Yunnan Burma Railway ===
Construction of the 1,000 mm (3 ft 3 3/8 in) metre gauge Yunnan Burma line started in 1941 but had to be aborted due to Japanese advances, and has never been completed.

=== Other ===
In some rural or suburban areas, metre-gauge railways were built to transport agricultural produce. Such was the case of two light railways east of Pudong, Shanghai. They were isolated systems using small tank engines, like 4-4-2Ts. Later, experiments were made with gasoline railcar and trailer sets having Ford engines. They were closed in the 1950s and 1970s respectively and replaced by bus services.

== 2 ft 6 in (762 mm) gauge railways ==
In some provinces 2 ft 6 in (762 mm) gauge light railways were used for mines and prominently in Henan and Sichuan they were used for rural transportation. Most of them were built in an era when most European light railways had started to dwindle in favour of roads. The Shibanxi Railway in Sichuan is being preserved as China's first heritage steam railway. The Bagou–Shixi Railway is still operating with steam locomotives, partly for heritage purposes.

| Province | Railway |
|---|---|
| Guangdong Province | Da Tang Railway; Gaoyao Coal Railway; Hetou Railway; Lishan Iron Ore Mine Railway; Meixian Provincial Railway (with branches); Yingde Forestry Railway; Yingde Mineral Railway; Yunfu Pyrites Mine Railway |
| Heilongjiang province | Weihe Forest Railway in Weihe, Shangzhi, a branch of Harbin–Suifenhe Railway, demolished in 2003 |
| Henan Province | Yuzhou–Dancheng Railway |
| Hunan Province | Chenjia Railway; Mine near Hulukou, 5 km, electrified with Overhead line |
| Jiangxi province | Ganzhou Timber Railway; Southern Jiangxi Forest Railway |
| Shanghai | Woosung Road (defunct) |
| Shanxi Province | Datong–Puzhou Railway (converted to standard gauge) (operating) |
| Sichuan Province | Gansui - Baiyan; Pengzhou–Baisuihe; Jiayang Coal Railway, Shibanxi–Huangchungjing (Jiayang Power Company) Converted from 600 mm (1 ft 11 5/8 in) |

== 600 mm (1 ft 11 5/8 in) gauge railways ==
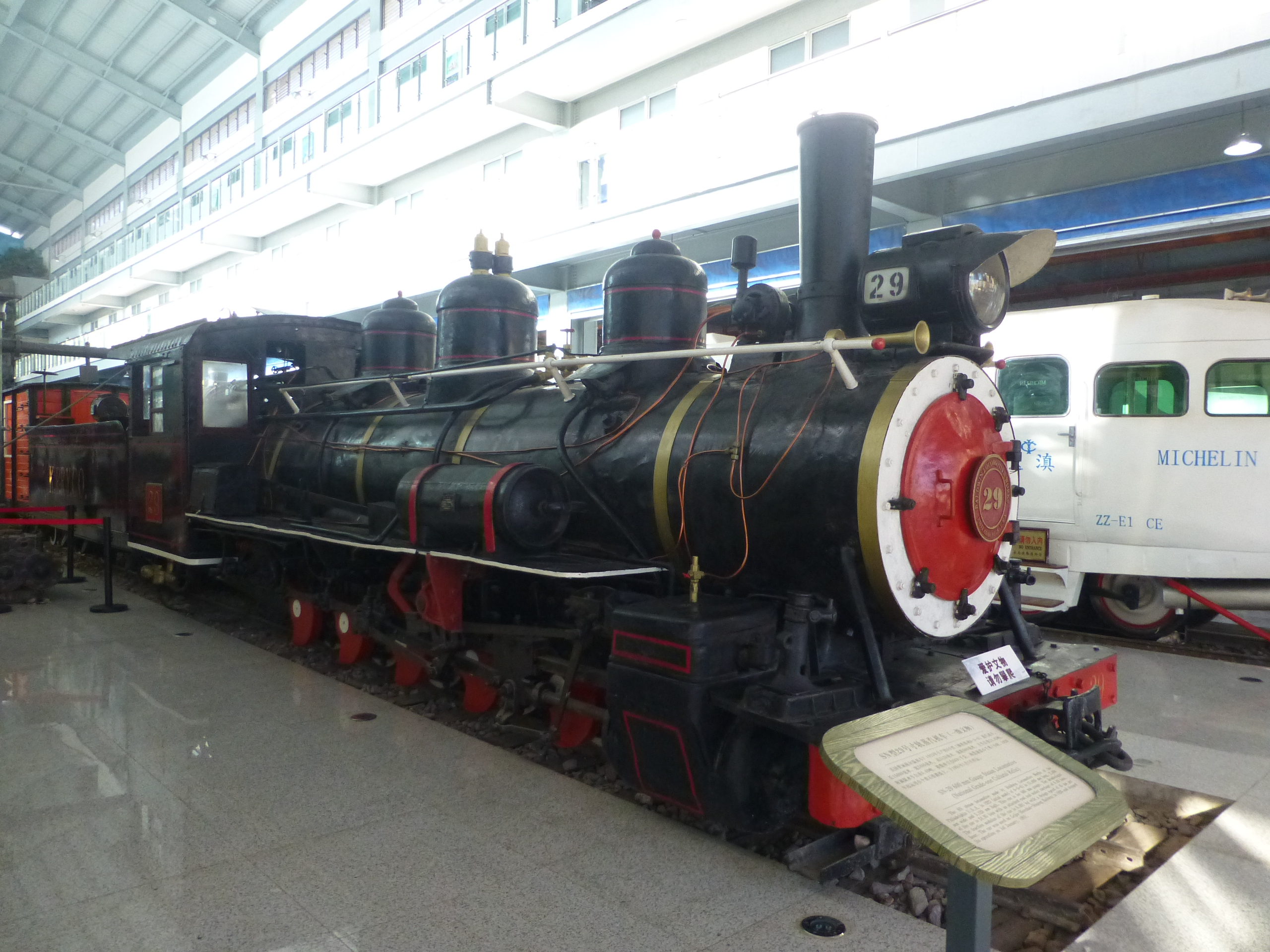
A 600 mm Baldwin Locomotive Works locomotive from the Gebishi Railway

| Province | Railway |
|---|---|
| Guangdong Province | Chi Ni Limestone Railway |
| Hunan Province | Small mine railway near Guiyang; Mine near Hulukou, 5 km, inside mine, electrified with Overhead line |
| Liaoning Province | Coal tramways round Nanpiao |
| Sichuan Province | Hongbitan coal mine near Shenzhenjiao, loading line and disused spoil line; Two coalmines (battery electric and cable) at Baiyan; Jianghe Coal Railway; Shibanxi Railway, converted to 2 ft 6 in (762 mm) gauge |
| Yunnan province | Gebishi Railway (partially converted to 1,000 mm, partially defunct) |

== 500 mm (19 3/4 in) gauge railways ==
Sichuan Province

- Hongbitan coalmine near Shenzhenjiao, main coal mine railway line.

== 400 mm (15 3/4 in) gauge railways ==
Sichuan Province

- Coal mine (cable and hand tramming) at Shuangxianzi between Guanzhou and Meisuling.

== Other ==
=== Arxan Forrest Railway ===
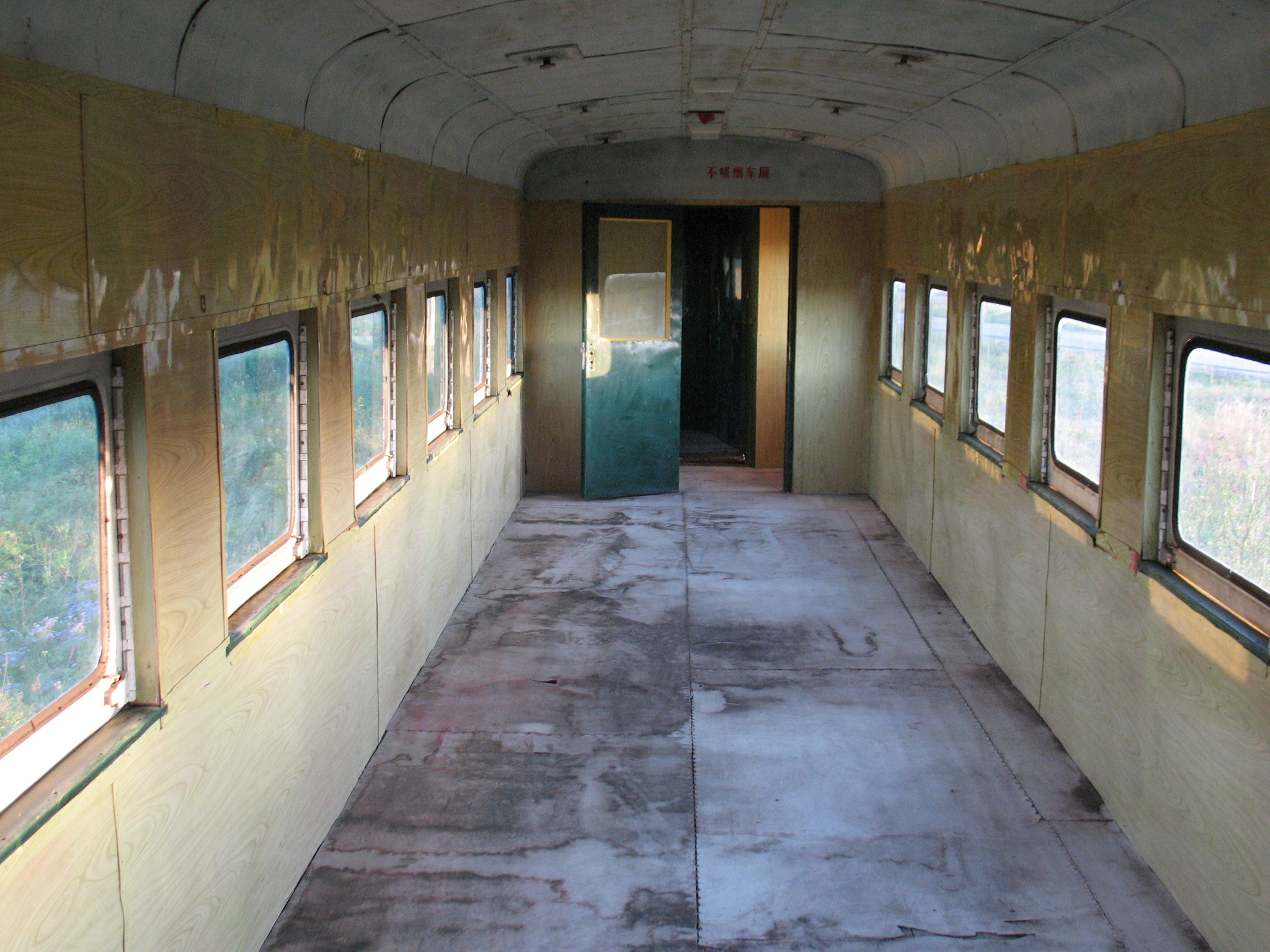
Inside the carriage

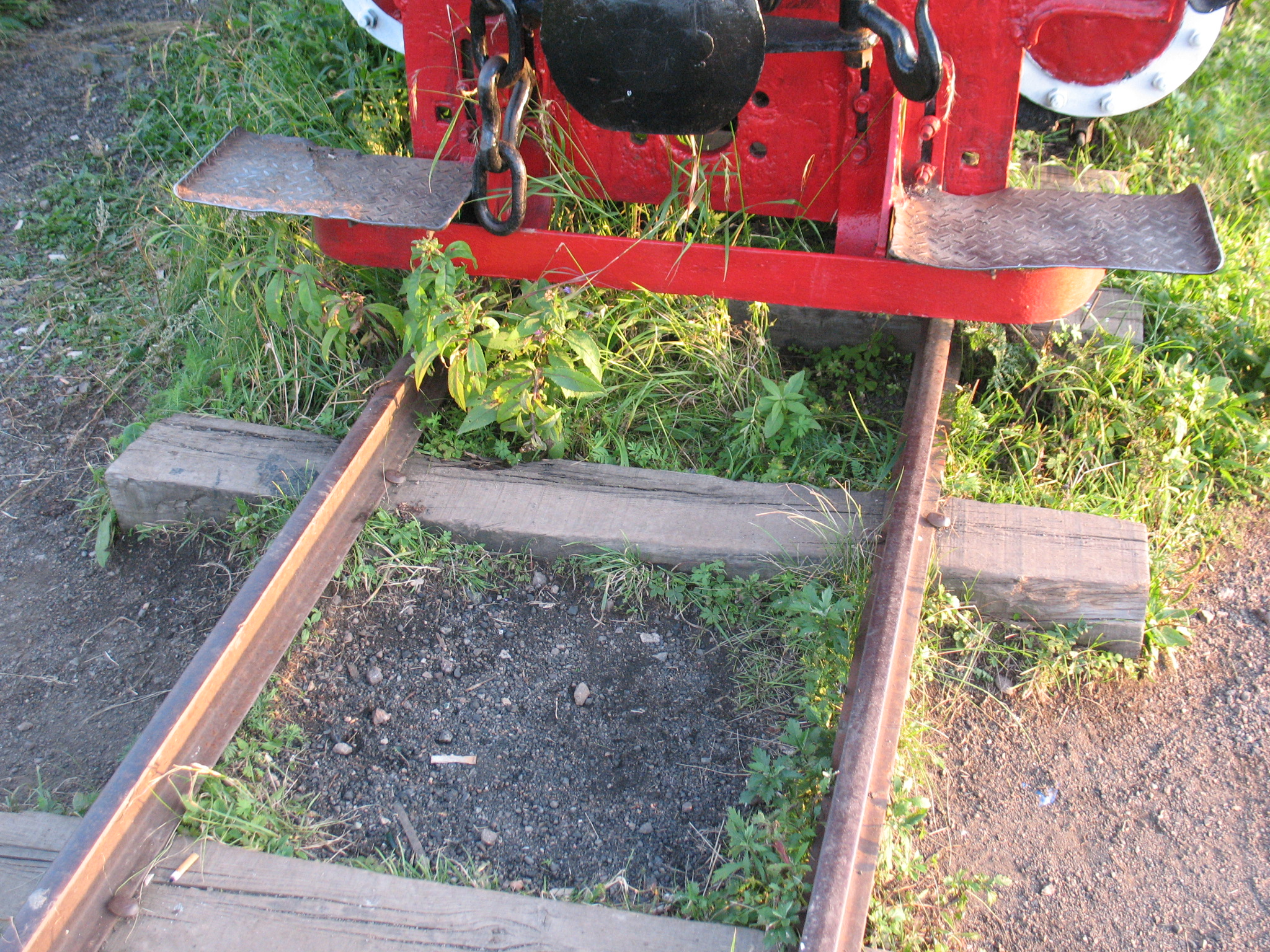
The steam locomotive and the railroad

It ran during the 1950s and 1990s, carried wood, goods and passengers. Its highest speed is 60 km/h.

=== Xinyi Railway ===
Xinyi Railway was a 42.5 km–long branch line of the Beijing-Hankou Railway (now the Beijing–Guangzhou railway) located in Hebei. It was built in the winter of 1902 to allow the Empress Dowager Cixi to travel from Beijing to the Western Qing Tombs. Although the railway had no economic benefit, it was the first railway to be financed and built by the Chinese alone.

The empress dowager and the Guangxu Emperor fled to Xi'an in the aftermath of the Boxer Rebellion. After the Boxer Protocol was signed in September 1901, Cixi and the royal family made their way back from Xi'an to Beijing in December, taking a special train along the Lo-Han Railway (now also part of the Beijing–Guangzhou Railway) from Shijiazhuang to Beijing. To atone for the occupation of Beijing by the Eight-Nation Alliance, the Empress first visited the Eastern Qing Tombs in April. Afterward she intended to go to Western Qing Tombs. Because of the distance, she thought of traveling by train. The Empress then ordered Governor Yuan Shikai to construct a railway from Gaobeidian to Yi County, Hebei, within six months at a cost of tls. 600,000.

The Xinyi Railway headed west from Gaobeidian across two rivers. Yuan Shikai originally chose British engineer Claude W. Kinder to carry out the construction. Claude was the Kaiping Tramway's chief engineer, as well as the chief engineer of its extensions. Unexpectedly, this led to a French protest, so Yuan Shikai decided that the Chinese would carry out the construction themselves, appointing Jeme Tien Yow chief engineer on 19 October.

The project started in November and was completed by February 1903. The railway used old track and sleepers from the Guanneiwai Railway. On 5 April 1903, the empress and other members of the dynasty rode a special train from the Beijing Yongdingmen along the Beijing-Hankou line, then switching to the new track. The whole length was about 120 km, taking a little over two hours. The Empress was pleased with the railway and train and gave the engineer a yellow jacket, flowers, feathers, and the title of prefect.

Cixi only used the railway once. The line was destroyed during the Second Sino-Japanese War, its track being used to repair other railways. Later, it was repaired and regauged during the Great Leap Forward. In the 1990s, it was renamed the Gaoyi Railway.

== Chronological summary ==
The following narrow gauge lines have been constructed in China (in chronological order, excluding Taiwan):

| Image | Opening Date | Line | Gauge | Length |
|---|---|---|---|---|
| | 1876 | Shanghai to Wusong, Jiangsu | 2 ft 6 in (762 mm) | 10 miles (16 km) |
| | 1886 | Decauville railway Tianjin – Jinnan | 600 mm (1 ft 11 5/8 in) | 2 kilometres (1.2 mi) |
| | 1888 | Xiyuan Railway | 800 mm (2 ft 7 1/2 in) | 2.3 kilometres (1.4 mi) |
| | 1900 | Shanhaiguan to fort | 600 mm (1 ft 11 5/8 in) | 4 kilometres (2.5 mi) |
| | 1900 | Beidaihe to military depot | 600 mm (1 ft 11 5/8 in) | 7 kilometres (4.3 mi) |
| | 1900 | Kaiping to military depot | 600 mm (1 ft 11 5/8 in) | 5 kilometres (3.1 mi) |
| | 1901 | Beitang to Tianjin | 600 mm (1 ft 11 5/8 in) | 4.5 kilometres (2.8 mi) |
| | 1904 | Xinmindun to Mukden, Liaoning | 2 ft 6 in (762 mm) | 38 miles (61 km) |
| | 1904 | Sujiatun to Aigun, Liaoning | 2 ft 6 in (762 mm) | 162 miles (261 km) |
| | 1904 | Xingguo mining line, Hubei | unknown gauge | 20 miles (32 km) |
| | 1905 | Shijiazhuang to Fa-Iii-ling, Hebei | 1,000 mm (3 ft 3 3/8 in) | 38 miles (61 km) |
| | 1905 | Beijing to Nanyuan, Hebei | 3 ft 3 in (991 mm) | 5 miles (8.0 km) |
| | 1905 | Wuchang Mint, Hubei | 3 ft 8 in (1.12 m) | 5 miles (8.0 km) |
| | 1906 | Fa-Iii-ling to Pingtan, Shanxi | 1,000 mm (3 ft 3 3/8 in) | 38 miles (61 km) |
| | 1907 | Pingtan to Taiyuan, Shanxi | 1,000 mm (3 ft 3 3/8 in) | 75 miles (121 km) |
| | 1907 | Lokou to Xiaoqing River, Shandong | narrow gauge | 4 miles (6.4 km) |
| | 1909 | Qiqihar to Ang'angxi, Heilongjiang | narrow gauge | 18 miles (29 km) |
| | 1909 | Laoka to Mengzi, Yunnan | 1,000 mm (3 ft 3 3/8 in) | 103 miles (166 km) |
| | 1910 | Mengzi to Kunming, Yunnan | 1,000 mm (3 ft 3 3/8 in) | 190 miles (310 km) |
| | 1911 | Toli to Qingganggou, Hebei | unknown gauge | 26 miles (42 km) |
| | 1911 | Sha Tau Kok Railway, Hong Kong | 2 ft (610 mm) | 7.25 miles (11.67 km) |
| | 1912 | Jilin City to Changchun, Jilin | unknown gauge | 79 miles (127 km) |
| | 1912 | Shuikoushan lead/zinc mine, Hunan, | 600 mm (1 ft 11 5/8 in) | 4 miles (6.4 km) |
| | 1913 | Shuangcheng line, Jilin, | 2 ft 2 in (660 mm) | 4 miles (6.4 km) |
| | 1914 | Benxihu to Niuxintai, Liaoning | 2 ft 6 in (762 mm) | 9 miles (14 km) |
| | 1914 | Nangang to Logang, Liaoning | narrow gauge | 5 miles (8.0 km) |
| | 1914 | Nanfen to Miao'ergou, Liaoning | narrow gauge | 5 miles (8.0 km) |
| | 1914 | Short segment of Tongpu Railway, Shanxi | 1,000 mm (3 ft 3 3/8 in) | 5 miles (8.0 km) |
| | 1916 | Liujiang coal line, Hebei | 2 ft 6 in (762 mm) | 11 miles (18 km) |
| | 1916 | Jiawang coal line, Jiangsu | narrow gauge | 14 miles (23 km) |
| | 1916 | Guangzhou to Longyen, Guangdong | 2 ft 6 in (762 mm) | 23 miles (37 km) |
| | 1918 | Xiangbishan to Wuwangmiao, Hubei | unknown gauge | 16 miles (26 km) |
| | 1918 | Tafeng coal line, Hebei | 2 ft 8 in (813 mm) | 4 miles (6.4 km) |
| | 1918 | Yili coal line, Hebei | 2 ft 6 in (762 mm) | 13 miles (21 km) |
| | 1918 | Minxing coal line, Hebei | narrow gauge | 1 mile (1.6 km) |
| | 1921 | Gejiu to Bisezhai and Jijie to Shiping, Yunnan | 1,000 mm (3 ft 3 3/8 in) | 84 miles (135 km) |
| | 1921 | Yihua iron mine, Anhui | 2 ft 6 in (762 mm) | 12 miles (19 km) |
| | 1921 | Jingfu salt line, Sichuan | 3 ft (914 mm) | 18 miles (29 km) |
| | 1922 | Changxing coal line, Zhejiang | 3 ft (914 mm) | 16 miles (26 km) |
| | 1922 | Liuhegou to Dudang, Henan | unknown gauge | 4 miles (6.4 km) |
| | 1922 | Baochang coal line, Hebei | narrow gauge | 2 miles (3.2 km) |
| | 1923 | Boshan coal line, Shandong | unknown gauge | 13 miles (21 km) |
| | 1924 | Laotougou to Korean border, Jilin | 2 ft 6 in (762 mm) | 69 miles (111 km) |
| | 1924 | Jitang coal line, Hebei | 3 ft (914 mm) | 39 miles (63 km) |
| | 1924 | Qinhuangdao to Yiyuankou, Hebei | 3 ft 3 in (991 mm) | 20 miles (32 km) |
| | 1924 | Tianyuan coal line, Shandong | 1 ft 11 1/2 in (597 mm) | 12 miles (19 km) |
| | 1924 | Baoxing iron line, Anhui | 2 ft 6 in (762 mm) | 6 miles (9.7 km) |
| | 1925 | Qinhuangdao to Shilingzhuang, Hebei | 3 ft 6 in (1,067 mm) | 18 miles (29 km) |
| | 1925 | Wangping to Sanjiadian, Hebei | 2 ft 6 in (762 mm) | 14 miles (23 km) |
| | 1925 | Addition to Yiyi coal line, Hebei | 2 ft 6 in (762 mm) | 4 miles (6.4 km) |
| | 1925 | Nanzhang to Fengshan, Hebei | 3 ft 3 in (991 mm) | 4 miles (6.4 km) |
| | 1934 | Yuanping to Linfen, Shanxi | 1,000 mm (3 ft 3 3/8 in) | 230 miles (370 km) |
| | 1935 | Xinxian to Hebian, Shanxi | 1,000 mm (3 ft 3 3/8 in) | 25 miles (40 km) |
| | 1936 | Yuanping to Ningwu, Shanxi | 1,000 mm (3 ft 3 3/8 in) | 25 miles (40 km) |
| | 1937 | Yuanping to Yangming, Pingyao to Fenyang and Ningwu to Datong, Shanxi | 1,000 mm (3 ft 3 3/8 in) | 182 miles (293 km) |

== See also ==
- Transport in the People's Republic of China
