= Fenglingdu railway station =

Railway station in Yuncheng, Shanxi

Fenglingdu 风陵渡
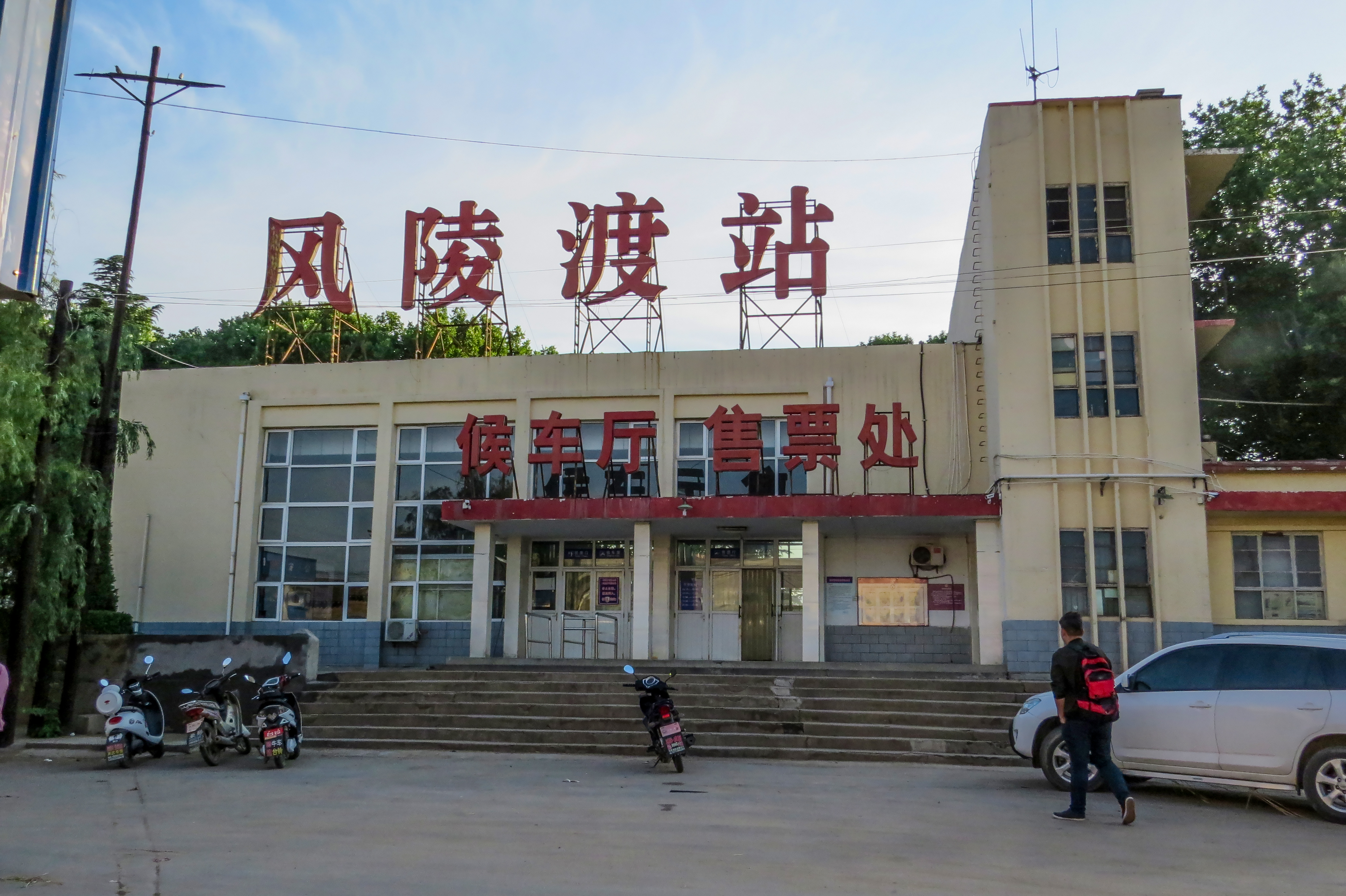

General information
- Location: Fenglingdu, Ruicheng County, Yuncheng, Shanxi; China
- Coordinates: 34°37′58″N 110°18′20″E
- Line: Datong–Puzhou railway

Other information
- Station code: 28220
Location

Fenglingdu railway station (Chinese: 风陵渡站) is a railway station in Fenglingdu, Ruicheng County, Yuncheng, Shanxi, China. It is an intermediate stop on the Datong–Puzhou railway. It handles passengers and freight.

In 2021 there was a daily service between here and Linfen, a service in both directions between Linfen and Suzhou, and a daily service to Shenzhen West.

Preceding station	China Railway	Following station
Yongji towards Datong	Datong–Puzhou railway	Mengyuan Terminus
