= Wenxi railway station =

Railway station in Yuncheng, Shanxi

Wenxi 闻喜

General information
- Location: Wenxi County, Yuncheng, Shanxi; China
- Coordinates: 35°21′23.14″N 111°12′36.07″E
- Line: Datong–Puzhou railway
Location

Wenxi railway station (Chinese: 闻喜站) is a railway station in Wenxi County, Yuncheng, Shanxi, China. It is an intermediate stop on the Datong–Puzhou railway.

== See also ==
- Wenxi West railway station

| Preceding station | China Railway | Following station |
|---|---|---|
| Dongzhen towards Datong | Datong–Puzhou railway | Yuncheng towards Mengyuan |
