= Yongji railway station =

Railway station in Yuncheng, Shanxi

Yongji 永济
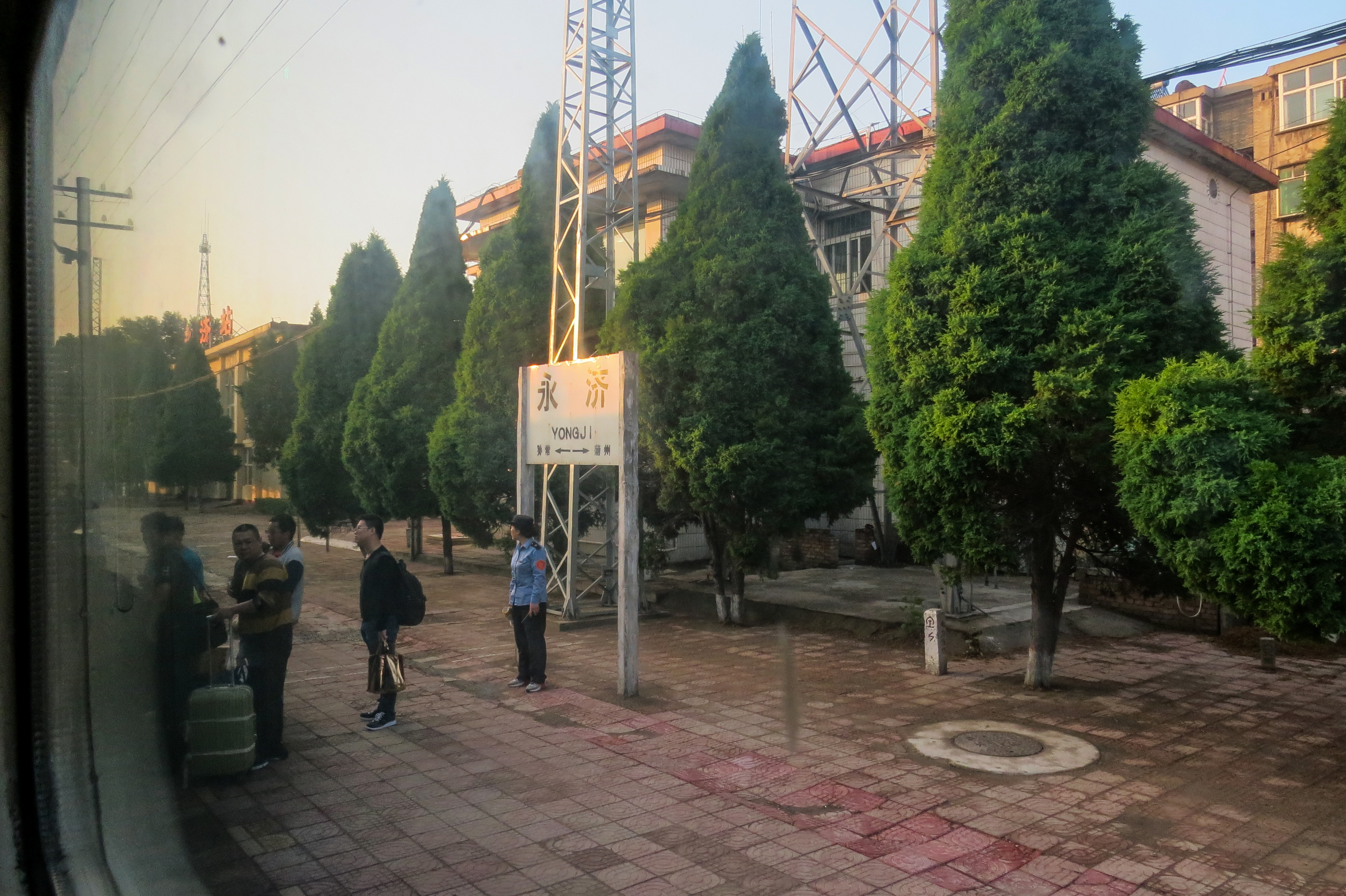

General information
- Location: Yongji, Yuncheng, Shanxi; China
- Coordinates: 34.870773°N 110.448371°E
- Line: Datong–Puzhou railway
Location

Yongji railway station (Chinese: 永济站) is a railway station in Yongji, Yuncheng, Shanxi, China. It is an intermediate stop on the Datong–Puzhou railway. It handles passengers and freight. The station was originally called Zhaoyi (Chinese: 赵伊), its name was changed in 1957.

Preceding station	China Railway	Following station
Yuncheng towards Datong	Datong–Puzhou railway	Fenglingdu towards Mengyuan
