= Yuncheng railway station (Shanxi) =

Railway station in Yuncheng, Shanxi

Yuncheng 运城
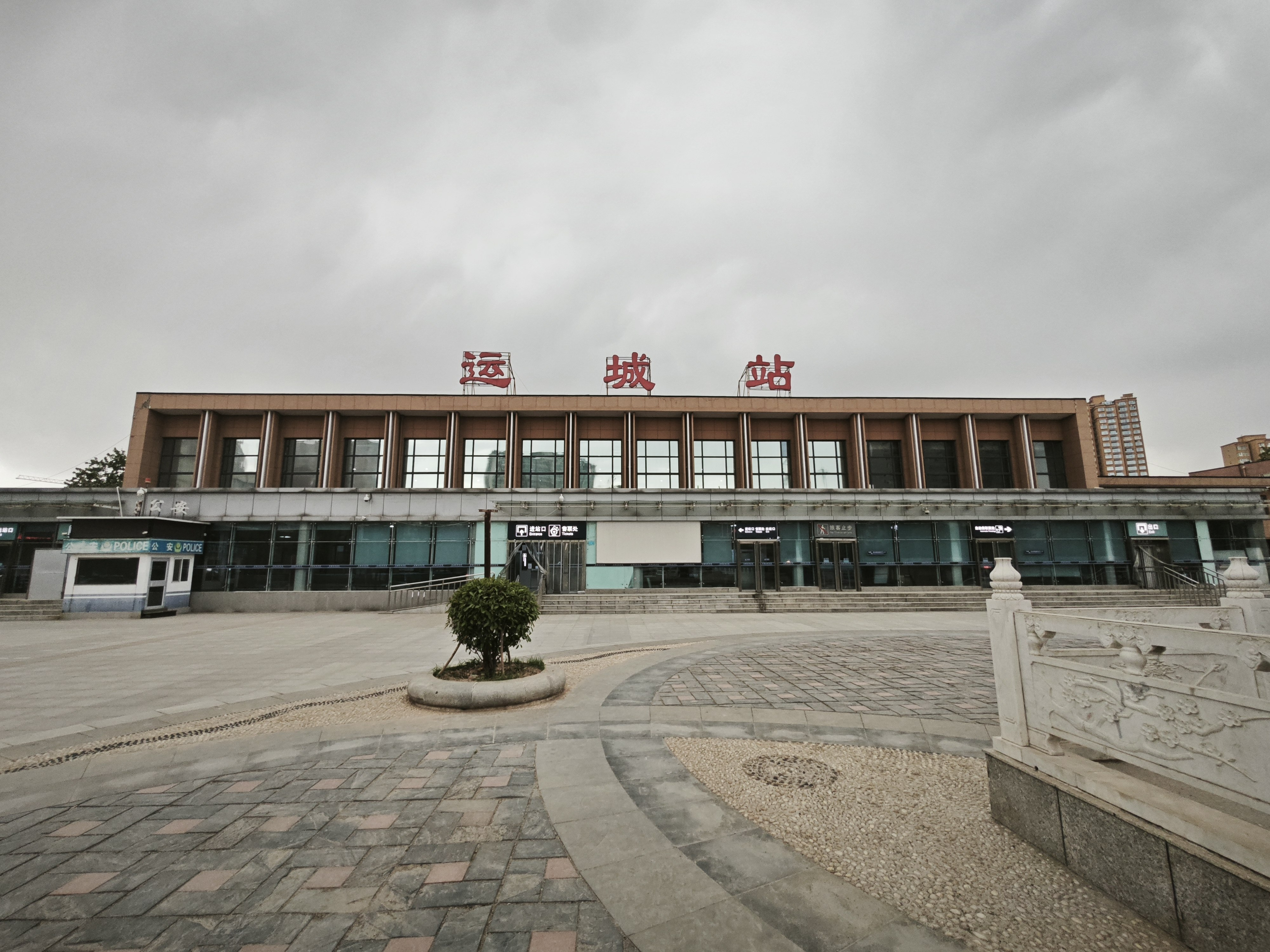

General information
- Location: Yanhu District, Yuncheng, Shanxi; China
- Coordinates: 35°1′37.29″N 110°59′6.03″E
- Line: Datong–Puzhou railway

Other information
- Station code: 28175 (TMIS)
Location

Yuncheng railway station (Chinese: 运城站) is a railway station in Yanhu District, Yuncheng, Shanxi, China. It is an intermediate stop on the Datong–Puzhou railway.

== See also ==
- Yuncheng North railway station

Preceding station	China Railway	Following station
Wenxi towards Datong	Datong–Puzhou railway	Yongji towards Mengyuan
