= Ningwu Railway =

Ningwu Railway may refer to three Chinese railways:

- Nanjing–Wuhu Railway, also known as the Ningwu Railway
- Ningwu–Jingle Railway, entirely in Shanxi, also known as the Ningjing Railway
- Ningwu–Kelan Railway, entirely in Shanxi, also known as the Ningke Railway
