= Puzhou railway station =

Railway station in Yuncheng, Shanxi

Puzhou 蒲州
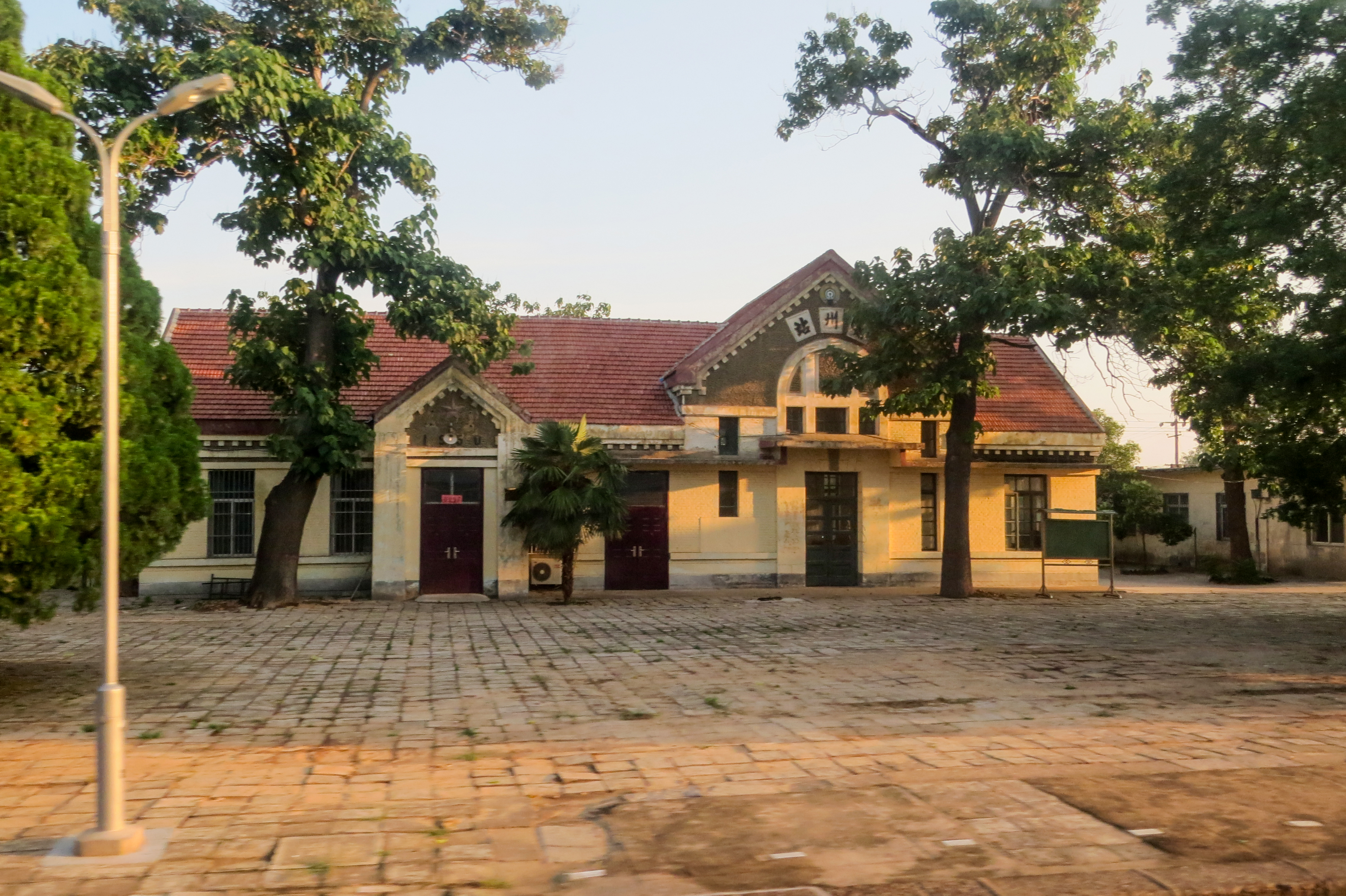
- Station building in 2017

General information
- Location: Yongji, Yuncheng, Shanxi; China
- Coordinates: 34°49′39.43″N 110°19′44.59″E
- Line(s): Datong–Puzhou railway

Other information
- Station code: 28211 (TMIS code); PZV (telegram code)

History
- Opened: 1936

Puzhou railway station (Chinese: 蒲州站) is a railway station in Yongji, Yuncheng, Shanxi, China. It is an intermediate stop on the Datong–Puzhou railway. It formerly handled passengers, but is now used exclusively for freight.

== History ==
The railway station opened in 1936 and was originally called Yongji. Its name was changed to Puzhou in 1957. Passenger services ceased in the late 1980s.
