= Mengyuan railway station =

Mengyuan railway station may refer to:

- Mengyuan railway station (Shaanxi), in Shaanxi, China
- Mengyuan railway station (Yunnan), a station on Yuxi-Mohan railway in Yunnan, China.
