= Yuncheng railway station =

Yuncheng railway station may refer to:

- Yuncheng railway station (郓城站), a railway station in Yuncheng County, Heze, Shandong, China.
- Yuncheng railway station (运城站), a railway station in Yanhu District, Yuncheng, Shanxi, China.
