= Fenglingdu =

Town in Yuncheng, China

Fenglingdu 风陵渡镇
- Town
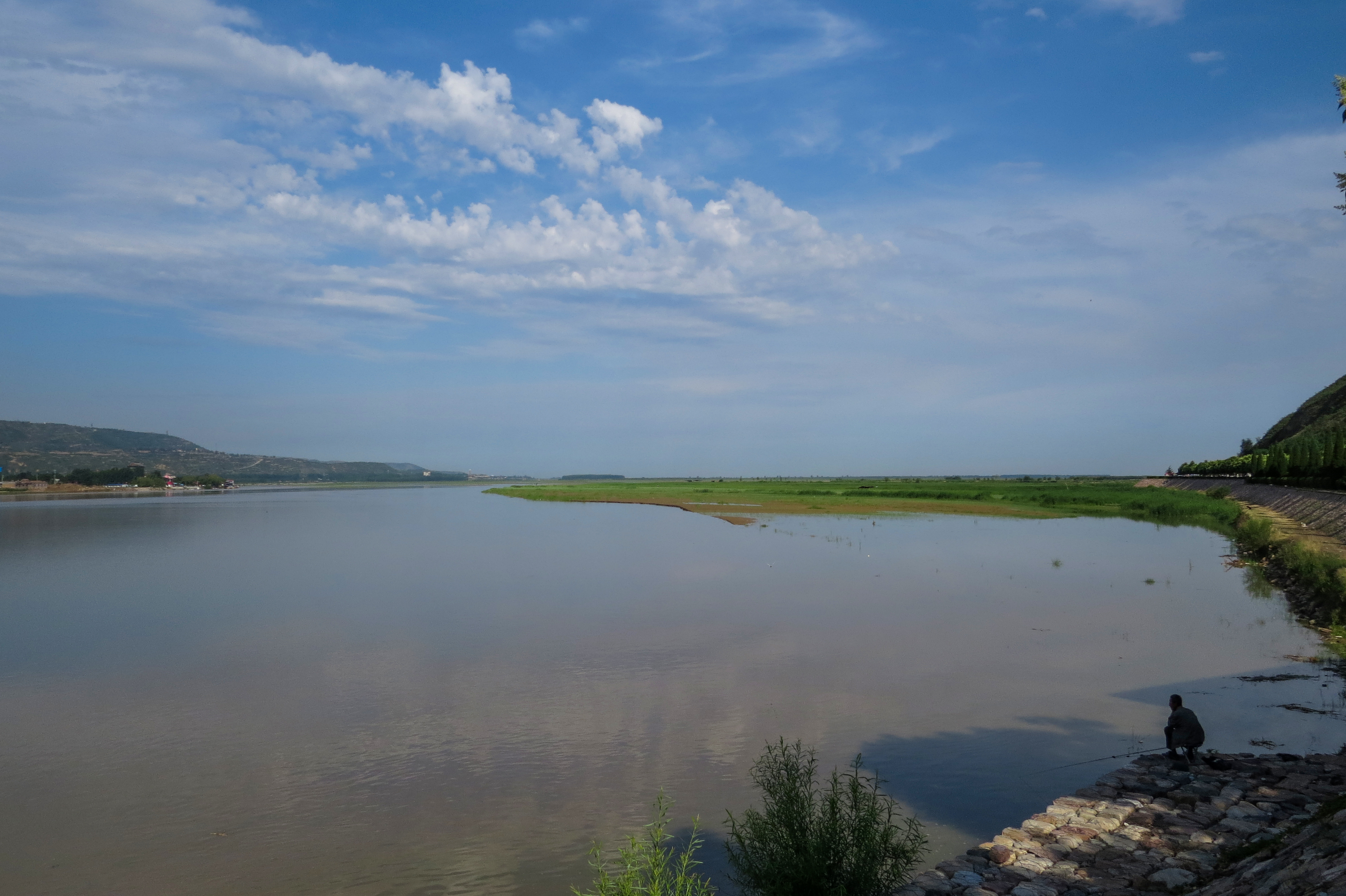
- The Yellow River at Fenglingdu

- Location in Shanxi
- Coordinates: 34°37′53″N 110°18′32″E
- Country: People's Republic of China
- Province: Shanxi
- Prefecture-level city: Yuncheng
- County: Ruicheng County
- Time zone: UTC+8 (China Standard)

Fenglingdu (Chinese: 风陵渡; pinyin: Fēnglíngdù) is a town in Ruicheng County, Yuncheng, Shanxi, China. As of 2020, it administers Fenghuang Residential Community (凤凰社区) and the following 34 villages:

- Zhao Village (赵村)
- Xiwang Village (西王村)
- Puzi Village (堡子村)
- Dongzhang Village (东章村)
- Tianshang Village (田上村)
- Tanguo Village (谭郭村)
- Sanjiao Village (三焦村)
- Handu Village (汉渡村)
- Xiaoli Village (晓里村)
- Beijieyi Village (北节义村)
- Gaojia Village (高家村)
- Zhongji Village (中基村)
- Houfeng Village (候峰村)
- Beiqu Village (北曲村)
- Qili Village (七里村)
- Zhongyao New Village (中瑶新村)
- Wangyao Village (王瑶村)
- Yaoke Village (瑶珂中心村)
- Shangtian Village (上田村)
- Liuguan Village (六管村)
- Wangliao Village (王辽村)
- Gulun Village (古伦村)
- Xihoudu Village (西侯度村)
- Kehe Village (匼河村)
- Huawang Village (华望村)
- Xiyang Village (西阳村)
- Luwang Village (芦王村)
- Dongbaitai Village (东柏台村)
- Xibaitai Village (西柏台村)
- Tian Village (田村)
- Jiaolu Village (焦芦村)
- Yangxian Village (阳贤村)
- Dongsan Village (东三村)
- Xitaiyang Village (西太阳村)

Fenglingdu is located on the Yellow River, and across the river is Tongguan County. It had 69,998 people.

== Transportation ==
The area is served by Fenglingdu railway station.
