= Loufan County =

Loufan 娄烦县
- County
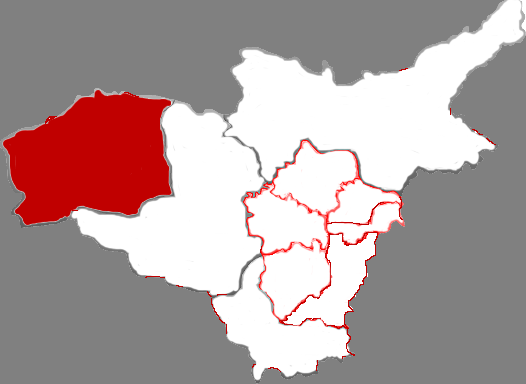
- Location in Taiyuan

- Location of the seat in Shanxi
- Coordinates: 38°04′07″N 111°47′51″E
- Country: People's Republic of China
- Province: Shanxi
- Prefecture-level city: Taiyuan

Population (2020)
  - Total: 91,208
- Time zone: UTC+8 (China Standard)

Loufan County
- Traditional Chinese: 婁煩縣
- Simplified Chinese: 娄烦县
Transcriptions
Standard Mandarin
- Hanyu Pinyin: Lóufánxiàn
- Wade–Giles: Lou-fan Hsien

Loufan County is a county of Shanxi Province, North China, it is under the administration of the prefecture-level city of Taiyuan, the capital of the province. It is the westernmost county-level division of Taiyuan.

== Name ==
Loufan is named for the Loufan Kingdom (婁煩 Lóufán < Eastern Han Chinese *l(i)o-buɑn < Old Chinese *ro-ban 620 BCE ?, ca.; 307 BCE) in ancient China during the Warring States period, which was conquered by the state of Zhao in two campaigns in 306 and 304 BC after the adoption of nomad (Hu) weapons and customs by the King Wuling of Zhao. During Emperor Gaozu of Han's time, Loufan were associated with the Xiongnu.

== History ==
Loufan County formed part of Yanmen Commandery under the Qin and Han. Its former seat is now located in Ningwu County in Xinzhou Prefecture.

== Climate ==
Climate data for Loufan, elevation 1,150 m (3,770 ft), (1991–2020 normals, extremes 1981–2010)
Month	Jan	Feb	Mar	Apr	May	Jun	Jul	Aug	Sep	Oct	Nov	Dec	Year
Record high °C (°F)	11.6 (52.9)	21.1 (70.0)	25.9 (78.6)	34.2 (93.6)	34.7 (94.5)	38.9 (102.0)	37.1 (98.8)	35.3 (95.5)	34.8 (94.6)	27.9 (82.2)	22.0 (71.6)	14.9 (58.8)	38.9 (102.0)
Mean daily maximum °C (°F)	1.1 (34.0)	5.1 (41.2)	11.2 (52.2)	18.6 (65.5)	24.1 (75.4)	28.0 (82.4)	29.0 (84.2)	26.9 (80.4)	22.5 (72.5)	16.4 (61.5)	8.8 (47.8)	2.2 (36.0)	16.2 (61.1)
Daily mean °C (°F)	−7.6 (18.3)	−3.5 (25.7)	3.1 (37.6)	10.5 (50.9)	16.5 (61.7)	20.5 (68.9)	22.3 (72.1)	20.3 (68.5)	15.1 (59.2)	8.4 (47.1)	0.8 (33.4)	−5.9 (21.4)	8.4 (47.1)
Mean daily minimum °C (°F)	−14.0 (6.8)	−10.1 (13.8)	−3.9 (25.0)	2.7 (36.9)	8.5 (47.3)	13.3 (55.9)	16.6 (61.9)	15.0 (59.0)	9.3 (48.7)	2.2 (36.0)	−4.9 (23.2)	−11.7 (10.9)	1.9 (35.4)
Record low °C (°F)	−24.8 (−12.6)	−22.0 (−7.6)	−16.6 (2.1)	−8.4 (16.9)	−1.4 (29.5)	3.6 (38.5)	9.1 (48.4)	6.5 (43.7)	−1.9 (28.6)	−8.4 (16.9)	−19.4 (−2.9)	−26.8 (−16.2)	−26.8 (−16.2)
Average precipitation mm (inches)	1.6 (0.06)	4.0 (0.16)	8.8 (0.35)	22.9 (0.90)	33.0 (1.30)	56.3 (2.22)	103.9 (4.09)	103.0 (4.06)	58.8 (2.31)	27.1 (1.07)	9.9 (0.39)	1.6 (0.06)	430.9 (16.97)
Average precipitation days (≥ 0.1 mm)	1.9	2.6	3.7	5.4	6.7	10.2	13.6	11.9	9.3	6.4	3.8	1.4	76.9
Average snowy days	2.7	4.3	3.7	1.1	0	0	0	0	0	0.3	3.1	2.7	17.9
Average relative humidity (%)	51	48	44	43	45	55	68	73	71	63	58	52	56
Mean monthly sunshine hours	195.7	190.7	222.4	234.8	260.1	245.9	222.9	206.7	186.9	204.8	192.2	193.6	2,556.7
Percentage possible sunshine	64	62	60	59	59	56	50	50	51	60	64	66	58
Source: China Meteorological Administration
