= Ningwu–Kelan railway =

Railway line in Shanxi, China

The railway in Ningwu

Ningwu–Kelan railway or Ningke railway (simplified Chinese: 宁岢铁路; traditional Chinese: 寧岢鐵路; pinyin: níngkě tiělù), is a single-track regional railroad in Shanxi Province of northern China between Ningwu and Kelan Counties. The line is 95.95 km (60 mi) long, and was built between 1967 and 1971 as a national defense railroad to support the building of the Third Front in China's mountainous interior. The Taiyuan Satellite Launch Center in Kelan County, a space rocket and strategic missile launch facility, is located along route. In recent years, the railway has been used to transport growing coal output from northern Shanxi and was electrified in 2008 to increase transport capacity.

== Rail connections ==
- Ningwu: Datong–Puzhou railway, Ningwu–Jingle railway

== See also ==
- List of railways in China
