= Gushan railway station (Shanxi) =

Railway station in Datong, China

Gushan railway station is a station on the Beijing–Baotou railway. It is located in Datong City, Shanxi. Not to be confused with the Gushan railway station in Taiwan.

Preceding station	China Railway	Following station
Datong towards Beijing North	Beijing–Baotou railway	Baoziwan towards Baotou
