= Homage to the Highest Power =

Daoist painting

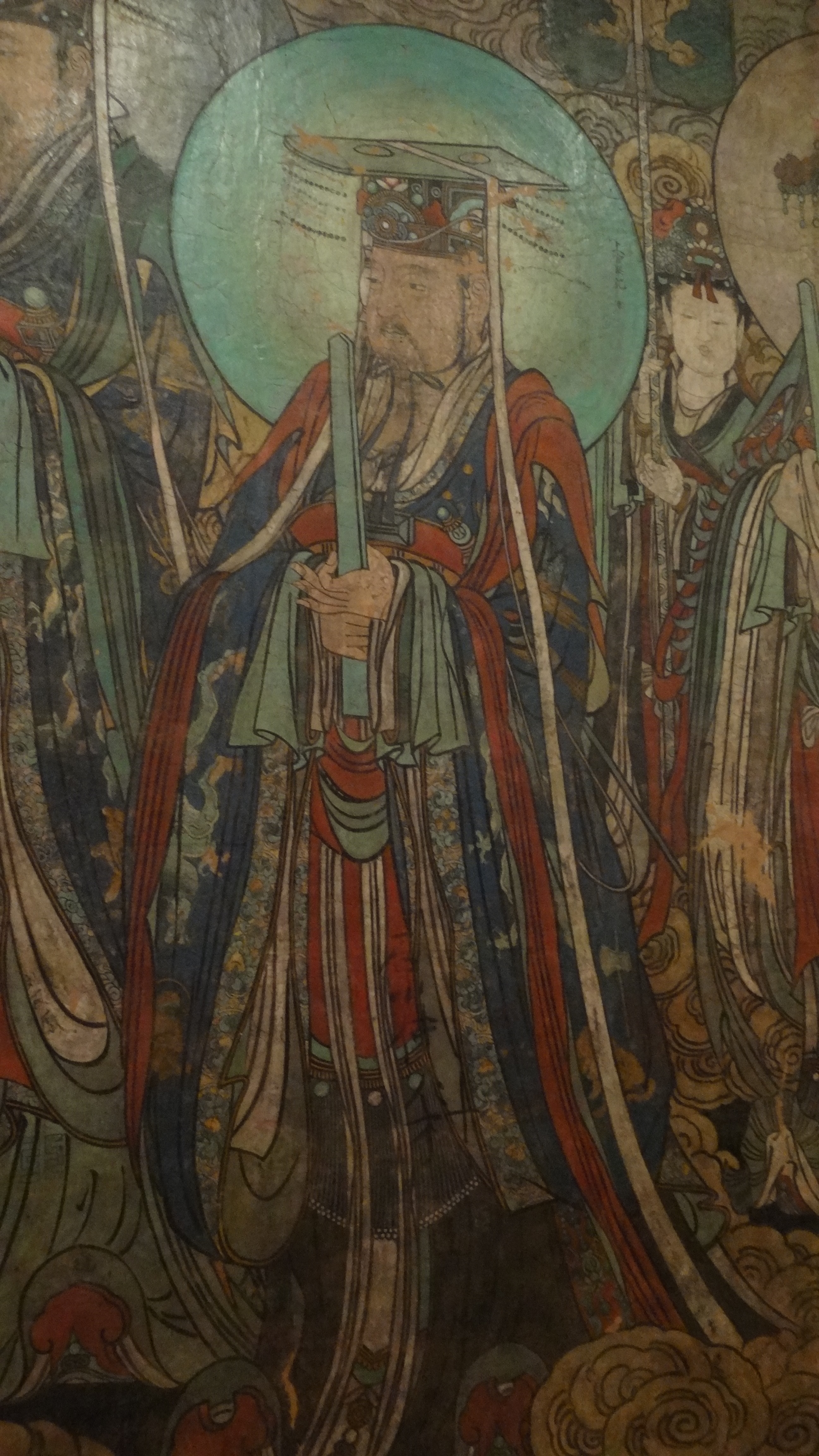
Central Figure: Lord of the Southern Dipper

Homage to the Highest Power (朝元圖) is a prime example of Daoist paintings in the Royal Ontario Museum collection. The wall painting was created during the late Yuan Dynasty, c. 1271–1368. The painting is colored pigments mixed with clay and plaster. It measures 306.5 cm high and 1042 cm in length. This painting is similar to those found in Sanqing Hall of the Yongle Gong in Shanxi province. The Sanqing Hall paintings are dated by an inscription to 1325. Based on the strong stylistic affinities, this work can also be dated to the Yuan dynasty.

== Daoist imagery ==
Homage to the Highest Power is a popular theme in Daoist pictorial art. Daoist theology advocates the concept of Dao (the Way), a primeval force which gives form to all things in the universe. Homage to Dao is expected of all regular followers.

== Description ==
The wall painting is one of a pair from the Pingyang region of southern Shanxi province. This work was created as decoration for the west wall of a temple hall or worship space. It is symmetrically balanced leading your eye first to the central figures and then fanning out on either side. It shows a procession of heavenly beings moving at a leisurely pace to pay homage to the Supreme Power.

The procession is led by a fierce warrior, the Lord of the Southern Dipper (Sagittarius). He leads nine star spirits, female attendants with plant offerings, three important deities, and personifications of the twelve Earthly Branches. The three deities have been identified as Laozi (founder of Daoism) with the Jade Emperor and the Empress of Heaven, or Laozi with the Holy Ancestor and Ancestress of the Song Dynasty (960–1279).

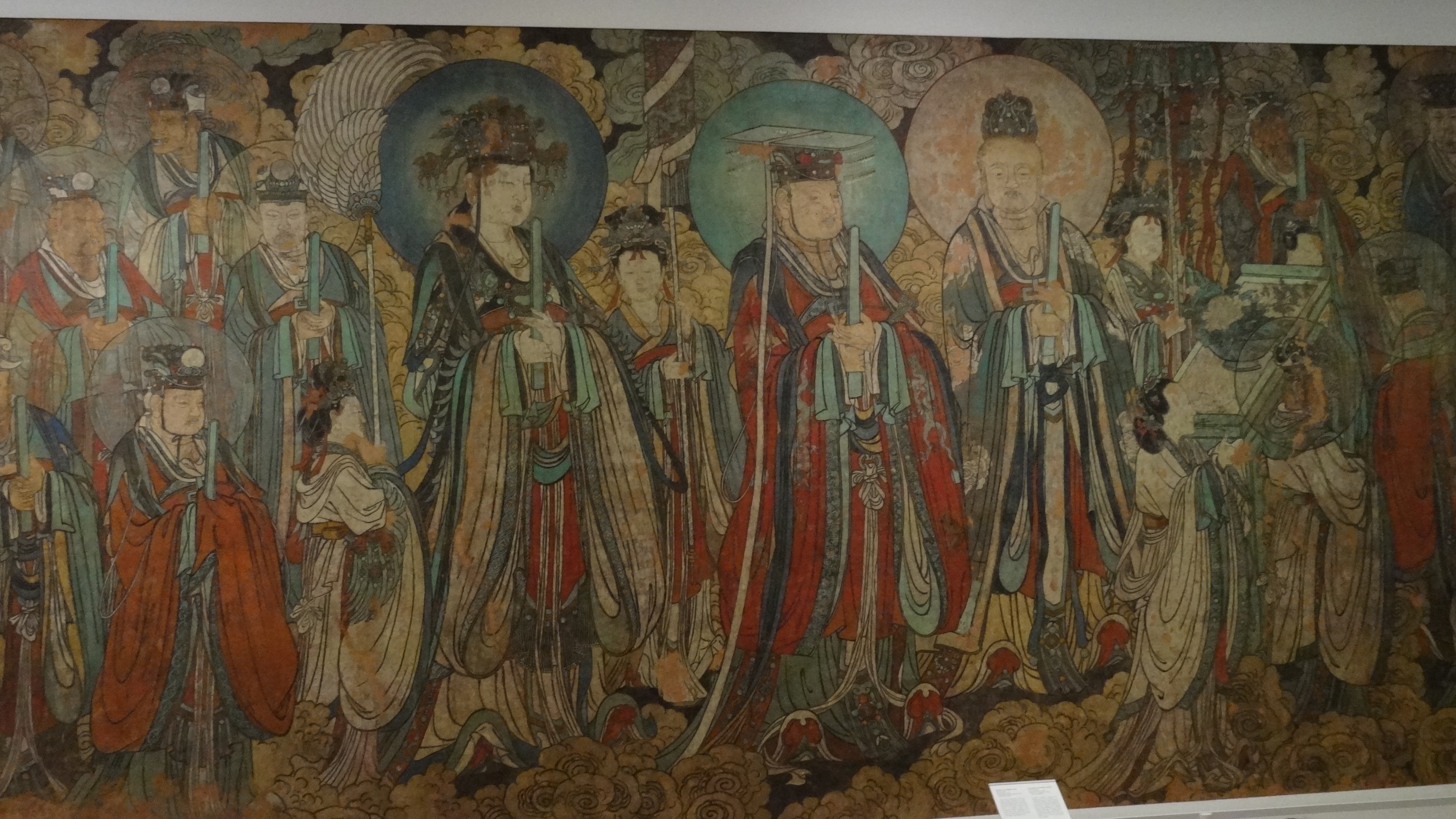
Central images in the mural Homage to the Highest Power

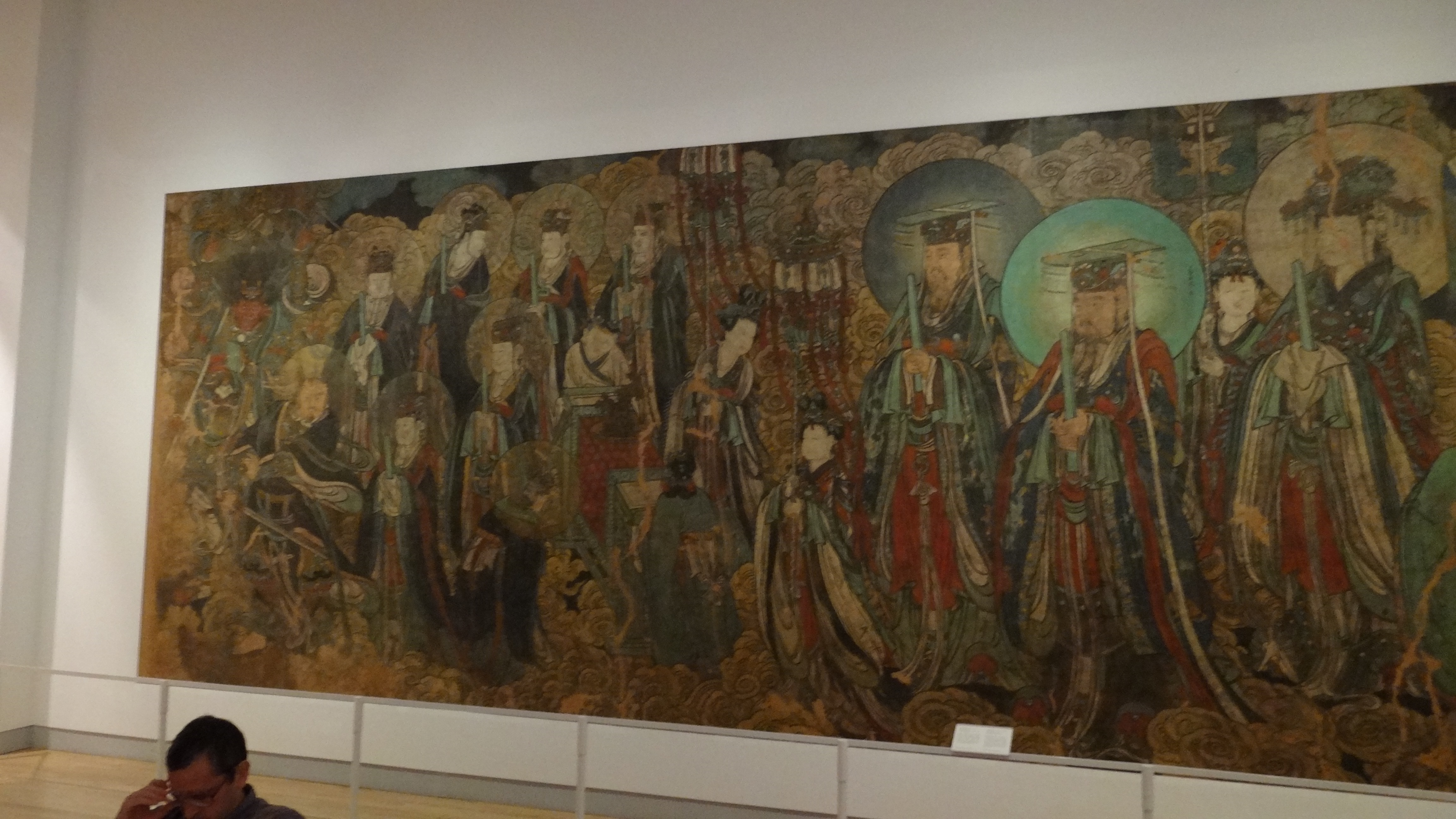
Left side of mural

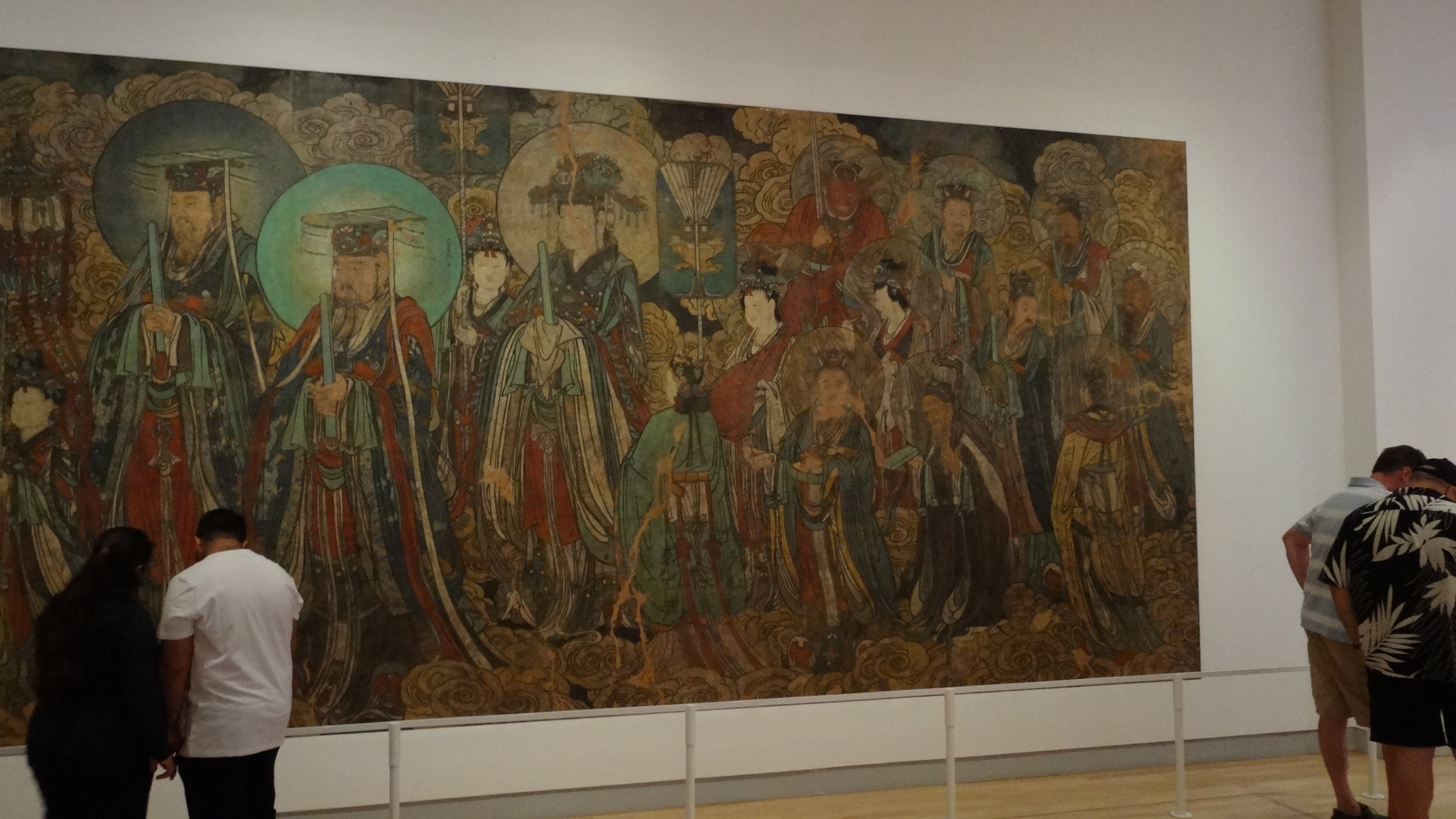
Right side of mural
