= Yongle Gong =

Taoist temple in Shanxi, China

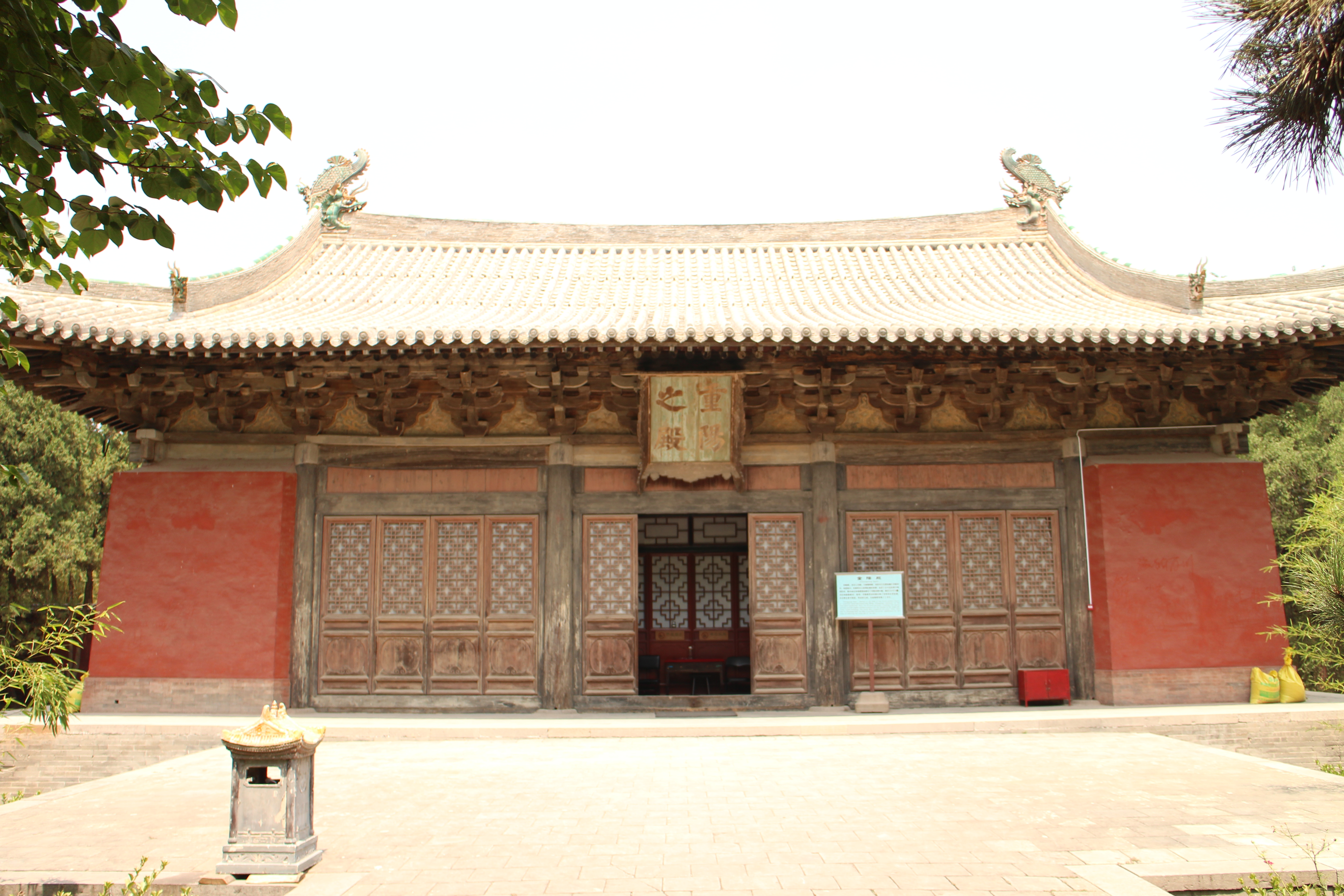
Chongyang Hall, one of the three main halls in Yongle Gong

Yongle Gong is a historic Taoist temple complex (Despite misleadingly referred to as Yongle Palace due to literal translation) in Ruicheng, Shanxi Province, notable for its Yuan dynasty murals. Built over a period of 128 years between 1240 and 1358 and dedicated to the Taoist saint of Lü Dongbin, the temple was originally located in Yongle Town some 15 miles west of its current site. It was dismantled and relocated piece-by-piece to the current location between 1958 and 1966 since construction of the Sanmenxia Dam flooded its original site. It was one of 180 sites listed as the first batch of Major Historical and Cultural Site Protected at the National Level.

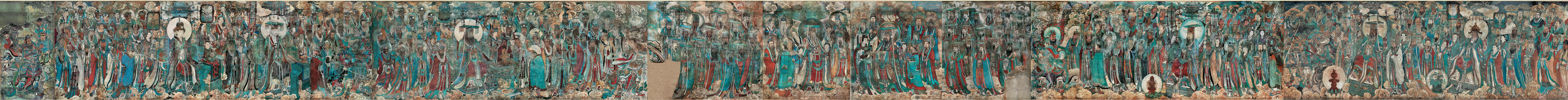
Murals of Yongle temple, depicting the Chinese heavenly pantheon

== See also ==
- Homage to the Highest Power
