= Ningwu–Jingle railway =

Railway line in Shanxi, China

Ningwu–Jingle railway or Ningjing railway (simplified Chinese: 宁静铁路; traditional Chinese: 寧靜鐵路; pinyin: níngjìng tiělù), is a single-track regional railroad in Shanxi Province of northern China between Ningwu and Jingle. The line is 93.6 km (58 mi) long, and was built from 1993 to 1995. The Ningwu to Huabeitun section began commercial operation in 2000 and the Huabeitun to Jingle section followed in 2008. The line is primarily used by trains carrying coal.

== Rail connections ==
- Ningwu: Datong–Puzhou railway, Ningwu–Kelan railway

== See also ==
- List of railways in China
