= Yanhu District =

Yanhu 盐湖区
- District
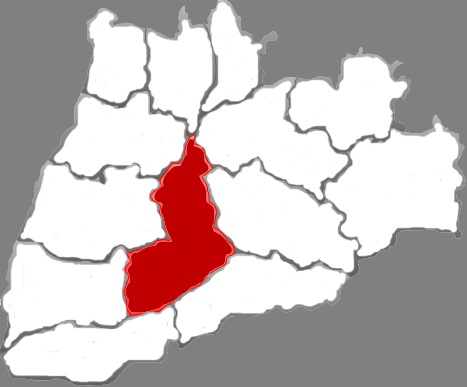
- Location in Yuncheng

- Location in Shanxi
- Coordinates: 35°00′54″N 110°59′54″E
- Country: People's Republic of China
- Province: Shanxi
- Prefecture-level city: Yuncheng

Area
  - Total: 1,205 km^{2} (465 sq mi)

Population (2020)
  - Total: 928,334
  - Density: 770.4/km^{2} (1,995/sq mi)
- Time zone: UTC+8 (China Standard)
- Website: www.yanhu.gov.cn/gov/index

Yanhu District (simplified Chinese: 盐湖区; traditional Chinese: 鹽湖區; pinyin: Yánhú Qū; lit. 'salt lake') is the main district of the city of Yuncheng, Shanxi province, China. Guan Yu's birthplace Xie county is located here.

== History ==
In 2009, a series of ten kidnappings were reported in the area, part of a series of fifty kidnappings in Yuncheng.

== Transportation ==
Yuncheng railway station is located here.
