= Five Dragons Temple =

Taoist temple in China

Coordinates: 34°43′49″N 110°40′55″E

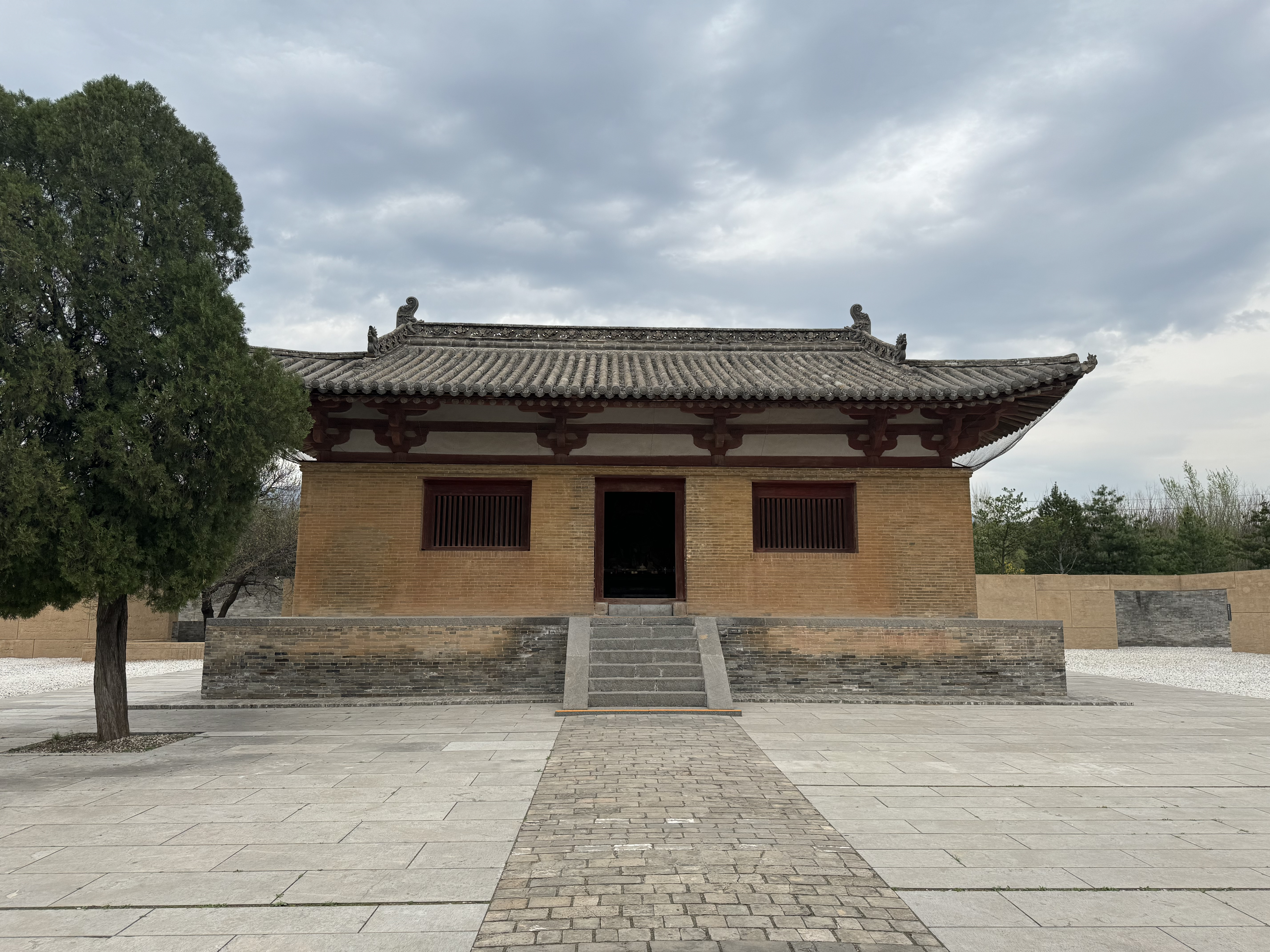
- The Five Dragons Temple

Religion
- Affiliation: Daoist
- Province: Shanxi

Location
- Location: Ruicheng
- Interactive map of Five Dragons Temple

Architecture
- Completed: 833; Tang dynasty

The Five Dragons Temple (simplified Chinese: 五龙庙; traditional Chinese: 五龍庙; pinyin: Wǔ Lóng Miào) is a Taoist temple in Ruicheng, Shanxi Province, China. It is also known as King Guangren's Temple (广仁王庙).

The temple contains China's second oldest dated timber building, the Main Hall. It was built in 833 and is of the Tang dynasty. It measures five bays across and has a hip-gable roof.
