= Logang =

Logang may refer to:

- Logang Union, a union of Khagrachhari District
- Logang massacre, a massacre in Chittagong Hill Tracts, Bangladesh
- Logang, a term used to refer to Logan Paul's following
