= Ruicheng County =

County in Shanxi, China

Ruicheng County 芮城县
- County
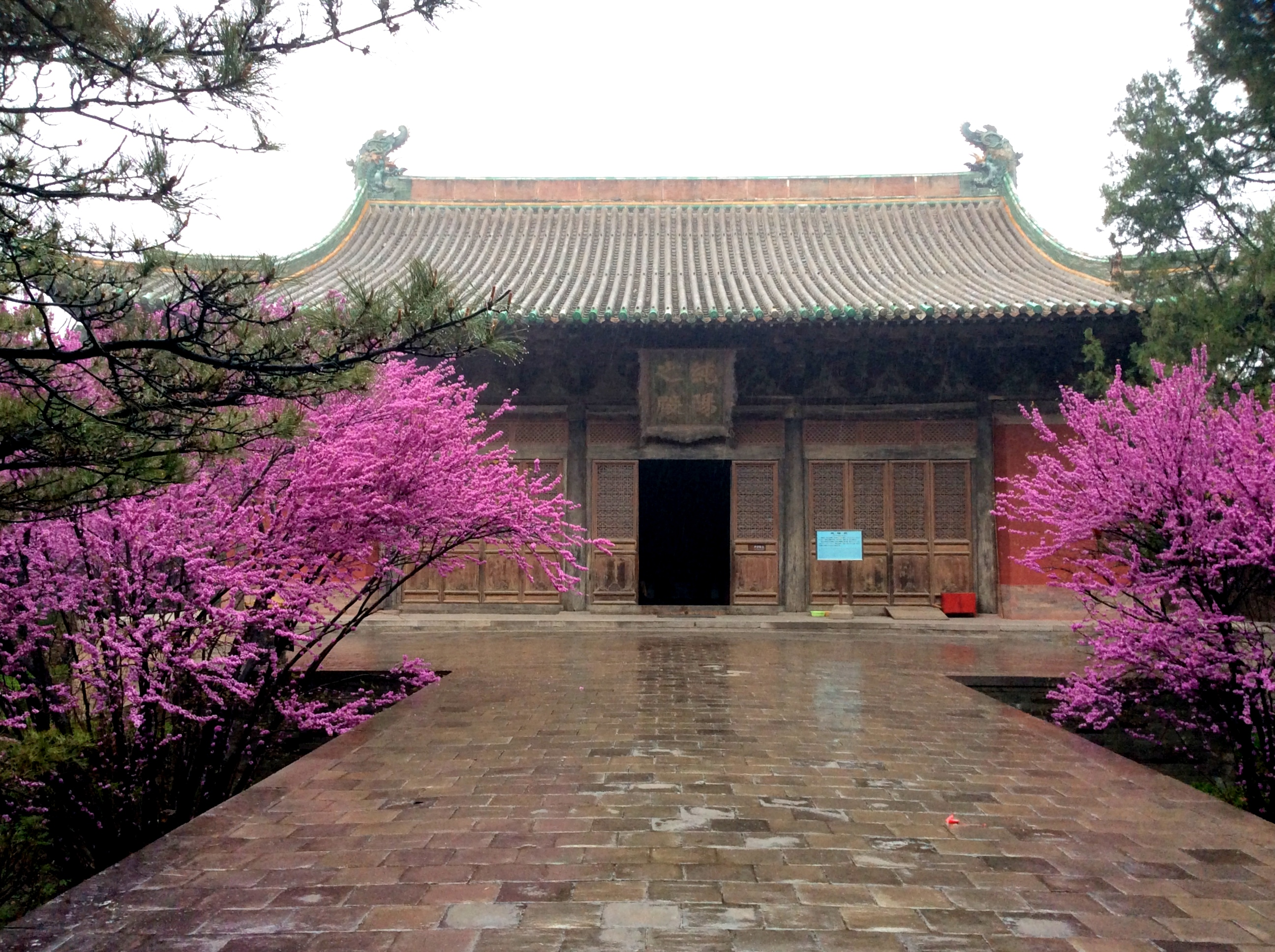
- The Chunyang Hall of the Yongle Gong in Ruicheng County

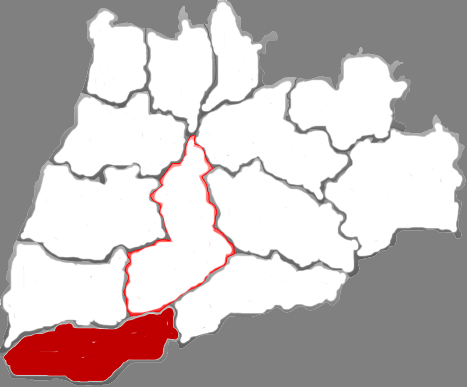
- Location in Yuncheng

- Location of the seat in Shanxi
- Coordinates: 34°42′N 110°37′E
- Country: People's Republic of China
- Province: Shanxi
- Prefecture-level city: Yuncheng

Population (2020)
  - Total: 342,889
- Time zone: UTC+8 (China Standard)
- Website: www.rcx.gov.cn

Ruicheng County (simplified Chinese: 芮城县; traditional Chinese: 芮城縣; pinyin: Ruìchéng Xiàn) is under the administration of the Yuncheng City, in the southwest of Shanxi province, China. It is the southernmost county-level division of Shanxi, with the Yellow River demarcating its border with the provinces of Henan to the south and Shaanxi to the west. The population as of the 2020 census is around 350,000.

Ruicheng is home to Yongle Gong (永乐宫; 永樂宮; Yǒnglè gōng; 'Palace of Eternal Joy'), a Taoist temple complex noted for the wall paintings inside its three main halls. It was moved to Ruicheng in 1959 to preserve it when the Sanmenxia Dam was built, which was expected to put the town of Yongle, the previous location of the temple, under water. The temple is 4 km north of the town centre. The city is also known for its City God Temple and Guangrenwang Temple, the latter of which is the second oldest extant building in China.

The Yellow River lies just south of Ruicheng, and Dayudu (Yu the Great's Crossing) along the river bank is a notable scenic spot. A pumping station on the river doubles as a monument to Yu the Great, the legendary figure credited with controlling the course of the Yellow River and saving many lives in the process.

== Administrative divisions ==
- Fenglingdu town

== Climate ==
Climate data for Ruicheng, elevation 506 m (1,660 ft), (1991–2020 normals, extremes 1981–present)
Month	Jan	Feb	Mar	Apr	May	Jun	Jul	Aug	Sep	Oct	Nov	Dec	Year
Record high °C (°F)	14.7 (58.5)	24.9 (76.8)	29.5 (85.1)	35.4 (95.7)	38.2 (100.8)	40.2 (104.4)	40.3 (104.5)	39.4 (102.9)	38.5 (101.3)	31.7 (89.1)	25.8 (78.4)	20.5 (68.9)	40.3 (104.5)
Mean daily maximum °C (°F)	5.0 (41.0)	9.2 (48.6)	15.4 (59.7)	21.9 (71.4)	26.6 (79.9)	30.9 (87.6)	31.7 (89.1)	30.0 (86.0)	25.4 (77.7)	19.7 (67.5)	12.7 (54.9)	6.5 (43.7)	19.6 (67.3)
Daily mean °C (°F)	−1.3 (29.7)	2.7 (36.9)	8.7 (47.7)	15.0 (59.0)	19.9 (67.8)	24.5 (76.1)	26.2 (79.2)	24.6 (76.3)	19.6 (67.3)	13.3 (55.9)	6.1 (43.0)	0.1 (32.2)	13.3 (55.9)
Mean daily minimum °C (°F)	−6.1 (21.0)	−2.3 (27.9)	3.1 (37.6)	8.6 (47.5)	13.4 (56.1)	18.5 (65.3)	21.6 (70.9)	20.4 (68.7)	15.1 (59.2)	8.4 (47.1)	1.1 (34.0)	−4.7 (23.5)	8.1 (46.6)
Record low °C (°F)	−17.0 (1.4)	−15.9 (3.4)	−11.2 (11.8)	−3.0 (26.6)	−0.1 (31.8)	8.6 (47.5)	13.4 (56.1)	11.0 (51.8)	3.1 (37.6)	−5.5 (22.1)	−13.0 (8.6)	−18.2 (−0.8)	−18.2 (−0.8)
Average precipitation mm (inches)	4.9 (0.19)	7.7 (0.30)	16.4 (0.65)	34.9 (1.37)	53.1 (2.09)	61.0 (2.40)	90.5 (3.56)	75.6 (2.98)	85.3 (3.36)	47.1 (1.85)	22.0 (0.87)	2.9 (0.11)	501.4 (19.73)
Average precipitation days (≥ 0.1 mm)	3.4	3.8	4.6	6.8	8.0	8.4	9.9	9.2	9.8	7.6	5.6	2.3	79.4
Average snowy days	4.4	3.2	1.3	0.2	0	0	0	0	0	0	1.8	2.7	13.6
Average relative humidity (%)	59	58	56	59	61	62	73	76	77	74	70	61	66
Mean monthly sunshine hours	142.5	143.9	180.1	209.9	221.8	218.2	224.5	207.1	165.0	158.4	148.4	149.9	2,169.7
Percentage possible sunshine	45	46	48	53	51	51	51	50	45	46	48	49	49
Source: China Meteorological Administration all-time February high

== Agriculture ==
Apples are to be found in abundance in Ruicheng, being the most popular variety of fruit grown by local farmers.
