= Jiayang Coal Railway =

Railway line in Sichuan, China

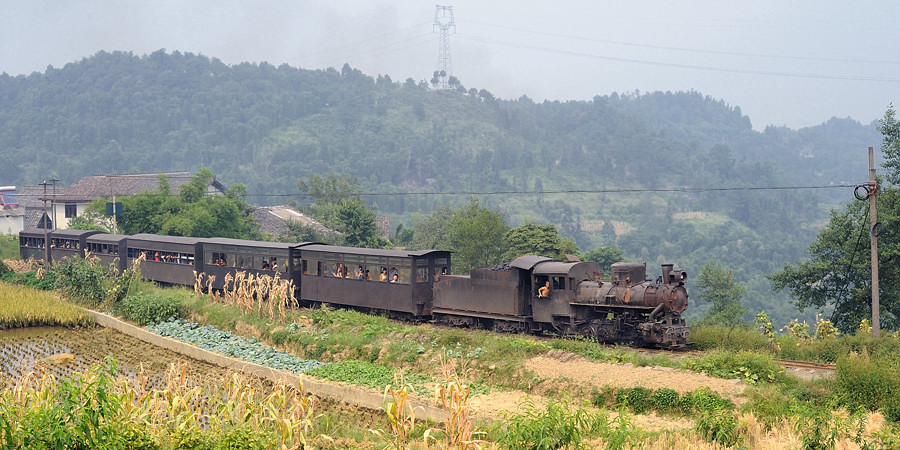
C2-10 locomotive with passenger train between Caiziba and Xianrenjiao

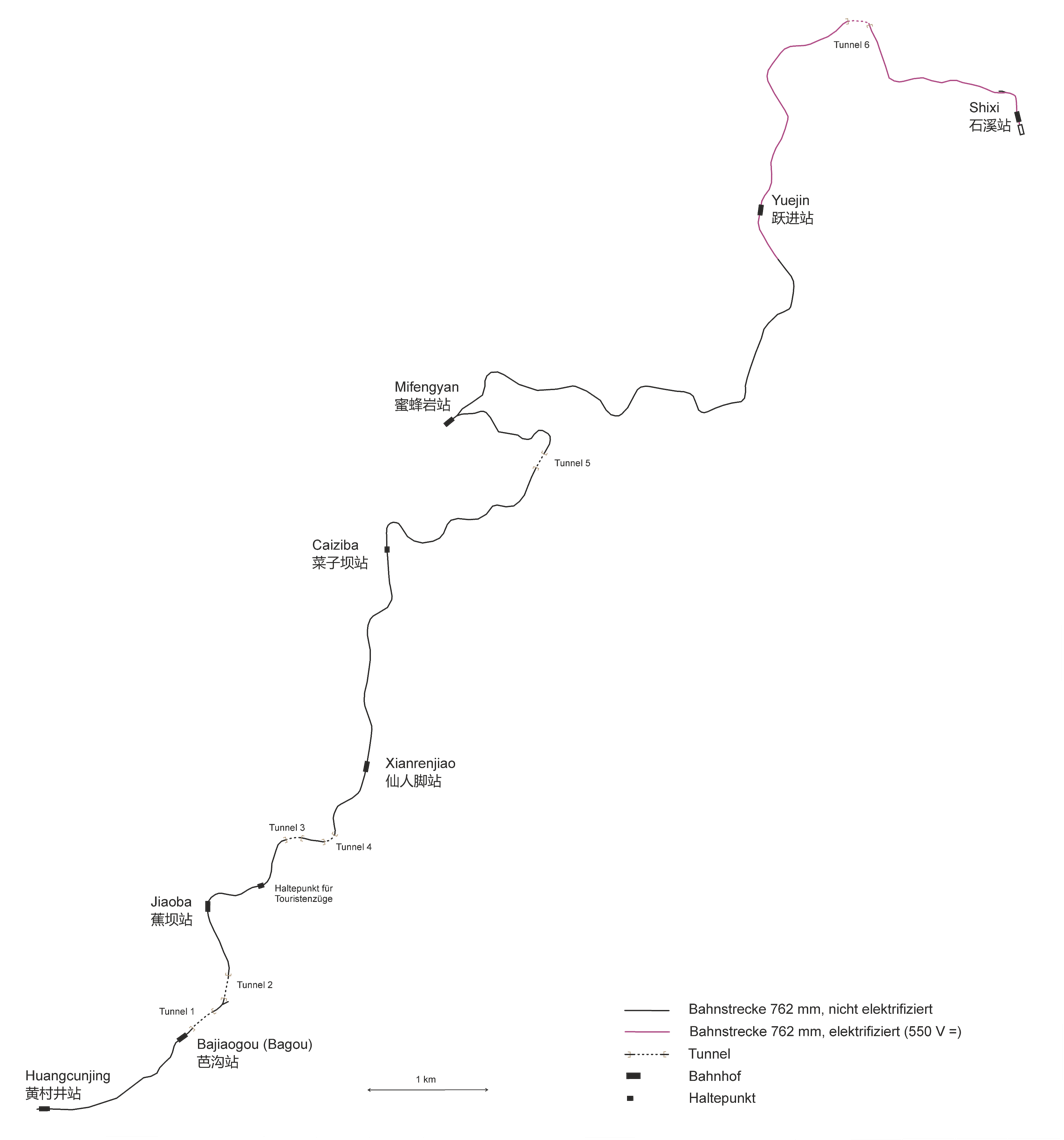
Map of the Jiayang Coal Railway

The Jiayang Coal Railway, also known as Shixi–Huangcunjing Railway or Shibanxi Railway, is a narrow-gauge railway in Sichuan in Qianwei County near Leshan, China.

== History ==
A coal mine was established at Bajiaogou (芭蕉沟) in 1938. The coal was initially transported in manually-propelled trucks on a 600 mm (1 ft 11 5/8 in) gauge railway track to Mamio, where the coal was loaded onto barges on the Mabian river.

To make transport more efficient, the construction of a 19.84-kilometre (12.33 mi) long narrow-gauge line to Shixi, with a gauge of 600 mm (1 ft 11 5/8 in), began in 1958. The line was formally inaugurated on 12 July 1959. In 1960 it was re-gauged to 762 mm (2 ft 6 in). The station at Mifengyan is part of a zig zag.

Initially, coal wagons were used to carry both coal and passengers. In the 1960s, trains with separate coal and passenger rolling stock became available. In 1975, six pairs of passenger-only trains operated daily, independently from the coal transport, but that was reduced to four passenger trains per day over the years.

Additional mines near Jiaoba and Yuejin, Sichuan, were also connected to the railway line. In 2000, the Yuejin–Shixi line was electrified with 550V DC. The transport of coal on the remainder was discontinued in 2003, but passenger trains still operated, due to the lack of a road connection. In May 2004, the local government requested that the line be maintained as a heritage railway, as more and more tourists became interested in it. In 2010 it was listed as national cultural heritage. Tickets for tourists cost ¥80, but locals are only charged ¥0.5.

== Rolling stock ==
Initially converted lorries were used, and later steam locomotives (probably of the RJ type) were added. After re-gauging, larger ZM16-4-C2 steam locomotives were used. These are still being used on the non-electrified section. In 2001, the Numbers 07, 08, 09, 10 und 14 were still operational.

Two SJ380A diesel engines with numbers 01 and 02 were purchased and commissioned in 1991. They were already taken out of use in 1996. For the electrified part of the line between Shixi and Yuejin three ZL 14-7 electrical locomotives with four wheels each were purchased in the year 2000.

Coal was initially transported in wagons with a bamboo superstructure, and later with a wooden superstructure. Today, two-axle steel wagons are used. Two-axle carriages with open windows are used for passenger service, and there are four-axle carriages available for checked-in luggage and tourist trains. Their windows are covered by transparent plastic and some of them are painted in brown.

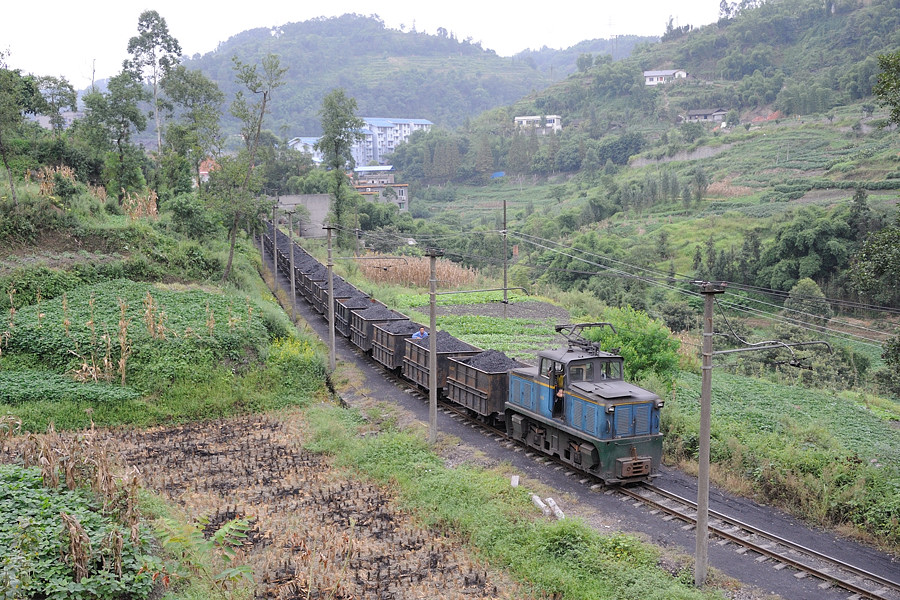
ZL 14-7 003 between Yuejin and Shixi, 2011

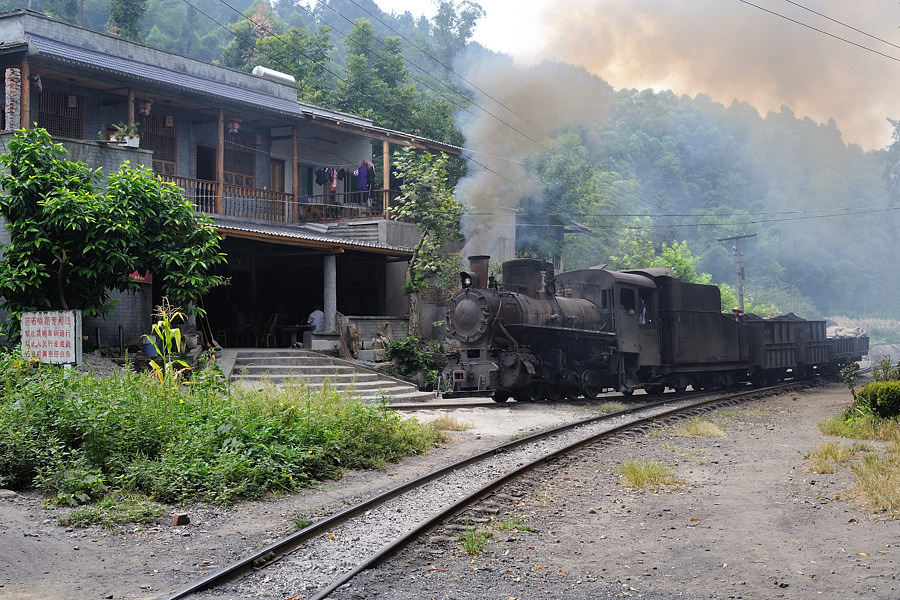
C2 07 with auxiliary train leaving Mifengyan zig zag station, 2011

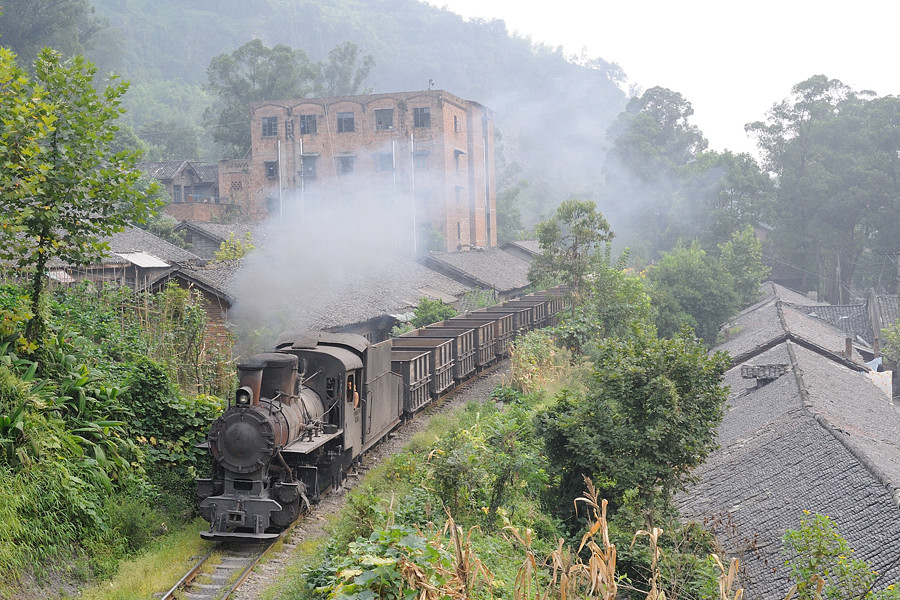
C2 07 with empty coal wagons in Bajiaogou, 2011

== Operation ==
Four pairs of passenger trains per day pass the full length of the line within 75 minutes in one direction. Additionally, one or two pairs of trains are used daily for coal transport between Huangcunjing and Shixi. Special trains for tourists are available on request. For these, only tourist carriages are being used. One or two tourist carriages are also added to normal passenger trains. All of these trains are pulled by ZM16-4 steam locomotives, even on the electrified section of the line. The locomotives are refilled in Yuejin station on their way to Huangcunjing.

Coal is transported between Yuejing and Shixi by electric locomotives. One ZL 14-7 goes forward and backwards between the loading and unloading stations.

== Literature ==
- Zhang Xiang: Jiayang Narrow Gauge Steam. 2011, ISBN 978-7-80220-633-5.
- Gao Luchuan: Jiayang Narrow Gauge Steam - A living fossil of the industrial revolution 1959~2009. China Photographic Publishing House, 2009, ISBN 978-7-80236-323-6.
- David Akast: A steam-powered taste of old China. South China Morning Post 2014: https://www.scmp.com/magazines/post-magazine/article/1400541/blasts-past-steam-powered-taste-old-china
