= Mengyuan railway station (Shaanxi) =

Railway station in Weinan, China

Mengyuan 孟塬
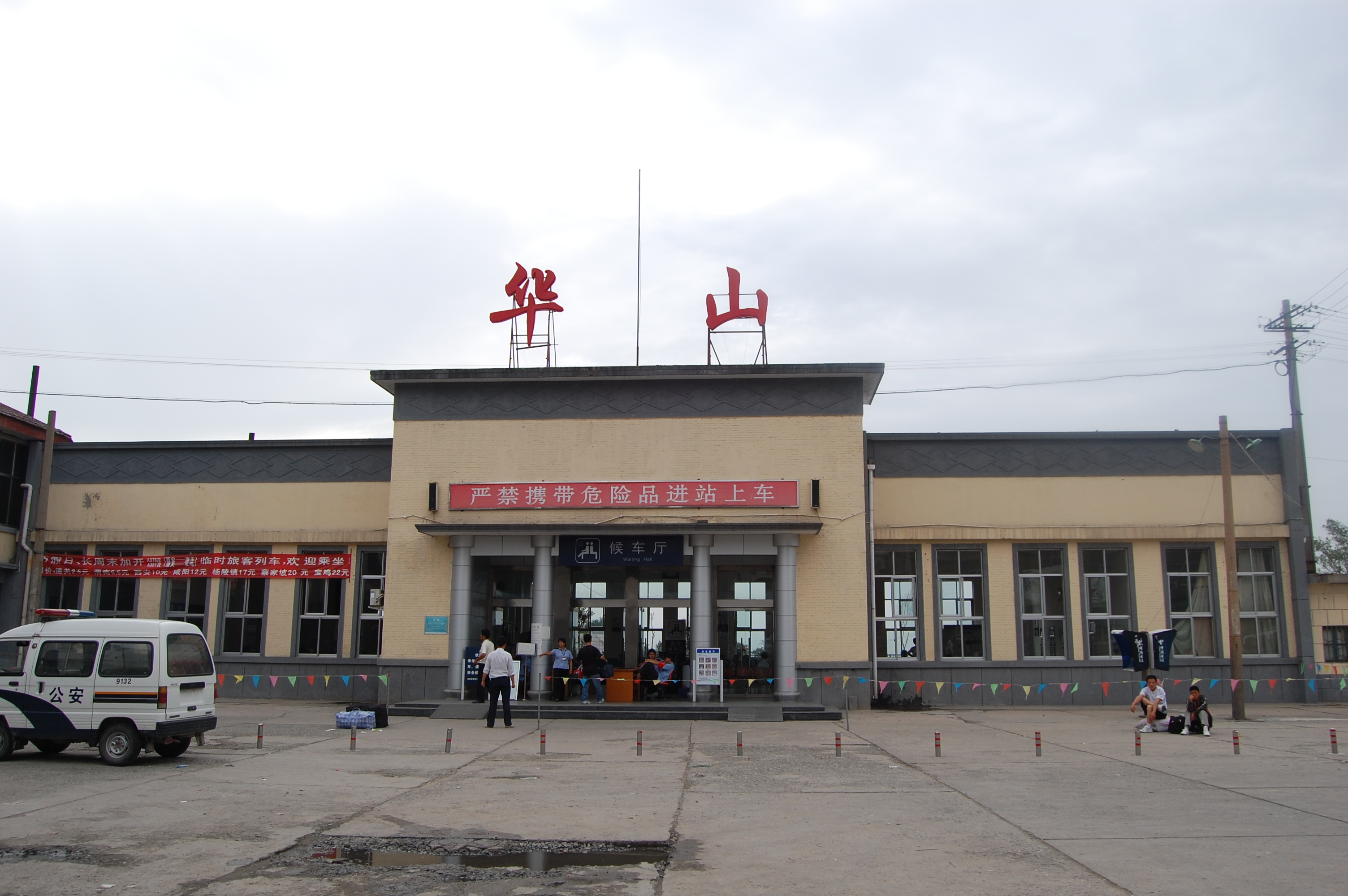

General information
- Location: Huayin, Weinan, Shaanxi; China
- Coordinates: 34°33′21″N 110°08′09″E
- Operator: CR Xi'an
- Line: Longhai Railway
- Platforms: 4 (1 island platform and 2 side platforms)
- Tracks: 5

Other information
- Station code: 39338 (TMIS code); HSY (telegraph code); HSH (Pinyin code)
- Classification: Class 2 station (二等站)

History
- Opened: 1960
- Former names: Huashan (Chinese: 华山), 1997–2021
Location
- Location within China

Mengyuan railway station (Chinese: 孟塬站) is a railway station of Longhai railway located in Huayin, Weinan, Shaanxi, China.

== History ==
The station was opened in 1960 as part of the rerouting of the Longhai railway for the construction of the Sanmenxia Dam. It was originally called Mengyuan but was renamed Huashan (Chinese: 东泉店站) in April 1997. It returned to its original name on 20 July 2021. The former Huashan West station has been renamed Huashan.

Preceding station	China Railway	Following station
Tongguan towards Lianyungang East	Longhai railway	Weinan towards Lanzhou
Fenglingdu towards Datong	Datong–Puzhou railway	Terminus
