= Datong railway station =

Railway station in Datong, China

Datong 大同
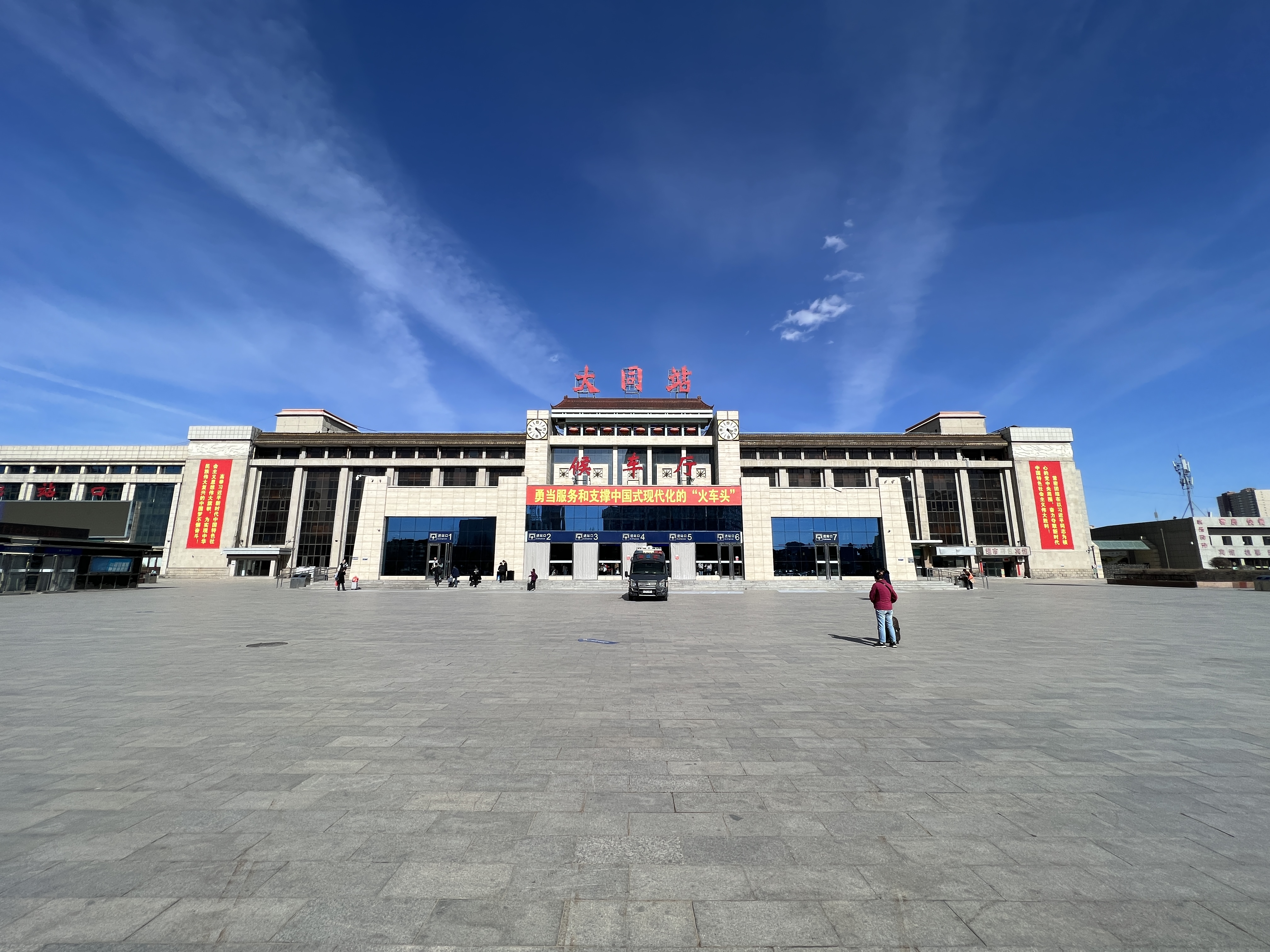
- Datong railway station

General information
- Location: Chengqu District, Datong, Shanxi; China
- Coordinates: 40°7′8″N 113°17′47″E
- Operated by: Taiyuan Railway Bureau, China Railway Corporation
- Lines: Jingbao Railway, Tongpu Railway, Daqin Railway
- Platforms: 3

History
- Opened: 1914
Location

The Datong railway station (Chinese: 大同站; pinyin: Dàtóng Zhàn) is a railway station of Beijing–Baotou railway and Datong–Puzhou railway. The station located in Datong, Shanxi, China.

== History ==
The station opened in 1914.

== See also ==
- Datong South railway station

Preceding station	China Railway	Following station
Yanggao towards Beijing North	Beijing–Baotou railway	Gushan towards Baotou
Terminus	Datong–Puzhou railway	Pingwang towards Mengyuan
