= Ningwu County =

Ningwu County 宁武县
- County
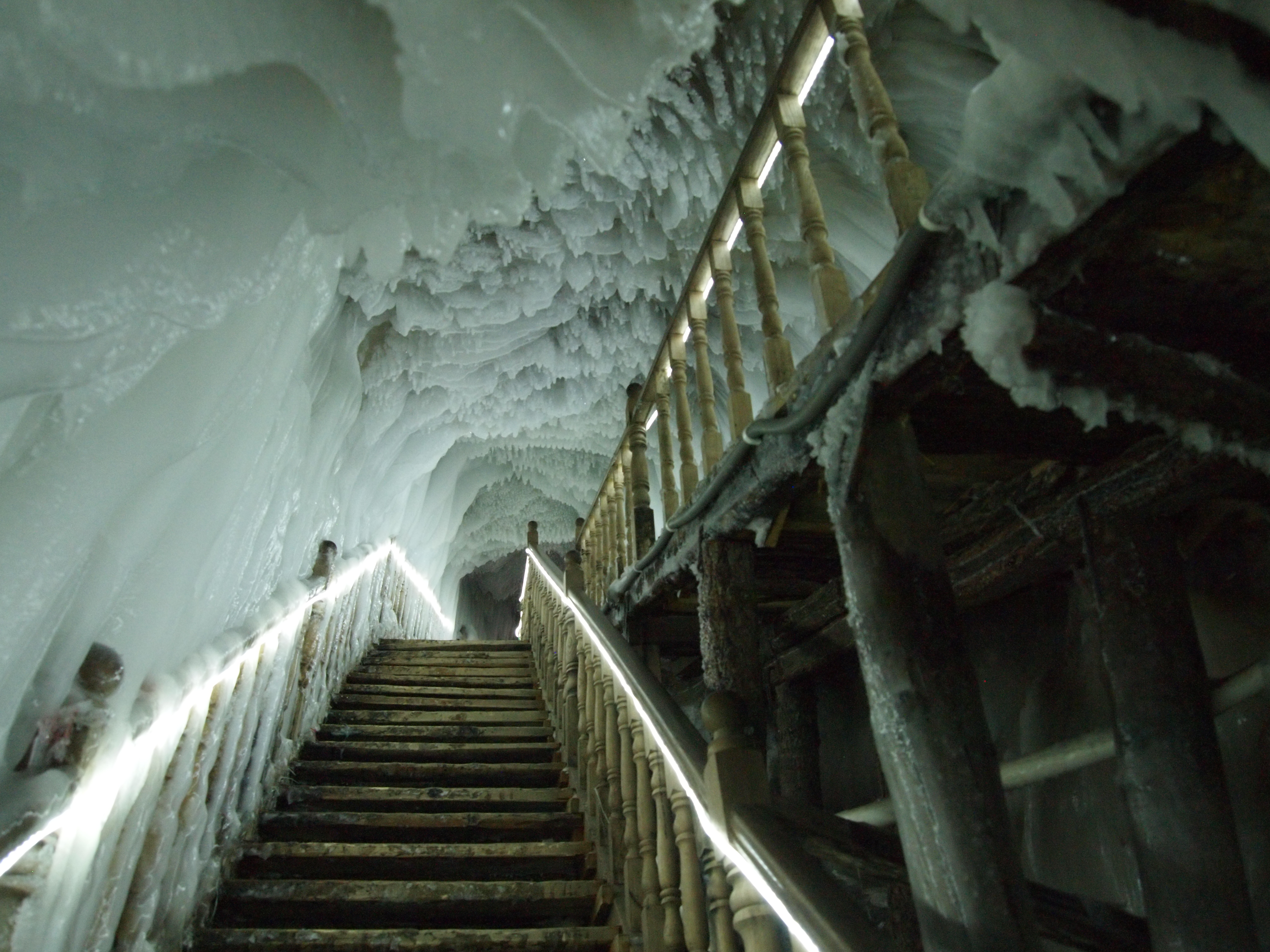
- Wannian Ice Cave (万年冰洞)

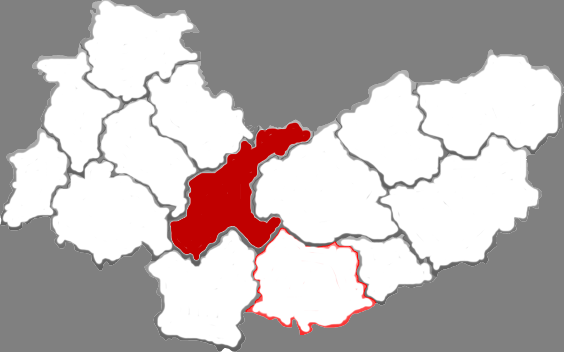
- Location in Xinzhou

- Location of the seat in Shanxi
- Coordinates: 39°00′19″N 112°18′08″E
- Country: People's Republic of China
- Province: Shanxi
- Prefecture-level city: Xinzhou
- Time zone: UTC+8 (China Standard)

Ningwu County (simplified Chinese: 宁武县; traditional Chinese: 寧武縣; pinyin: Níngwǔ Xiàn) is a county under the administration of Xinzhou in Shanxi province, China.

== History ==
Present-day Ningwu County includes the site of the former seat of Loufan County, now part of Taiyuan Prefecture.

In October 1937, the city was occupied by Japanese forces. 4,800 out of the 7,000 residents of Ningwu were massacred by the Japanese.

== Climate ==
Climate data for Ningwu, elevation 1,437 m (4,715 ft), (1991–2020 normals, extremes 1981–2010)
Month	Jan	Feb	Mar	Apr	May	Jun	Jul	Aug	Sep	Oct	Nov	Dec	Year
Record high °C (°F)	13.0 (55.4)	20.0 (68.0)	23.3 (73.9)	33.9 (93.0)	31.8 (89.2)	36.7 (98.1)	35.2 (95.4)	32.6 (90.7)	32.8 (91.0)	26.2 (79.2)	21.8 (71.2)	15.9 (60.6)	36.7 (98.1)
Mean daily maximum °C (°F)	−2.4 (27.7)	1.4 (34.5)	7.7 (45.9)	15.4 (59.7)	21.1 (70.0)	25.0 (77.0)	26.2 (79.2)	24.3 (75.7)	19.8 (67.6)	13.5 (56.3)	5.9 (42.6)	−0.8 (30.6)	13.1 (55.6)
Daily mean °C (°F)	−8.4 (16.9)	−4.8 (23.4)	1.6 (34.9)	9.0 (48.2)	15.0 (59.0)	19.0 (66.2)	20.7 (69.3)	18.9 (66.0)	14.0 (57.2)	7.6 (45.7)	0.1 (32.2)	−6.5 (20.3)	7.2 (44.9)
Mean daily minimum °C (°F)	−12.8 (9.0)	−9.5 (14.9)	−3.5 (25.7)	3.2 (37.8)	8.9 (48.0)	13.2 (55.8)	15.9 (60.6)	14.3 (57.7)	9.2 (48.6)	2.9 (37.2)	−4.2 (24.4)	−10.7 (12.7)	2.2 (36.0)
Record low °C (°F)	−25.1 (−13.2)	−24.2 (−11.6)	−20.8 (−5.4)	−11.0 (12.2)	−2.2 (28.0)	1.2 (34.2)	7.4 (45.3)	4.5 (40.1)	−1.2 (29.8)	−10.8 (12.6)	−21.6 (−6.9)	−25.6 (−14.1)	−25.6 (−14.1)
Average precipitation mm (inches)	2.5 (0.10)	4.5 (0.18)	8.7 (0.34)	21.5 (0.85)	34.9 (1.37)	68.0 (2.68)	112.6 (4.43)	107.8 (4.24)	61.5 (2.42)	24.9 (0.98)	9.4 (0.37)	2.4 (0.09)	458.7 (18.05)
Average precipitation days (≥ 0.1 mm)	2.9	3.9	4.7	5.9	8.1	12.0	14.2	12.8	10.0	6.8	4.7	3.1	89.1
Average snowy days	6.2	6.6	6.5	2.9	0.4	0	0	0	0	1.5	5.7	6.2	36
Average relative humidity (%)	45	42	38	37	39	51	65	69	63	53	47	45	50
Mean monthly sunshine hours	205.2	200.9	239.5	256.6	281.2	252.7	246.2	230.3	216.3	225.8	205.9	200.7	2,761.3
Percentage possible sunshine	68	66	64	64	63	57	55	55	59	66	69	69	63
Source: China Meteorological Administration
