= Datong–Puzhou railway =

Railway line in Shanxi, China

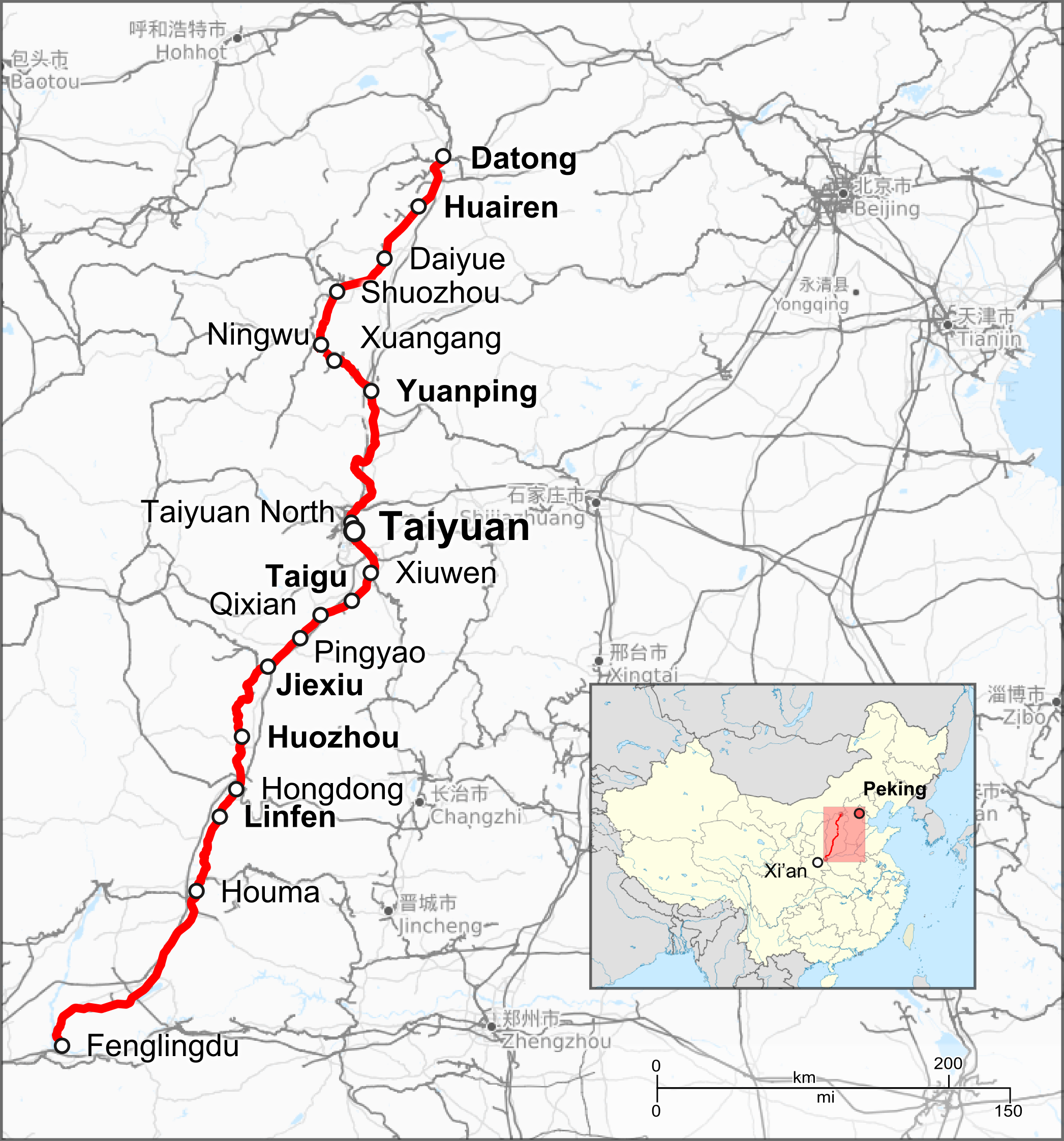

Overview
- Owner: China Railway
- Termini: Datong; Fenglingdu near Xi'an

History
- Opened: 1940

Technical
- Line length: 864 km (537 mi)
- Character: main line
- Track gauge: 1,435 mm (4 ft 8 1/2 in) standard gauge
- Electrification: 25 kV, 50 Hz AC

The Datong–Puzhou or Tongpu railway (simplified Chinese: 同蒲铁路; traditional Chinese: 同蒲鐵路; pinyin: tóngpǔ tiělù), is a major trunkline railroad in northern China, and the main axial railway of Shanxi Province. The railway is located entirely within Shanxi and diagonally bisects the province from Datong in the northeast to Fenglingdu, near the village of Puzhou, in the southwest corner. The line is named after Datong and Puzhou, and has a total length of 865 km (537 mi). The line is often referred to by its northern and southern halves with Taiyuan, the provincial capital as the midpoint. Southern Tongpu railway from Taiyuan to Fenglingdu is 513 km (319 mi) in length and was built from 1933 to 1935. The Northern Tongpu railway, from Datong to Taiyuan is 351 km (218 mi) in length and was built from 1933 to 1940. Major cities and towns along route include Datong, Huairen, Shuozhou, Ningwu, Yuanping, Xinzhou, Taiyuan, Yuci, Taigu, Qi County, Pingyao, Huozhou, Hongdong, Linfen, Houma and Fenglingdu.

The section between Yuanping and Huairen is quadruple track, but the third/forth track is straight north–south rather than serving Shuozhou and Ningwu. This track is currently part of Datong–Xi'an passenger railway.

== History ==
The Tongpu railway was built during Yan Xishan's administration of Shanxi Province. Yan initially appealed to the central government of the Republic of China for assistance to build a railway in Shanxi, and after being denied funding in 1928, embarked on his own railway building project. He hired a German surveyor team to plan the line. In 1930, when Yan lost power during the Central Plains War, the railway project temporarily halted. In 1932, Yan regained control of Shanxi and formed the Jinsui (Shanxi–Suiyuan) Army Construction Corp to build the line as a 2 ft 6 in (762 mm) narrow gauge railway, which the German team recommended to save cost. Construction began simultaneously on the North and South Tongpu Lines in May 1933. On August 1, 1935, the Taiyuan to Yuanping section began operation. By August 1937, the North Tongpu Line had reached within 8 km (5.0 mi) of Datong but the fall of the city to the invading Japanese during the Second Sino-Japanese War halted construction. In 1939, the Japanese used forced labor to work on the remainder of the line. Guerilla activity limited travel speed on the line to 25–35 km/h (16–22 mph).

After the end of World War II, Yan regained control of the Shanxi and the Tongpu railway. During the ensuing Chinese Civil War, Communist forces and partisans sabotaged the North Tongpu Line, rendering it unusable until after the conflict. Reconstruction began in November 1949 and the entire line was converted into standard gauge and reopened to traffic in August 1951. In 1957, work began on a bypass between Ningwu and Xuangang through the Duanjialing Tunnel, which at 3,345 m (10,974 ft) was the second longest railway tunnel in China at the time. The tunnel was completed in 1959. In the early 1980s, the North Tongpu Line underwent electrification to increase coal transport capacity.

== Rail connections ==
- Datong: Beijing–Baotou railway, Datong–Qinhuangdao railway
- Ningwu: Ningwu–Kelan railway, Ningwu–Jingle railway
- Yuanping: Beijing–Yuanping railway
- Taiyuan: Shijiazhuang–Taiyuan railway, Taiyuan–Jiaozuo railway, Shijiazhuang–Taiyuan high-speed railway
- Hongdong: Shanxi–Henan–Shandong railway
- Houma: Houma–Xi'an railway, Houma–Yueshan railway

== See also ==
- List of railways in China
