= Jiuyuangang Northern Dynasties Mural Tomb =

Cemetery in Shanxi, China

The Jiuyuangang Northern Dynasties Mural Tomb is located northeast of Xiashe Village, Lancun Township, Xinfu District, Xinzhou, Shanxi Province, China. It is one of the tombs in the Jiuyuangang Tomb Group, a Shanxi provincial cultural relics protection unit. The Jiuyuangang Northern Dynasties Mural Tomb is the first Northern Dynasties tomb discovered in Xinzhou. As the tomb had been robbed many times, few artifacts were unearthed, and the epitaph had also been stolen, so the identity of the tomb owner cannot be determined. Based on the scale of the tomb, experts inferred that the owner was a core member of the Gao clan of Northern Qi. The surviving murals in the tomb cover 200 square meters. The hunting scenes discovered on the east and west walls of the tomb passage cover 70 square meters, making them the largest Northern Dynasties tomb hunting murals discovered in China. The mural on the north wall of the tomb passage depicts a building using inclined bracket arms and double-column dougong, which is of great significance for the study of Chinese architectural history. The Jiuyuangang Northern Dynasties Mural Tomb was shortlisted for the final selection of the 2013 Top Ten Archaeological Discoveries in China, but was not selected.

== Excavation ==
In 2013, Jing Yaozhong, a master's student in archaeology at Shanxi University, discovered a robbed mural tomb in a cornfield northeast of Xiashe Village, Lancun Township, Xinfu District, Xinzhou, Shanxi Province, during a field survey. Because the tomb contained murals, Jing believed that it was of great value. He informed Lang Baoli, a professor in the Department of Archaeology at Shanxi University, and reported the discovery to the Shanxi Provincial Institute of Archaeology. In March 2013, the Shanxi Provincial Institute of Archaeology sent an expert team to Xinzhou to investigate the mural tomb. In late June 2013, the National Cultural Heritage Administration approved a rescue excavation. The Shanxi Provincial Institute of Archaeology and the Xinzhou Cultural Relics Management Office jointly formed an archaeological team. Qu Chuanfu, director of the academic committee of the Shanxi Museum and a research fellow, served as the executive leader of the excavation. Because the tomb had been severely robbed, only many fragments of pottery figurines, a small number of pottery and porcelain fragments, and dozens of iron coffin nails were unearthed. During the excavation, more than 200 square meters of murals were cleaned, the murals were preliminarily reinforced, and on-site protection was carried out. The murals in the passageway and tomb passage had already been damaged by tomb robbers. Based on the characteristics of the murals, experts determined that the tomb dated to the Northern Dynasties. The epitaph had already been stolen, making it impossible to determine the identity of the tomb owner. The human bones found in the tomb were poorly preserved, so the age and sex of the tomb owner could not yet be determined from the remains.

On December 24, 2013, twelve well-known Chinese archaeologists inspected the Jiuyuangang Northern Dynasties Mural Tomb. Xin Lixiang, former director and research fellow of the Field Archaeology Department of the National Museum of China, stated that, in terms of scale and form, the tomb was close in rank to the Wanzhang Tomb in Ci County, Hebei Province. Scholars have speculated that the owner of the Wanzhang Tomb was Gao Yang, an emperor of Northern Qi, which suggests that the owner of the Jiuyuangang Northern Dynasties Mural Tomb was likely a core member of the Gao clan of Northern Qi. Xin Lixiang commented that the Jiuyuangang Northern Dynasties Mural Tomb is of extraordinary significance for the study of late Northern Dynasties social life, painting art, and the history of ancient Chinese architecture. He also stated that it shows Xinzhou was historically an important area of Hu-Han interaction and ethnic coexistence. On December 25, 2013, the Shanxi Provincial Institute of Archaeology organized a public open day at the excavation site of the Jiuyuangang Northern Dynasties Mural Tomb, with dozens of media outlets participating.

== Unearthed artifacts ==
Because it had been robbed many times, few artifacts were unearthed from the Jiuyuangang Northern Dynasties Mural Tomb. During the cleaning of the tomb, archaeologists found some fragments of grave goods, all of which had been displaced from their original positions. The artifacts unearthed from the tomb included a large number of pottery figurine fragments, dozens of iron coffin nails, a small number of pottery fragments, and a small number of porcelain fragments. Few human bones were unearthed, and they were poorly preserved, so the age and sex of the tomb owner could not yet be determined from the remains. The epitaph had also been stolen. According to local villagers, the epitaph was stolen and sold more than ten years earlier, and it bore the three characters “Great General”; another account says that it contained the characters “Xiurong Great General”.

== Murals ==
The mural on the north wall of the tomb passage depicts a grand wooden building with a hip roof. Directly above the roof is a brazier, with a monster having an animal head and bird body on each side. Six maidservants stand beneath the eaves. The wooden building is five bays wide and uses inclined bracket arms. The building in the painting also uses double-column dougong, the first such example discovered in a mural. Previously, scholars generally believed that dougong used in Northern Dynasties architecture basically did not project outward, and that although dougong in early Tang architecture projected outward, it was very simple. The building in the Jiuyuangang Northern Dynasties Mural Tomb uses complex dougong and projecting bracket arms, changing previous understanding of the history of ancient Chinese architecture. Xin Lixiang even said that the gate tower shown in the mural “could rewrite the history of Chinese architecture”.

The mural on the ceiling of the corridor depicts a fearsome beast. The mural on the ceiling of the burial chamber is a celestial chart and is relatively well preserved. The surviving mural above the east wall of the burial chamber depicts a three-legged crow. Based on excavated tombs from the Northern and Southern Dynasties, experts inferred that the murals in the burial chamber were divided into three levels: from top to bottom, a celestial chart, images of the Four Symbols, namely the Azure Dragon, White Tiger, Vermilion Bird, and Black Tortoise, and scenes of ox carts, saddled horses, and riders.

Scholars have commented that although these murals do not represent the highest level of Northern Dynasties painting, they are extremely rare materials for the study of Northern Dynasties painting. They reflect features of late Northern Dynasties painting, such as long-scroll composition and the use of mountains and trees to separate figures. The supernatural images in the murals are valuable materials for studying the spiritual world of ancient Chinese people. Long-scroll hunting scenes are very rare in Chinese archaeology. The style of the murals and the figures depicted in them both reflect characteristics of steppe peoples. During the excavation, the archaeological team carried out on-site protection of the murals and conducted preliminary reinforcement. In January 2014, Qu Chuanfu, the executive leader of the archaeological team, said that there were plans to remove and preserve the Jiuyuangang murals.[3] In October 2014, the mural removal and conservation plan passed expert review. In January 2015, the murals in the tomb passage and corridor were removed and transferred to the Shanxi Museum for conservation, and restoration began in early 2018.

== Interpretations ==
Zhang Jinlong, a distinguished professor at Capital Normal University, believes that the owner of the Jiuyuangang Northern Dynasties Mural Tomb was very likely Kudi Gan.

== See also ==
- Xu Xianxiu Tomb
