= Yuanping West railway station =

Railway station in Datong, Shanxi, China

Yuanping West 原平西站

General information
- Location: Yuanping, Xinzhou, Shanxi; China
- Coordinates: 38°44′17.35″N 112°40′4.61″E
- System: Passenger station
- Owner: China Railway Taiyuan Group
- Lines: Datong–Xi'an high-speed railway; Datong–Zhangjiakou high-speed railway

History
- Opened: 28 September 2018; 7 years ago
Location

Yuanpingxi (Yuanping West) railway station (Note: Chinese: 原平西站; pinyin: Yuánpíng xī zhàn) is a railway station of the Datong–Xi'an high-speed railway and the Jining–Datong–Yuanping high-speed railway, located in Shahuangcun, Xizhen township, Yuanping, Xinzhou, Shanxi, China, opening on 28 September 2018.

== Notes ==
Preceding station	China Railway High-speed	Following station
Yanmenguan towards Datong South	Datong–Xi'an high-speed railway	Xinzhou West towards Xi'an North
