= Xinzhou West railway station =

Railway station in Shanxi, China

Xinzhou West 忻州西
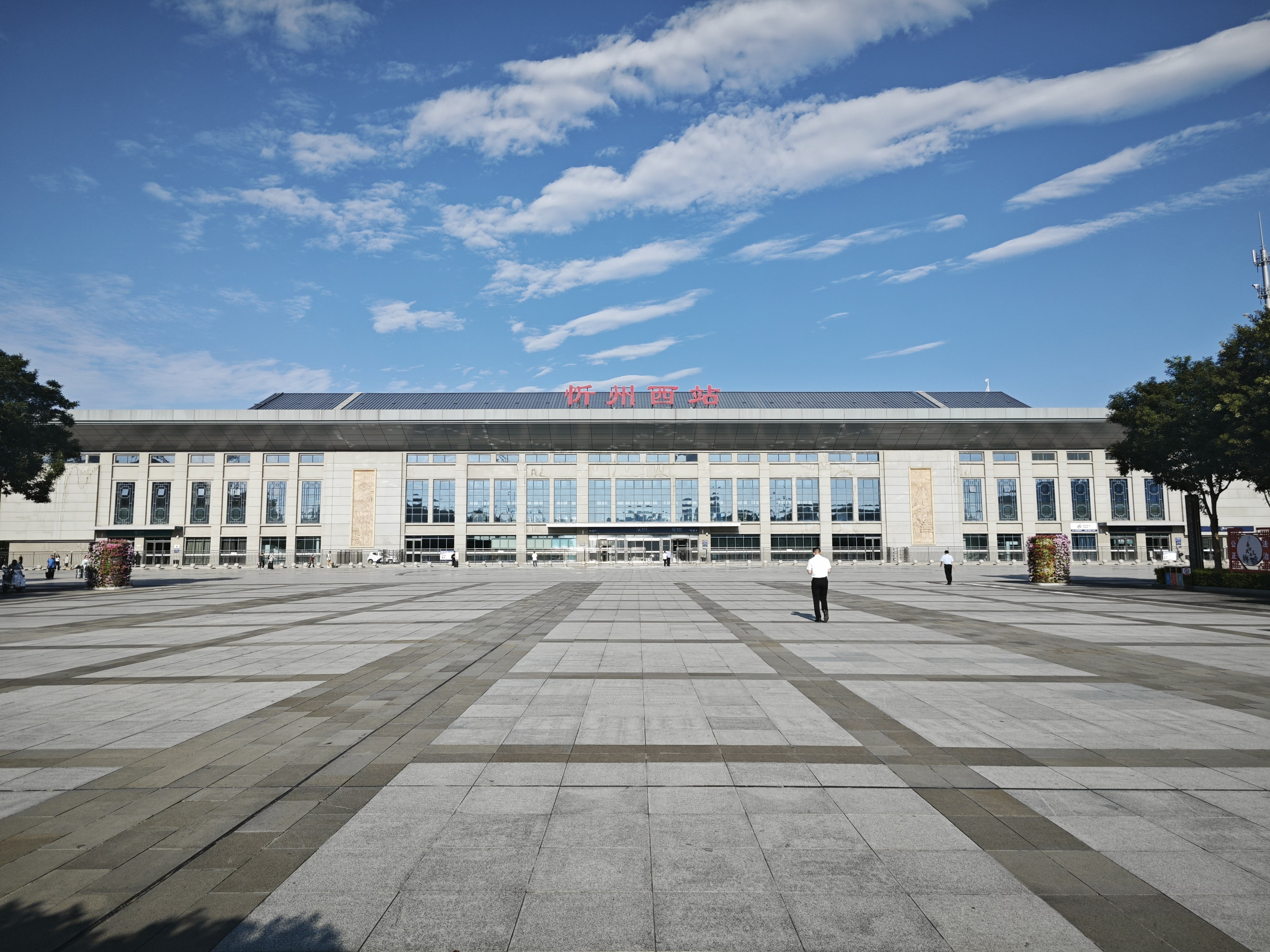
- Xinzhouxi railway station

General information
- Location: Xinfu District, Xinzhou, Shanxi; China
- Coordinates: 38°26′32.47″N 112°41′9.62″E
- Operated by: China Railway High-speed
- Lines: Datong–Xi'an high-speed railway Xiong'an–Xinzhou high-speed railway (planned)
- Platforms: 3

History
- Opened: 28 September 2018; 7 years ago
Location

Xinzhou West railway station is a railway station in Xinfu District, Xinzhou, Shanxi, China. It opened with the Datong–Xi'an high-speed railway on 28 September 2018. It will be the western terminus of the planned Xiong'an–Xinzhou high-speed railway.

Preceding station	China Railway High-speed	Following station
Yuanping West towards Datong South	Datong–Xi'an high-speed railway	Yangqu West towards Xi'an North
