= Nancheng =

Nancheng may refer to the following places in China:

== Pinyin Romanization ==
- Nancheng County (南城县), Fuzhou, Jiangxi
- Nancheng District (南城区), Dongguan, Guangdong
- Nancheng, Dehua County (南埕镇), in Dehua County, Fujian
- Nancheng, Lianyungang (南城镇), town in Xinpu District, Lianyungang, Jiangsu
- Nancheng, Xiajin County (南城镇), town in Xiajin County, Shandong

Subdistricts (南城街道)

- Nancheng Subdistrict, Nanchuan District, in Nanchuan District, Chongqing
- Nancheng Subdistrict, Tongliang County, in Tongliang County, Chongqing
- Nancheng Subdistrict, Longyan, in Xinluo District, Longyan, Fujian
- Nancheng Subdistrict, Yingcheng, in Yingcheng City, Xiaogan Hubei
- Nancheng Subdistrict, Anlu, in Anlu City, Xiagoan, Hubei
- Nancheng Subdistrict, Zaoyang, in Zaoyang City, Hubei
- Nancheng Subdistrict, Shulan, in Shulan City, Jilin
- Nancheng Subdistrict, Heze, in Mudan District, Heze, Shandong
- Nancheng Subdistrict, Shan County, Shandong, in Shan County, Shandong
- Nancheng Subdistrict, Shuozhou, in Shuocheng District, Shuozhou, Shanxi
- Nancheng Subdistrict, Xinzhou, in Xinfu District, Xinzhou, Shanxi
- Nancheng Subdistrict, Yuanping, in Yuanping City, Shanxi
- Nancheng Subdistrict, Yuncheng, in Yanhu District, Yuncheng, Shanxi
- Nancheng Subdistrict, Luzhou, in Jiangyang District, Luzhou, Sichuan
- Nancheng Subdistrict, Yibin, in Cuiping District, Yibin, Sichuan
- Nancheng Subdistrict, Aksu, Xinjiang, in Aksu, Xinjiang
- Nancheng Subdistrict, Taizhou, Zhejiang, in Huangyan District, Taizhou, Zhejiang

== Other Romanizations ==
- Nanzheng County (南鄭), a county in and former name of Hanzhong, Shaanxi
