= Huairen East railway station =

Railway station in Shuozhou, Shanxi

Huairen East 怀仁东
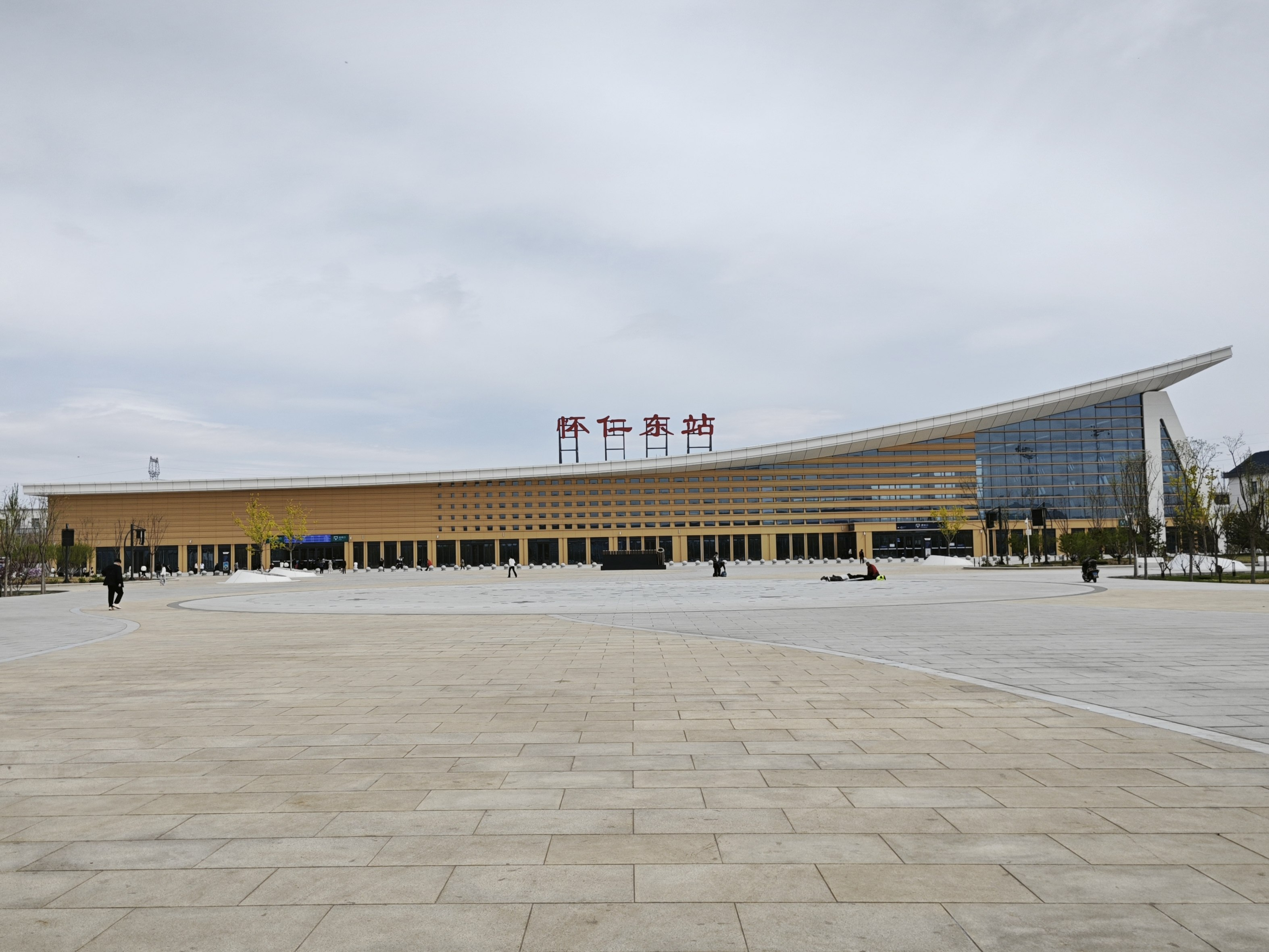

General information
- Location: Huairen, Shuozhou, Shanxi; China
- Coordinates: 39°47′31.43″N 113°9′24.24″E
- Lines: Hanjialing–Yuanping railway; Datong–Xi'an high-speed railway
- Platforms: 2

Other information
- Station code: 27301 (TMIS)

History
- Opened: 2014; 11 years ago
Location

Huairen East railway station (Chinese: 怀仁东站; pinyin: Huáiréndōng zhàn) is a railway station in Huairen, Shuozhou, Shanxi, China. It is an intermediate stop on the Hanjialing–Yuanping railway, on a section which is also used by the Datong–Xi'an high-speed railway. The station has two side platforms. On 1 May 2019, electric multiple unit services were introduced which cut the journey time to Taiyuan South railway station to under two hours.

== See also ==
- Huairen railway station

Preceding station	China Railway High-speed	Following station
Datong South Terminus	Datong–Xi'an high-speed railway	Yingxian West towards Xi'an North
