= Xiong'an–Xinzhou high-speed railway =

High-speed rail line in China

Xiong'an–Xinzhou high-speed railway 雄忻高速铁路
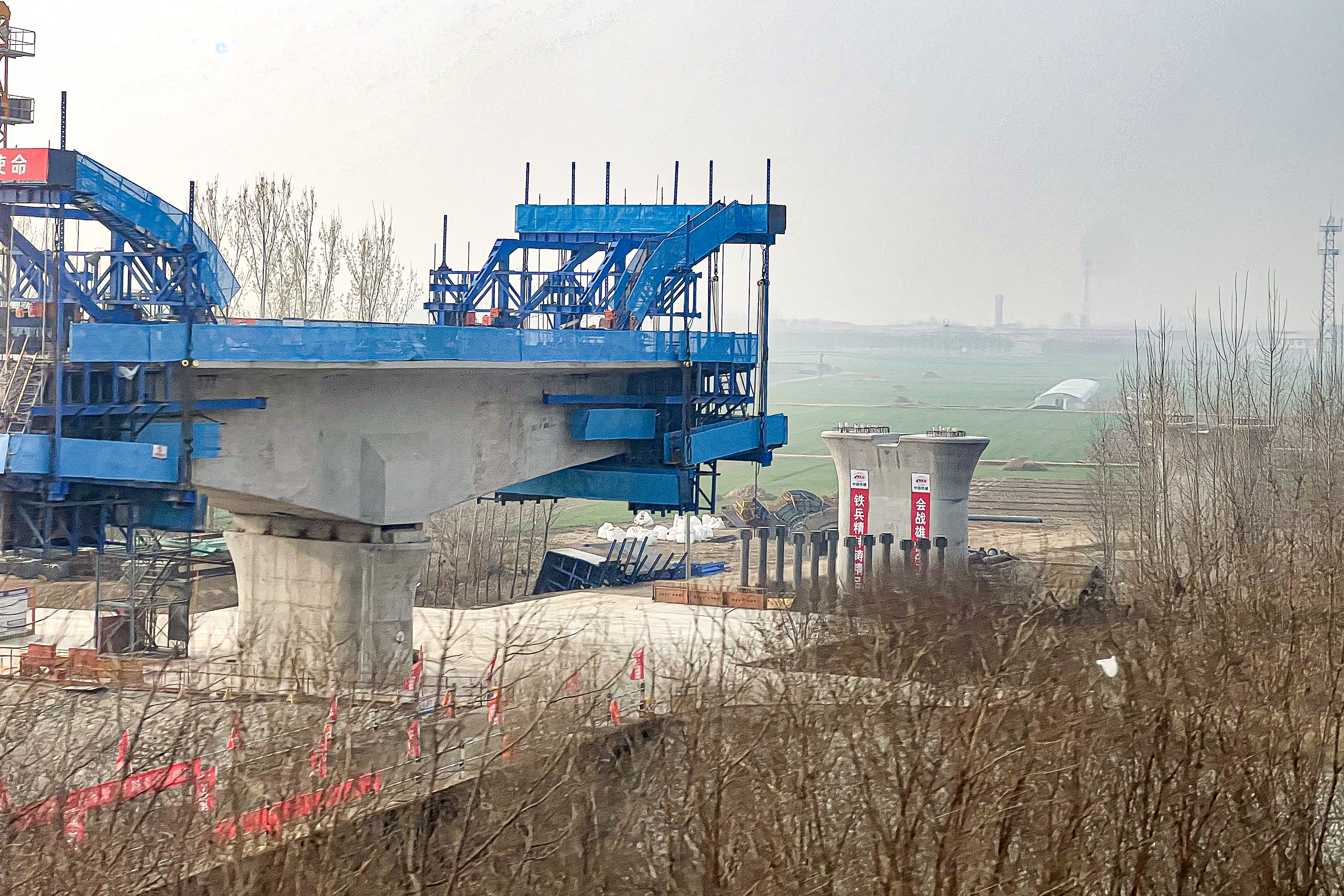
- Construction site in Suncun Township, Baoding in March 2024

Overview
- Other name(s): Xiongxin high-speed railway
- Status: Under Construction
- Locale: Hebei, Shanxi
- Termini: Xiong'an; Xinzhou West
- Stations: 13

Service
- Type: High-speed rail
- System: China Railway

Technical
- Line length: 342 km (213 mi)
- Number of tracks: 2
- Track gauge: 1,435 mm (4 ft 8 1/2 in) standard gauge
- Electrification: 25 kV AC
- Operating speed: 350 kilometres per hour (220 mph)

The Xiong'an–Xinzhou high-speed railway or Xiongxin HSR (Chinese: 雄忻高速铁路; pinyin: Xióngxīn Gāosù Tiělù) is a 342 kilometres (213 mi) long high-speed railway under construction between Xiong'an in Hebei province and Xinzhou in Shanxi province, China. It will connect to the Datong–Xi'an high-speed railway. The railway will form part of the Beijing–Kunming corridor of the 8+8 HSR Grid. Construction started on 1 October 2022.

== Stations ==
Station Name		CR Connections	Distance km
English	Chinese	CR Connections	Distance km
Xiong'an	雄安		
Xiong'an West	雄安西		
Xiaoli	小里		
Baoding East	保定东		
Baoding South	保定南		
Tangxian	唐县		
Wangdu North	望都北		
Quyang	曲阳		
Fuping	阜平		
Wutaishan	五台山		
Wutaixian	五台县		
Dingxiang North	定襄北		
Xinzhou West	忻州西		
