= Mansheng Wang =

Chinese calligrapher and painter

Wang Mansheng (Chinese: 王满晟), also known as Mansheng Wang, was born in Taiyuan, Shanxi Province, China in 1962. He is a Chinese calligrapher and painter. Following graduation in 1985 from the Chinese Department of Shanghai's Fudan University, where he majored in classical literature, he worked for over a decade as an editor, director and producer at China Central Television in Beijing. He has devoted himself full time to painting, calligraphy and writing since his move to New York in 1996. His paintings, poetry and essays often reflect on the literature, landscapes and images of China's past as they relate to the present. His influences include traditional Chinese literati art, the Chinese classics, Buddhist art, and the landscapes of the Hudson Valley, where he resides. Wang's interest in art began when he was a child during the Chinese Cultural Revolution. In addition to using Chinese brush and ink, in his artistic process he fashions brushes out of and paints with reeds from the Hudson River, and makes ink from black walnuts. Wang's calligraphy and paintings have been shown worldwide, including in China, Japan, Hong Kong, Europe and the United States. His work is held in private and public collections, the latter including the Allen Memorial Art Museum; Baltimore Museum of Art; Brooklyn Museum; Charles Chu Asian Art Reading Room, Connecticut College; Huntington Library, Art Museum, and Botanical Gardens; Philadelphia Museum of Art; Princeton University Art Museum; Shanxi Museum; and Yale University Art Gallery.
