= Daiyang village =

Daiyang 待阳村
- Village
- Country: People's Republic of China
- Province: Shanxi
- Prefecture-level city: Xinzhou
- County: Dingxiang
- Town: Jinchang (晋昌镇)

Daiyang village (zh: 待阳村) is an administrative subdivision of the Jinchang town of Dingxiang, a suburb of Xinzhou, Shanxi, China. To the south, it abuts the Muma River; to the north, the Thai Ha Jin Chang railway and Xinfu road. Dingxiang proper lies west of the village; the urbanization trickles to a halt heading east.

In 2016, Daiyang village had 4188 acres of farmland supporting 2972 people, of whom 1085 were farmers and more than 2,000 registered to live elsewhere, and 75 acres of developed land.

In 2009 the village produced 3.5 million kilograms of grain, worth 23.7 million yuan or, 5415 yuan net per capita.

As of 2016, Dingxiang County Government had proposed a 90 million-yuan project for a new village center, called "Yang village", in mid-socialist style. The six new buildings east of Chang Avenue are expected to contain a new community center and resolve this village's housing shortage, especially offering affordable housing to seventy elder pensioners. The construction project will also require a street reconstruction with new pavement, landscaping, and lighting, and taxes from the new residents should reduce the costs of public utilities such as water, electricity, and education for current residents as well.
