= Taiyuan (disambiguation) =

Taiyuan is the capital city of Shanxi, China.

Taiyuan may also refer to:

== Locations in China ==
- Taiyuan, Chongqing (太原), a town in Pengshui Miao and Tujia Autonomous County, Chongqing
- Taiyuan, Hengyang (台源镇), a town of Hengyang County, Hunan,
- Taiyuan Township (太源乡), a township in Nanfeng County, Jiangxi

== Historical eras ==
- Taiyuan (251–252), era name used by Sun Quan, emperor of Eastern Wu
- Taiyuan (376–396), era name used by Emperor Xiaowu of Jin

== See also ==
- Taiyuan station (disambiguation)
- Northern Thai people, also known as Tai Yuan
- Thái Nguyên, the capital city of Thái Nguyên Province in northern Vietnam
  - Thái Nguyên Province
