= Beijing–Kunming corridor =

Railway line in China

Beijing-Kunming corridor 京昆通道

Overview
- Status: Partly operational
- Locale: People's Republic of China
- Termini: Beijing Chongqing (branch); Kunming

Service
- Type: High-speed rail
- Operator(s): China Railway High-speed

Technical
- Track gauge: 1,435 mm (4 ft 8 1/2 in) standard gauge
- Electrification: 50 Hz 25,000 V
- Operating speed: 200 to 350 km/h (124 to 217 mph)

The Beijing–Kunming corridor is a high-speed rail corridor running from Beijing to Kunming in Yunnan Province. The main route passes from Beijing through Xiong'an, Xinzhou, Taiyuan, Xi'an and Chengdu before reaching Kunming. Apart from the main route, a branch line runs from Beijing to Taiyuan through Zhangjiakou and Datong, and a spur line from Chongqing connects to Kunming.

== Route ==
=== Beijing–Xiong'an–Xinzhou–Taiyuan–Kunming (main route) ===
Section Railway line	Description	Designed speed (km/h)	Length (km)	Construction start date	Open date
Beijing–Xiong'an intercity railway	Intercity railway connecting Beijing with Xiong'an.	250-350	92.783	2016-12-30	2019-09-26 (Beijing section); 2020-12-27 (Hebei section)
Xiong'an–Xinzhou high-speed railway	HSR connecting Xiong'an with Xinzhou.	350	340	2022-10-01	Expected in 2030
Xinzhou–Taiyuan–Xi'an; Datong–Xi'an high-speed railway (section)	HSR connecting Xinzhou, Taiyuan with Xi'an. Part of longer route extending to Datong.	250	570	2009-12-03	2014-07-01
Xi'an-Chengdu high-speed railway	HSR connecting Xi'an with Chengdu.	250	663	2010-11-01	2017-12-06
Chengdu–Yibin; Chengdu–Kunming high-speed railway	HSR connecting Chengdu, Zigong and Yibin	350	261	2018-12-21	2023-12-26

=== Chongqing–Kunming spur line ===
Section Railway line	Description	Designed speed (km/h)	Length (km)	Construction start date	Open date
Chongqing–Kunming high-speed railway	HSR connecting Chongqing and Kunming	350	698.96	29 September 2019	

=== Beijing–Zhangjiakou–Datong–Taiyuan branch line ===
Section Railway line	Description	Designed speed (km/h)	Length (km)	Construction start date	Open date
Beijing–Zhangjiakou intercity railway	Intercity Railway connecting Beijing with Zhangjiakou.	250-350	174	2014	2019-12-30
Zhangjiakou–Datong; Datong–Zhangjiakou high-speed railway	HSR connecting Zhangjiakou with Datong.	250	137	2015-12	2019-12-30
Datong–Taiyuan; Datong–Xi'an high-speed railway (section)	HSR connecting Datong with Taiyuan.	200-250	859	2009-12-03	2019-12-30

== See also ==
- High-speed rail in China
