= Shanxi Bronze Museum =

Museum in Taiyuan, Shanxi, China

- SC: 山西青铜博物馆
- TC: 山西青銅博物館
- Location: Taiyuan
- Opened: July 27, 2019
- Type: Bronze-themed museum

The Shanxi Bronze Museum (simplified Chinese: 山西青铜博物馆; traditional Chinese: 山西青銅博物館) is a bronze-themed museum located in the Changfeng Business District of Taiyuan. It the branch museum of Shanxi Museum.

On July 27, 2019, the Shanxi Bronze Museum was officially opened in Taiyuan, Shanxi Province. The museum is China's first provincial-level bronze-themed museum. It has a display area of 11,000 square meters.
