= Datong–Xi'an high-speed railway =

Railway line in China

Datong–Xi'an high-speed railway 大西客运专线
- Datong-Xi'an HSR

Overview
- Other name: Daxi Passenger Dedicated Line
- Status: In operation
- Locale: Shanxi & Shaanxi, China
- Termini: Datong South; Xi'an North

Service
- Type: High-speed rail
- System: China Railway
- Operator(s): CR Taiyuan Group & CR Xi'an Group

Technical
- Line length: 859 km (534 mi)
- Number of tracks: Ballastless track（Fanjiazhuang crossing loop-Xi'an North） traditional track (Xijianhe crossing loop-Taiyuan South and Fanjiazhuang crossing loop-Datong South)
- Track gauge: 1,435 mm (4 ft 8 1/2 in) standard gauge
- Minimum radius: 7,000 m (23,000 ft)（Common） 5,500 m (18,000 ft) （Hard）
- Electrification: 25 kV AC
- Operating speed: 250 km/h (160 mph) reserved: 350 km/h (220 mph) (Yuanping–Xi'an) 300 km/h (190 mph) (Datong–Yuanping）
- Signalling: ABS
- Train protection system: CTCS-2
- Maximum incline: Normal: 2%; difficult: 3%

Datong–Xi'an high-speed railway or Daxi HSR (simplified Chinese: 大西客运专线; traditional Chinese: 大西客運專線; pinyin: Dà–Xī kèyùn zhuānxiàn) is a dual-track, electrified, high-speed rail line operated by CR Taiyuan Group and CR Xi'an Group between Datong, Shanxi and Xi'an, Shaanxi. It has a length of 859 km (534 mi) through the provinces of Shanxi and Shaanxi Province, traversing the north-south axis of the former, and will accommodate trains traveling at speeds up to 250 km/h (160 mph). Travel time between the two terminal cities will be reduced from 16.5 hours to about three hours.

== Route ==
The high speed rail line will run down the length of Shanxi Province from Datong in the north through Shuozhou, Xinzhou, the provincial capital Taiyuan, Jinzhong, Linfen and Yuncheng. It crosses the Yellow River at Yongji, enter Shaanxi and reach Xian via Weinan and Lintong. As of 2022, most of the high-speed line is finished, but the section between Huairen East and Yuanping West runs on the 153-kilometre (95 mi)-long Hanjialing–Yuanping railway, a line built mainly for freight with a design speed of 160 kilometres per hour (99 mph) that was opened on 29 March 2014 to bypass a section of the Datong–Puzhou railway. In future passenger traffic will run on a section of the new Jining–Datong–Yuanping high-speed railway that has been officially under construction next to the line from Datong South to Yuanping West since June 2020. Another short section of main line runs through Taiyuan East and Taiyuan.

The whole line now forms part of the Beijing–Kunming corridor of the 8+8 HSR Grid, now under development. The section between Xi'an and Xinzhou (where the proposed Xiong'an–Xinzhou high-speed railway—Xiongxin HSR—would branch off to Xiong'an) forms part of its main line, while the section between Xinzhou and Datong forms part of the Beijing–Zhangjiakou–Datong–Taiyuan branch.

Together with the Shijiazhuang–Taiyuan high-speed railway, the Taiyuan-Xi'an section of the Datong–Xi'an passenger railway provides a potential more direct route for high-speed passenger trains between Beijing and Xi'an (and points west) than the usual route via Zhengzhou (1,092 km (679 mi) via Taiyuan vs. 1,212 km (753 mi)). However, as of early 2015, this route appears to be slower than the one via Zhengzhou, and does not seem to be used by any direct Beijing-Xi'an trains. Instead, some services run from Beijing via Taiyuan to the southwestern Shanxi (mostly Yuncheng), while others run between Taiyuan and Xi'an.

== History ==
Construction began on 3 December 2009 and was expected to cost ¥96.3 billion. The line was scheduled to be completed by 2013 or 2014. The Taiyuan-Xi'an section of the railway was opened on 1 July 2014; the Taiyuan-Yuanping section was opened on 28 September 2018; and the Datong-Yuanping section is currently not newly constructed but using quadruple tracks of the northern section of the Datong–Puzhou railway between Yuanping West and Huairen East. These services commenced on 1 May 2019. In 2023, CR issued a tender to increase the speed of the line to support the construction of the Xiong'an-Xinzhou high-speed railway, but the target speed is still unknown.
