= Lancun =

Lancun may refer to these places in China:

- Lancun Township, Hunan, Mayang Miao Autonomous County, Hunan
- Lancun Township, Shanxi, Xinfu District, Xinzhou, Shanxi
- Lancun Subdistrict, Jimo District, Qingdao, Shandong
