= Yuci railway station =

Railway station in Jinzhong, Shanxi, China

Yuci 榆次
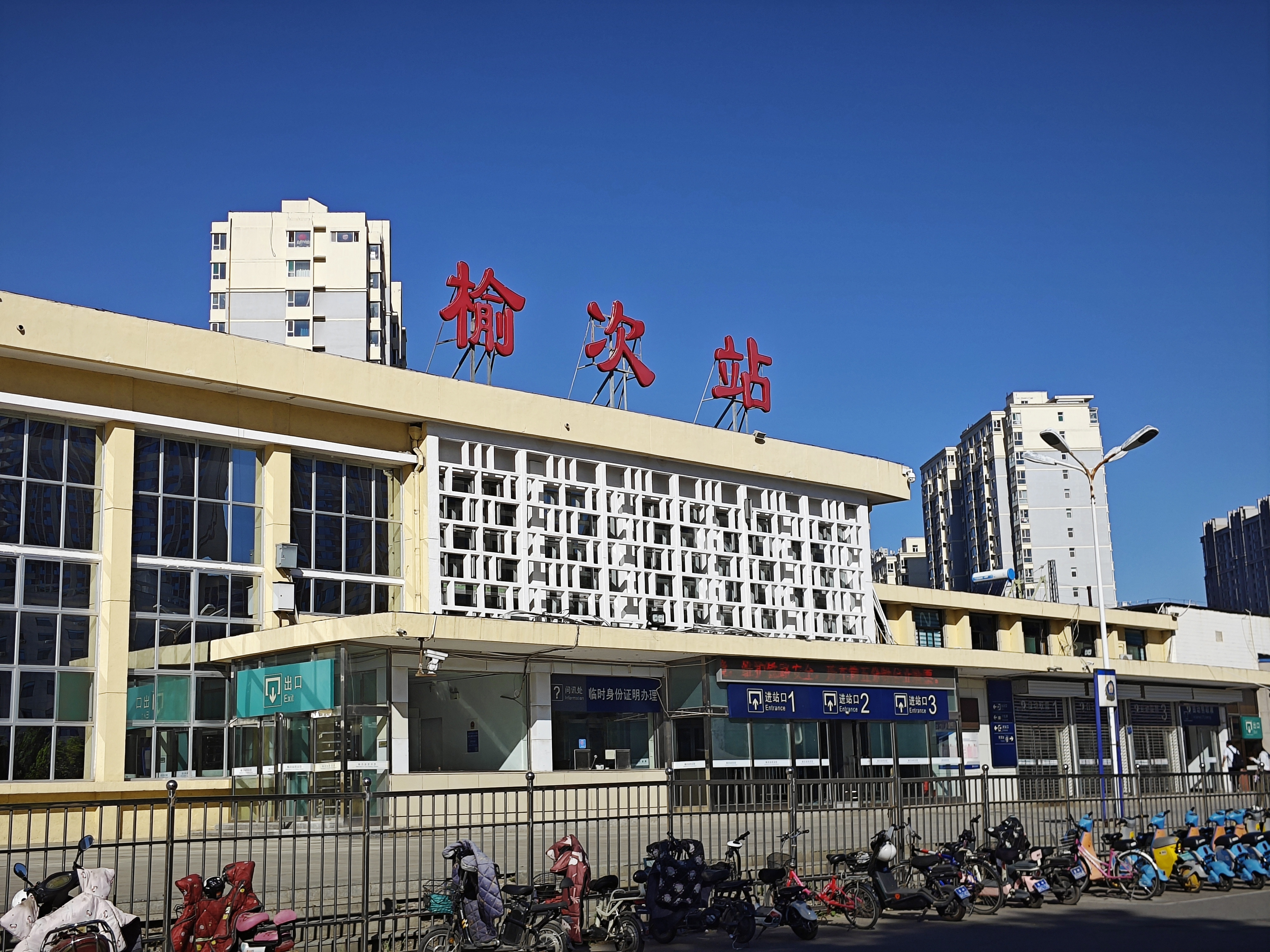
- The station building in May 2024

General information
- Location: Yuci District, Jinzhong, Shanxi; China
- Coordinates: 37°41′45″N 112°43′31″E
- Operator: China Railway Taiyuan Group
- Lines: Shijiazhuang–Taiyuan railway; Datong–Puzhou railway; Taiyuan–Jiaozuo railway; Taiyuan–Zhongwei–Yinchuan railway; Taiyuan southwest ring railway

Other information
- Station code: 26420 (TMIS code); YCV (telegraph code); YCI (pinyin code)
- Classification: First-class station

History
- Opened: October 1907 (original station)

Key dates
- 5 December 1979: Present passenger station opened
Location

Yuci railway station (Chinese: 榆次站; pinyin: Yúcì zhàn) is a railway station in Yuci District, Jinzhong, Shanxi, China. It is operated by China Railway Taiyuan Group. Classified as a first-class station, it handles both passenger and freight traffic and is one of the 43 principal marshalling yards in China's railway network. Five trunk railways—the Shijiazhuang–Taiyuan, Taiyuan–Zhongwei–Yinchuan, Datong–Puzhou and Taiyuan–Jiaozuo railways, and the Taiyuan southwest ring railway—converge on the station complex.
