= Chengdu–Yibin high-speed railway =

High-speed rail line in China

Chengdu–Yibin high-speed railway 成宜高速铁路

Overview
- Status: In operation
- Termini: Chengdu East; Yibin
- Stations: 12

Service
- Operator(s): China Railway Chengdu Group

Technical
- Line length: 261 km (162 mi) (full line); 176 km (109 mi) (Chengdu to Zigong section)
- Track gauge: 1,435 mm (4 ft 8 1/2 in)
- Operating speed: 250 km/h (155 mph) (Chengdu–Tianfu); 350 km/h (217 mph) (Tianfu–Yibin)

The Chengdu–Yibin high-speed railway (abbreviated as Chengyi HSR) is a high-speed railway in China. It runs between Chengdu and Yibin via Chengdu Tianfu International Airport. It forms part of the Beijing–Kunming corridor. The section south of Yibin will constitute part of the Chongqing–Kunming high-speed railway, now under construction.

== History ==
The section from Chengdu to Tianfu Airport was approved in October 2017. The whole line was approved on 14 January 2019.

On 26 March 2023, the bridges of the entire Chengdu–Zigong–Yibin high-speed railway were completed. On 10 July, the track laying of the Chengdu-Zigong-Yibin High-speed Railway was completed. On 19 November, it entered the operation test stage. On 26 December, the Chengdu–Yibin high-speed railway was officially opened for operation.

== Stations ==
Station name	Chinese	Metro transfers/connections
Chengdu East	成都东	2 7
Tianfu	天府	18 19 (U/C)
Sanchahu	三岔湖	
Tianfu Airport	天府机场	18
Ziyang West	资阳西	
Zizhong West	资中西	
Weiyuan	威远	
Zigong	自贡	
Yantan	沿滩	
Nanxi North	南溪北	
Yibin East	宜宾东	
Yibin	宜宾	
