= Taiyuan Station =

Taiyuan Station may refer to:

- Taiyuan railway station (Shanxi), in Taiyuan, Shanxi, China
  - Taiyuan East railway station
  - Taiyuan South railway station
- Taiyuan railway station (Taiwan), in Taichung, Taiwan
