= Yuanping =

Yuanping 原平市
- County-level city
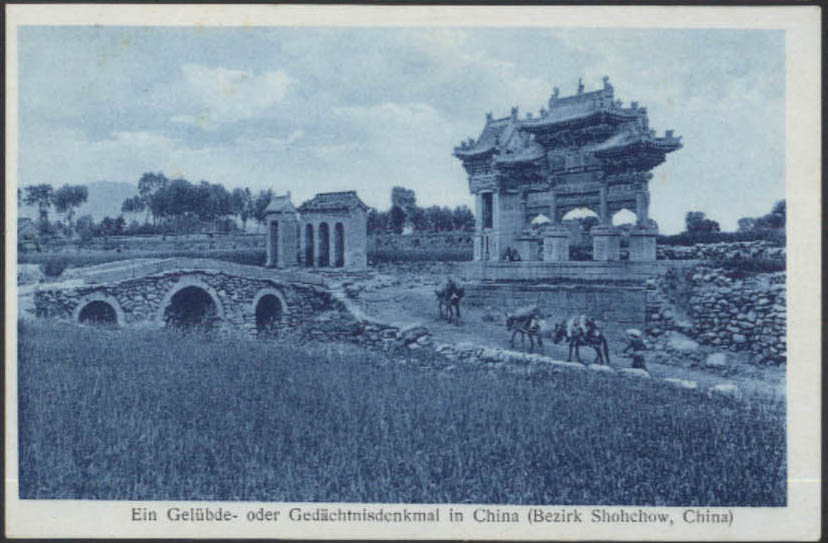
- The Zhu Clan Pailou in Yuanping

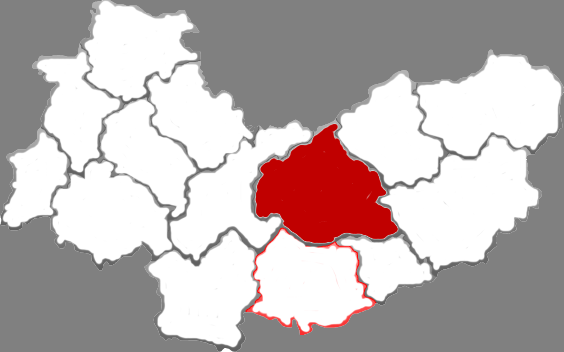
- Location in Xinzhou

- Location in Shanxi
- Coordinates: 38°43′52″N 112°42′40″E
- Country: People's Republic of China
- Province: Shanxi
- Prefecture-level city: Xinzhou

Area
  - County-level city: 2,571.0 km^{2} (992.7 sq mi)
  - Urban: 148.00 km^{2} (57.14 sq mi)
- Elevation: 825 m (2,707 ft)

Population (2017)
  - County-level city: 526,000
  - Density: 205/km^{2} (530/sq mi)
  - Urban: 184,200
- Time zone: UTC+8 (China Standard)
- Postal code: 034100
- Area code: 0350
- Website: yuanping.gov.cn

Yuanping
- Chinese: 原平
Transcriptions
Standard Mandarin
- Hanyu Pinyin: Yuánpíng

Yuanping is a county-level city under the administration of the prefecture-level city of Xinzhou, in north-central Shanxi Province, China.

== History ==
The territory of present-day Yuanping was held by Zhao during the Warring States Period of Chinese history. Under the Qin dynasty, it was part of Taiyuan Commandary. It became Yuanping County in 114 BC under Emperor Wu of the Han. It became Xinxing County in Jian'an 15 during the Eastern Han. Three years later, its name was restored as Yuanping County, but it was moved to Yanmen Commandery.

== Geography ==
Yuanping is located nearly due north of Taiyuan, the provincial capital.

=== Climate ===
Yuanping has a monsoon-influenced, continental semi-arid climate (Köppen BSk), with cold and very dry winters, and hot, humid summers. The monthly 24-hour average temperature ranges from −7.0 °C (19.4 °F) in January to 23.7 °C (74.7 °F) in July, and the annual mean is 9.55 °C (49.2 °F). Nearly half of the 412 millimetres (16.2 in) of precipitation occurs in July and August alone. Due to the high elevation and dry climate, the diurnal temperature variation easily exceeds 15 °C (27 °F) in winter and spring, with monthly percent possible sunshine ranging from 50% in July to 62% in four months, and the average annual total is 2,585 hours.

Climate data for Yuanping, elevation 828 m (2,717 ft), (1991–2020 normals, extremes 1951–present)
Month	Jan	Feb	Mar	Apr	May	Jun	Jul	Aug	Sep	Oct	Nov	Dec	Year
Record high °C (°F)	11.6 (52.9)	17.5 (63.5)	28.6 (83.5)	37.0 (98.6)	37.4 (99.3)	41.1 (106.0)	39.3 (102.7)	36.0 (96.8)	33.4 (92.1)	28.1 (82.6)	20.5 (68.9)	15.0 (59.0)	41.1 (106.0)
Mean daily maximum °C (°F)	0.4 (32.7)	4.9 (40.8)	11.9 (53.4)	19.8 (67.6)	25.7 (78.3)	29.0 (84.2)	29.7 (85.5)	28.0 (82.4)	23.5 (74.3)	17.1 (62.8)	8.4 (47.1)	1.6 (34.9)	16.7 (62.0)
Daily mean °C (°F)	−6.3 (20.7)	−1.9 (28.6)	4.8 (40.6)	12.6 (54.7)	18.8 (65.8)	22.5 (72.5)	23.9 (75.0)	22.2 (72.0)	17.0 (62.6)	10.2 (50.4)	2.0 (35.6)	−4.6 (23.7)	10.1 (50.2)
Mean daily minimum °C (°F)	−11.5 (11.3)	−7.3 (18.9)	−1.1 (30.0)	5.8 (42.4)	11.9 (53.4)	16.4 (61.5)	18.9 (66.0)	17.4 (63.3)	11.7 (53.1)	4.7 (40.5)	−2.9 (26.8)	−9.4 (15.1)	4.6 (40.2)
Record low °C (°F)	−25.2 (−13.4)	−21.5 (−6.7)	−15.5 (4.1)	−5.8 (21.6)	−1.1 (30.0)	7.3 (45.1)	10.9 (51.6)	7.4 (45.3)	−1.2 (29.8)	−9.1 (15.6)	−21.3 (−6.3)	−24.3 (−11.7)	−25.2 (−13.4)
Average precipitation mm (inches)	2.0 (0.08)	3.4 (0.13)	7.7 (0.30)	18.4 (0.72)	32.6 (1.28)	55.7 (2.19)	110.1 (4.33)	102.8 (4.05)	58.6 (2.31)	22.1 (0.87)	11.0 (0.43)	1.6 (0.06)	426 (16.75)
Average precipitation days (≥ 0.1 mm)	1.4	2.0	3.0	4.3	6.0	9.7	12.1	10.9	9.2	5.5	3.3	1.2	68.6
Average snowy days	1.9	3.0	2.9	0.7	0	0	0	0	0	0.2	2.4	2.1	13.2
Average relative humidity (%)	44	40	38	38	39	51	66	68	65	57	52	47	50
Mean monthly sunshine hours	150.7	161.9	201.0	227.0	254.3	217.1	205.2	198.6	185.5	188.3	154.9	146.8	2,291.3
Percentage possible sunshine	49	53	54	57	57	49	46	48	50	55	52	50	52
Source: China Meteorological Administration all-time January high

== Transportation ==
The city lies on the G55 Erenhot–Guangzhou Expressway. Yuanping West railway station lies on the Datong–Xi'an high-speed railway and the Jining–Datong–Yuanping high-speed railway. Yuanping station is at the junction of the Beijing–Yuanping Railway and the Datong–Puzhou Railway.
