= Lancun Township, Shanxi =

Lancun Township 兰村乡
- Township
- Location in Shanxi
- Coordinates: 38°21′41″N 112°42′36″E
- Country: People's Republic of China
- Province: Shanxi
- Prefecture-level city: Xinzhou
- District: Xinfu District
- Time zone: UTC+8 (China Standard)

Lancun Township (simplified Chinese: 兰村乡; traditional Chinese: 蘭村鄉; pinyin: láncūn Xiāng) is a township under the administration of Xinfu District, Xinzhou, Shanxi, China. As of 2020, it administers the following 20 villages:

- Lancun Village
- Mopanshan Village (磨盘山村)
- Yancun Village (晏村村)
- Dawang Village (大王村)
- Xiaowang Village (小王村)
- Nanhuyan Village (南呼延村)
- Xiqu Village (西曲村)
- Beichang Village (北场村)
- Xiashe Village (下社村)
- Fanye Village (范野村)
- Zhangye Village (张野村)
- Yancun Village (烟村村)
- Hexitou Village (河习头村)
- Wangyao Village (王要村)
- Yidi Village (依堤村)
- Qiantanggou Village (钱塘沟村)
- Xiwang Village (西王村)
- Xiaojiayu Village (肖家峪村)
- Nanbao Village (南堡村)
- Houyeyu Village (后野峪村)

== See also ==
- List of township-level divisions of Shanxi
