= Dingxiang County =

Dingxiang County 定襄县 Tingsiang
- County
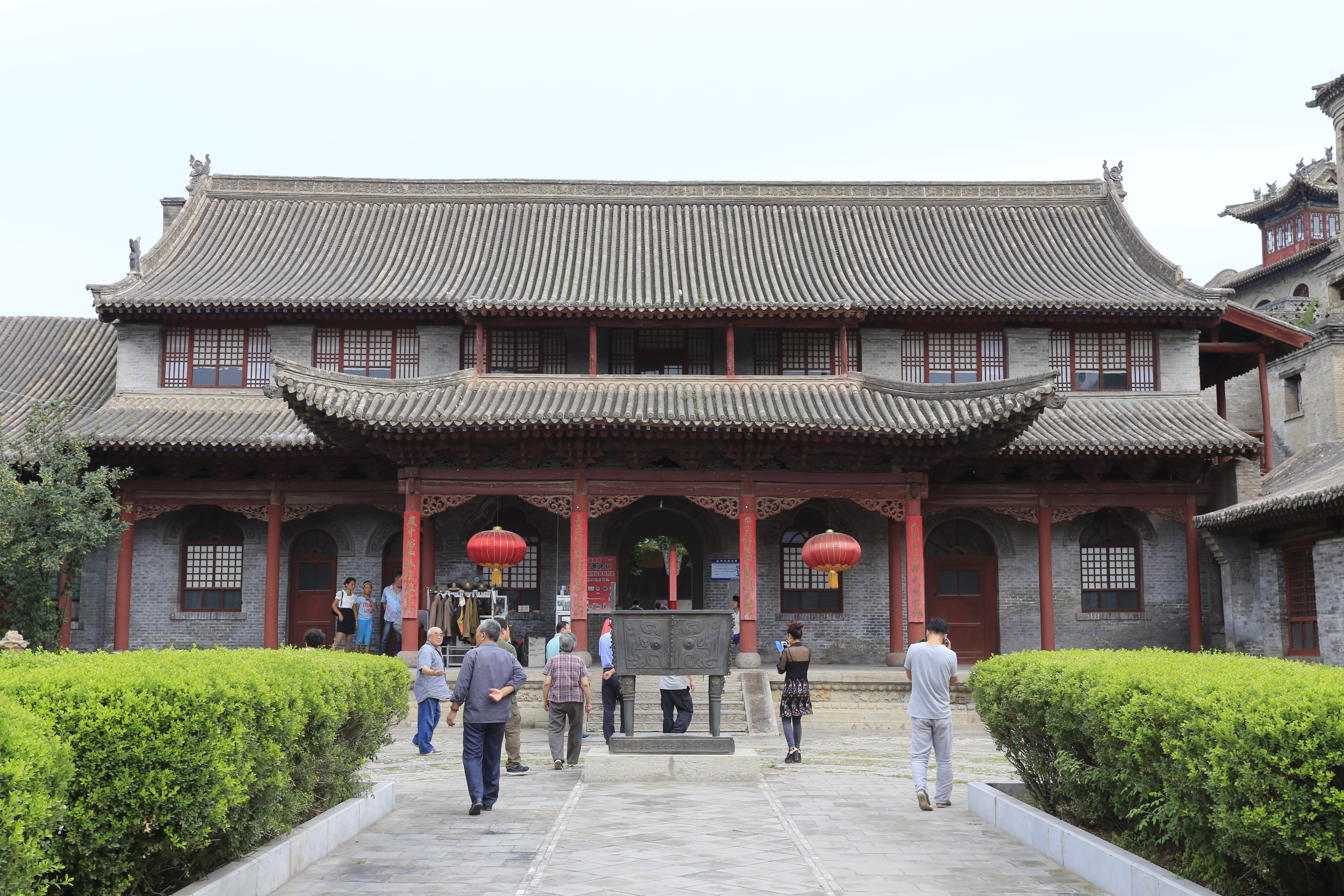
- Former residence of Yan Xishan

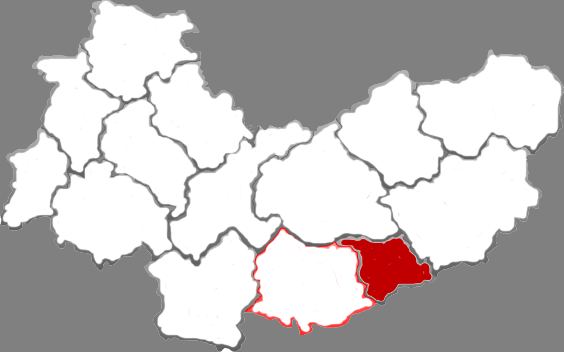
- Location in Xinzhou

- Location in Shanxi
- Coordinates: 38°31′28″N 113°00′06″E
- Country: People's Republic of China
- Province: Shanxi
- Prefecture-level city: Xinzhou

Population (2020)
  - Total: 193,997
- Time zone: UTC+8 (China Standard)
- Postal code: 035400

Dingxiang (Chinese: 定襄; pinyin: Dìngxiāng) is a county in the north central part of Shanxi province, China. It is under the administration of Xinzhou city.

== Climate ==
Climate data for Dingxiang, elevation 759 m (2,490 ft), (1991–2020 normals, extremes 1972–present)
Month	Jan	Feb	Mar	Apr	May	Jun	Jul	Aug	Sep	Oct	Nov	Dec	Year
Record high °C (°F)	13.8 (56.8)	18.5 (65.3)	29.2 (84.6)	38.5 (101.3)	38.5 (101.3)	41.7 (107.1)	39.5 (103.1)	37.3 (99.1)	35.5 (95.9)	30.3 (86.5)	26.8 (80.2)	19.8 (67.6)	41.7 (107.1)
Mean daily maximum °C (°F)	0.9 (33.6)	5.5 (41.9)	12.6 (54.7)	20.7 (69.3)	26.6 (79.9)	29.8 (85.6)	30.2 (86.4)	28.4 (83.1)	24.2 (75.6)	17.9 (64.2)	8.9 (48.0)	2.0 (35.6)	17.3 (63.2)
Daily mean °C (°F)	−8.1 (17.4)	−3.3 (26.1)	4.3 (39.7)	12.3 (54.1)	18.5 (65.3)	22.0 (71.6)	23.2 (73.8)	21.4 (70.5)	15.9 (60.6)	9.1 (48.4)	0.7 (33.3)	−6.3 (20.7)	9.1 (48.5)
Mean daily minimum °C (°F)	−14.8 (5.4)	−10.0 (14.0)	−2.5 (27.5)	4.3 (39.7)	10.3 (50.5)	14.8 (58.6)	17.6 (63.7)	16.1 (61.0)	9.9 (49.8)	2.6 (36.7)	−5.0 (23.0)	−12.3 (9.9)	2.6 (36.7)
Record low °C (°F)	−27.2 (−17.0)	−24.8 (−12.6)	−16.5 (2.3)	−7.0 (19.4)	−1.5 (29.3)	6.1 (43.0)	8.5 (47.3)	5.6 (42.1)	−2.6 (27.3)	−9.9 (14.2)	−23.8 (−10.8)	−29.9 (−21.8)	−29.9 (−21.8)
Average precipitation mm (inches)	2.3 (0.09)	3.7 (0.15)	6.9 (0.27)	19.0 (0.75)	33.1 (1.30)	58.7 (2.31)	95.9 (3.78)	95.5 (3.76)	53.7 (2.11)	26.3 (1.04)	11.2 (0.44)	2.2 (0.09)	408.5 (16.09)
Average precipitation days (≥ 0.1 mm)	1.6	2.5	3.1	5.1	6.8	10.4	12.8	11.7	8.9	5.7	3.4	1.4	73.4
Average snowy days	2.0	2.7	2.0	0.7	0	0	0	0	0	0.1	1.9	1.8	11.2
Average relative humidity (%)	53	49	48	45	46	59	75	79	77	67	63	56	60
Mean monthly sunshine hours	155.9	168.4	215.5	237.9	258.8	230.3	215.1	209.6	197.2	200.4	166.9	154.7	2,410.7
Percentage possible sunshine	51	55	58	60	58	52	48	50	54	59	56	53	55
Source: China Meteorological Administration

== See also ==
- Daiyang village
