= Hanjialing–Yuanping railway =

Railway line in Shanxi, China

Hanjialing–Yuanping railway 韩原铁路

Overview
- Other name: Hanyuan railway
- Status: In operation
- Locale: Shanxi
- Termini: Hanjialing; Yuanping

Service
- Type: Class I railway
- System: China Railway
- Operator: China Railway Taiyuan Group

History
- Opened: 25 February 2014

Technical
- Line length: 153 km (95 mi)
- Character: Passenger and freight
- Track gauge: 1,435 mm (4 ft 8 1/2 in) standard gauge
- Minimum radius: 3,500 m (11,500 ft), 2,800 m (9,200 ft) in difficult areas
- Operating speed: 160 km/h (99 mph) with capacity to increase to 200 km/h (120 mph)
- Maximum incline: 0.6%

The Hanjialing–Yuanping railway, also known as the Hanyuan Railway (Chinese: 韩原铁路; pinyin: Hán yuán tiělù), also known as the North Tongpu four-track railway, is a north–south railway located in Shanxi Province. It is the northern part of the Datong–Puzhou railway (Tongpu railway) running from Yuanping in the south to the Datong–Qinhuangdao railway at Hanjialing. The line is a national class I double-track, electrified railway with a total length of 153 kilometres and a design speed of 160 kilometres per hour, built entirely with heavy-duty track. The whole line opened for freight traffic on 25 February 2014 and passenger services commenced on March 29 of the same year. Construction of two extra tracks was completed on 1 May 2019.

In February 2016, Shanxi Province decided to build the Datong–Yuanping HSR. On June 15, the "Environmental Impact Report on the New Daton–Yuanping Railway Passenger Dedicated Line" was published in its entirety. In July, the Shanxi Provincial Development and Reform Commission approved the "Feasibility Study Report on the New Datong–Yuanping Railway Passenger Dedicated Line". On 9 July, the Environmental Protection Department of Shanxi Province approved the "Environmental Impact Report of the New Datong–Yuanping Railway Passenger Dedicated Line". On 12 August, the construction of third and fourth tracks for passenger traffic from Datong to Yuanping commenced next to the North Tongpu Railway, then under construction. However, only about 2.2 kilometres of the subgrade and culvert construction at Shuozhou East was completed, and then construction was suspended.

Subsequently, a new route extending from Ulanqab railway station (in Jining) to Datong and Yuanping was studied. The announcement of the approval of the construction of the new Jining–Datong–Yuanping HSR was made on 18 May 2020. On 30 June, the ground breaking ceremony for the new HSR was held in Shuozhou City. On 31 December 2024, the new high-speed line was opened for operation.
