= Taiyuan East railway station =

Railway station in Taiyuan, Shanxi, China

Taiyuan East 太原东
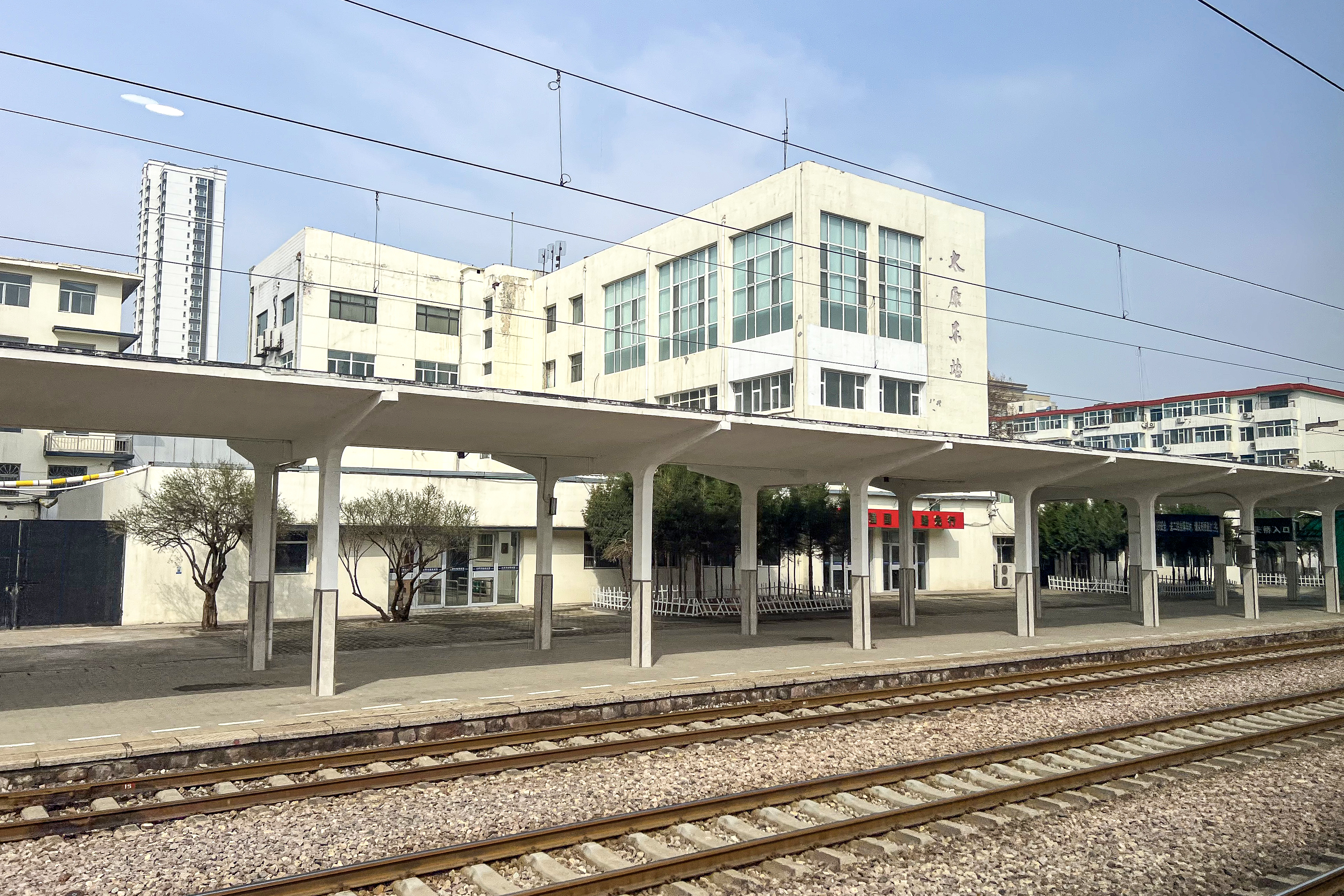

General information
- Other names: Taiyuandong
- Location: Xinghualing District, Taiyuan, Shanxi Province; China
- Coordinates: 37.8844°N 112.5867°E
- Operated by: Taiyuan Railway Bureau
- Line(s): Shijiazhuang–Taiyuan High-Speed Railway
- Platforms: 3

Other information
- Station code: TMIS code: 26456; Telegraph code:TDV; Pinyin code: TYD
- Classification: Class 1 station

History
- Opened: 1933; 92 years ago
- Previous names: Taiyuan North (太原北)

Taiyuan East railway station is a railway station on the Tongpu Railway, Shitai Railway and Shitai Passenger Railway, in the People's Republic of China.

In 1959, the station changed to its current name from Taiyuan North railway station.
