= China Railway Taiyuan Group =

China Railway Taiyuan Group Co., Ltd.
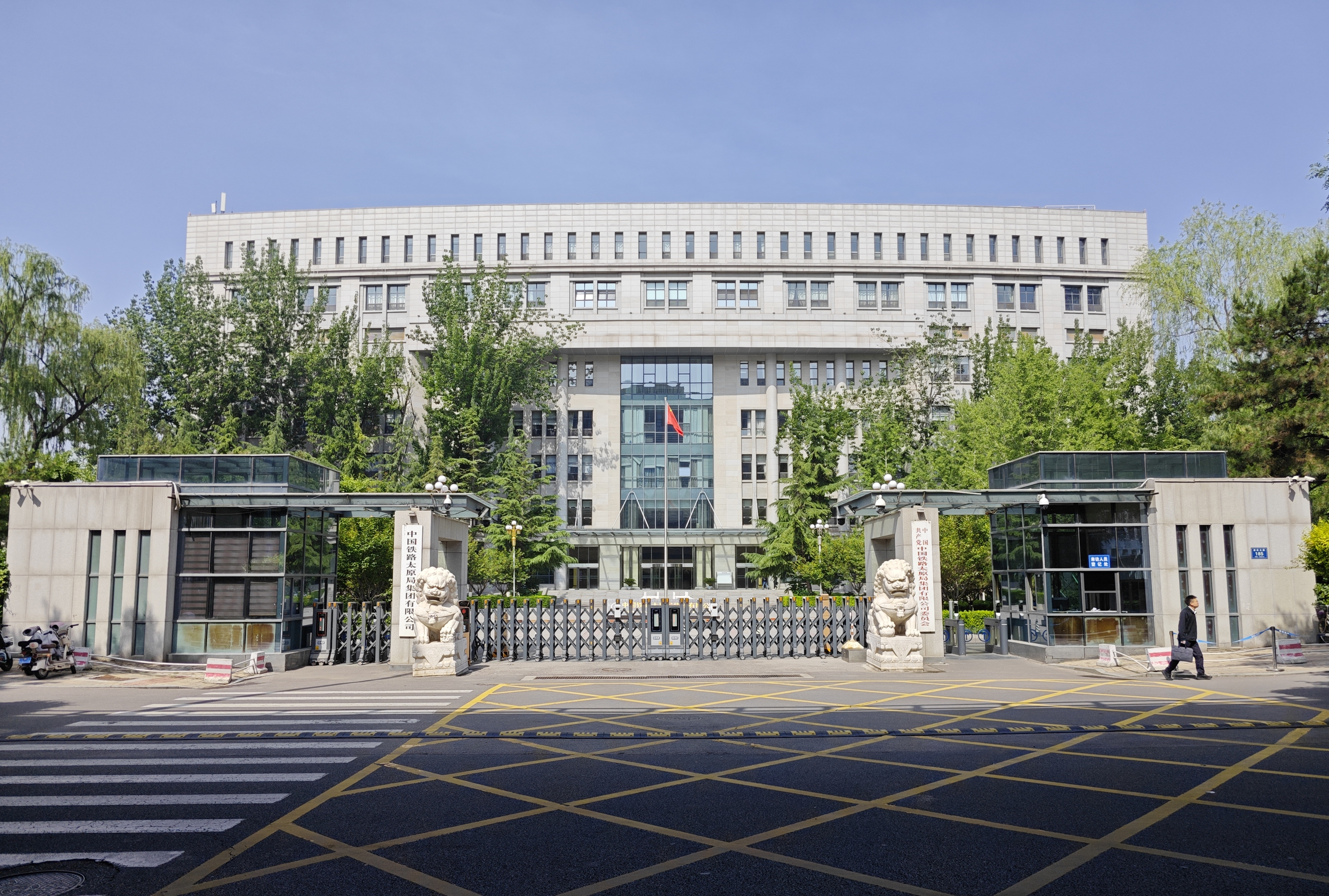
- Headquarter of CR Taiyuan
- Type: state-owned enterprise
- Industry: Railway operations
- Predecessor: Taiyuan Railway Administration
- Founded: 19 November 2017
- Headquarters: 185 Jianshe N Road, Xinghualing, Taiyuan, Shanxi, China
- Area served: Shanxi
- Owner: Government of China
- Parent: China Railway
- Website: Official Website

China Railway Taiyuan Group
- Simplified Chinese: 中国铁路太原局集团
- Traditional Chinese: 中國鐵路太原局集團
Transcriptions
Standard Mandarin
- Hanyu Pinyin: Zhōngguó Tiělù Tàiyuán Jú Jítuán
- Wade–Giles: Chung-kuo Tʻieh-lu Tʻai-yüan Chü Chi-tʻuan

Taiyuan Railway Administration
- Simplified Chinese: 太原铁路局
- Traditional Chinese: 太原鐵路局
Transcriptions
Standard Mandarin
- Hanyu Pinyin: Tàiyuán Tiělù Jú
- Wade–Giles: Tʻai-yüan Tʻieh-lu Chü

CR Taiyuan
- Simplified Chinese: 太铁
- Traditional Chinese: 太鐵
Transcriptions
Standard Mandarin
- Hanyu Pinyin: Tàitiě
- Wade–Giles: Tʻai-tʻieh

China Railway Taiyuan Group, officially abbreviated as CR Taiyuan or CR-Taiyuan, formerly, Taiyuan Railway Administration is a group subsidiary under the umbrella of the China Railway Group (formerly the Ministry of Railway). The railway administration was reorganized as a limited liability company in November 2017.

It is responsible for the railway network within Shanxi and the entire Daqin railway under a subsidiary Daqin Railway Company.

== Hub stations ==
- Taiyuan
  - Taiyuan, Taiyuan South, Taiyuan East
- Datong
  - Datong
- Jinzhong
  - Yuci
- Houma
  - Houma
