= Xinghualing, Taiyuan =

Coordinates: 37°54′37″N 112°33′35″E

Xinghualing 杏花岭区
- District
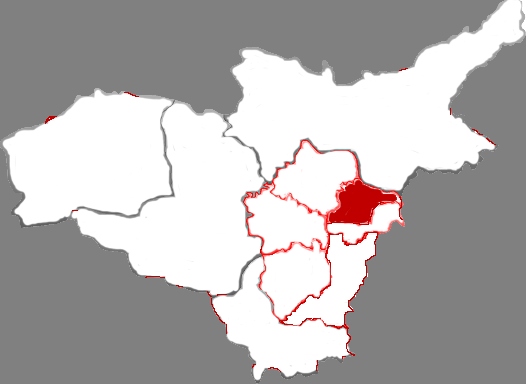
- Location in Taiyuan

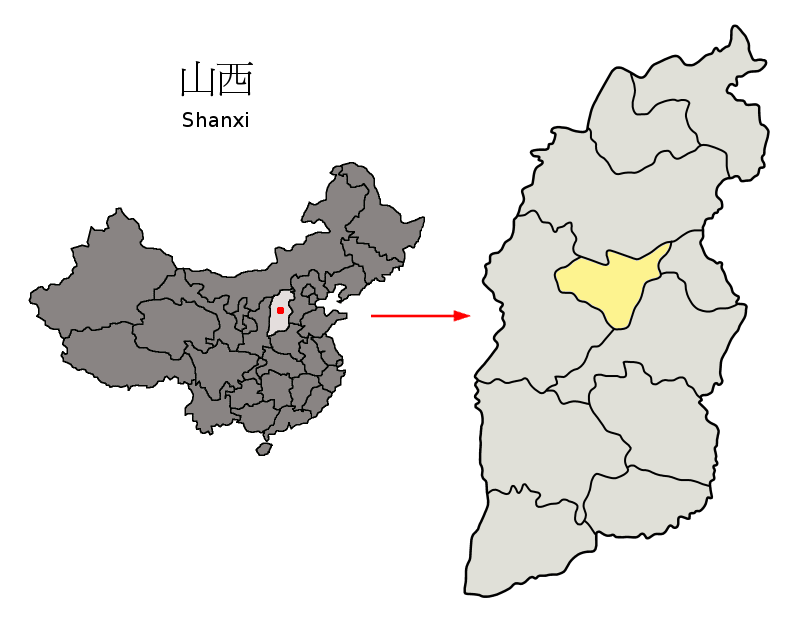
- Taiyuan in Shanxi
- Country: People's Republic of China
- Province: Shanxi
- Prefecture-level city: Taiyuan

Area
  - Total: 147 km^{2} (57 sq mi)

Population (2020)
  - Total: 779,479
  - Density: 5,300/km^{2} (13,700/sq mi)
- Time zone: UTC+8 (China Standard)
- Website: www.sxtyxhl.gov.cn/xinghl/index.jhtml

Xinghualing District (simplified Chinese: 杏花岭区; traditional Chinese: 杏花嶺區; pinyin: Xìnghuālǐng Qū) is one of six districts of the prefecture-level city of Taiyuan, the capital of Shanxi Province, North China. It is located in the urban core of Taiyuan.
