= Shanxi Museum =

Coordinates: 37.8650°N 112.5264°E

- 山西博物院
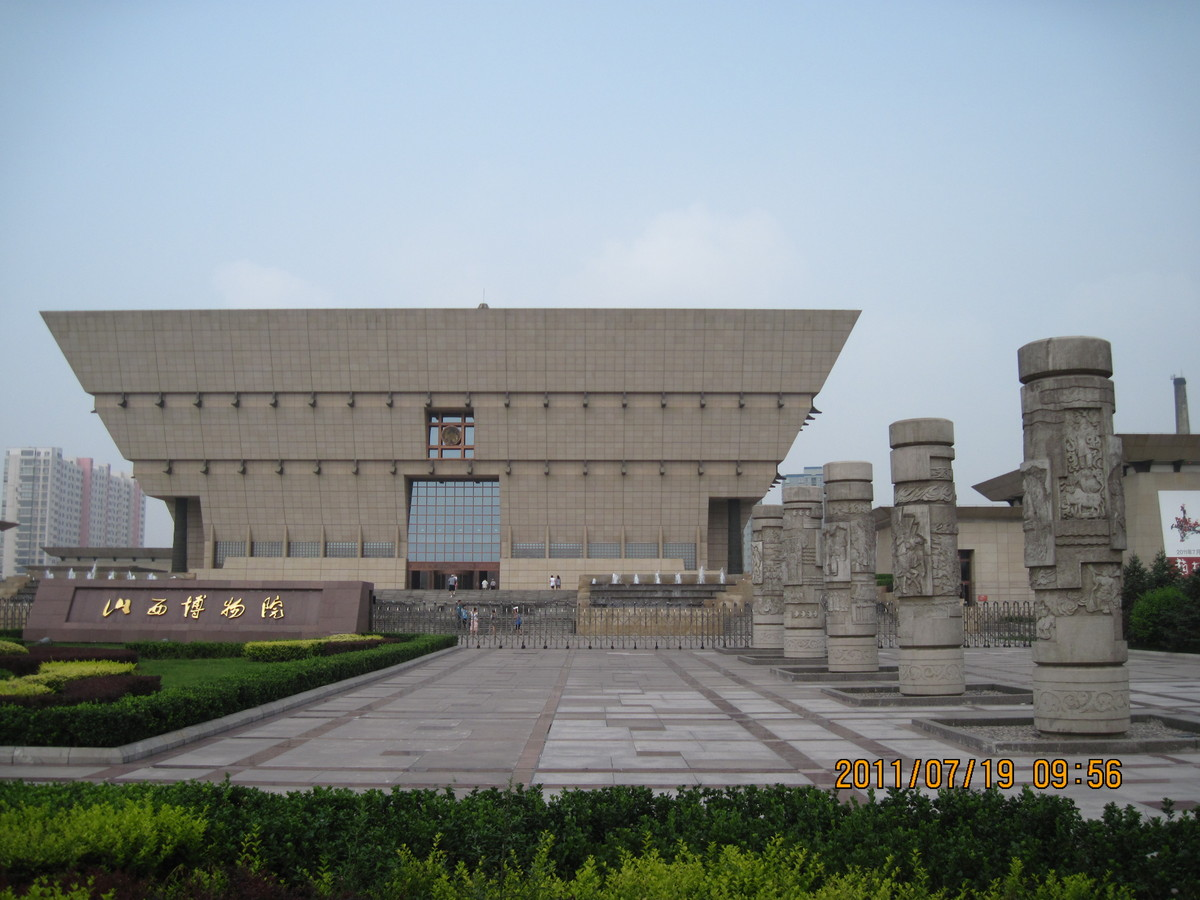
- Former name: Shanxi Provincial Museum; Education Library and Museum of Shanxi
- Established: September 26, 2005
- Location: Taiyuan, Shanxi, China
- Type: Provincial museum
- Website: www.shanximuseum.com.cn (in Chinese)

The Shanxi Museum (Chinese: 山西博物院; pinyin: Shanxi Bówùyuàn) is the largest museum and cultural building in the province of Shanxi, China. The museum, located in Shanxi's provincial capital Taiyuan, is home to about 400,000 cultural relics and 110,000 old books. Since March 2008, admission is free with a valid ID.

The museum started off as the Education Library and Museum of Shanxi (Chinese: 山西教育图书博物馆; pinyin: Shanxi jiaoyu tushu bowuguan), which opened on October 9, 1919, as one of the earliest museums in China. Shortly after the Second Sino-Japanese War the institution's collections were heavily damaged and partially moved to Japan.

Amongst its important artefacts are those related to Sima Jinlong (d. CE 484), including a large number of tomb figurines from his tomb including those made of lead-glazed ceramics. The museum also has a tomb plaque from Sima Jinlong's tomb. Other artefacts related to Sima Jinlong are in the Datong Museum.

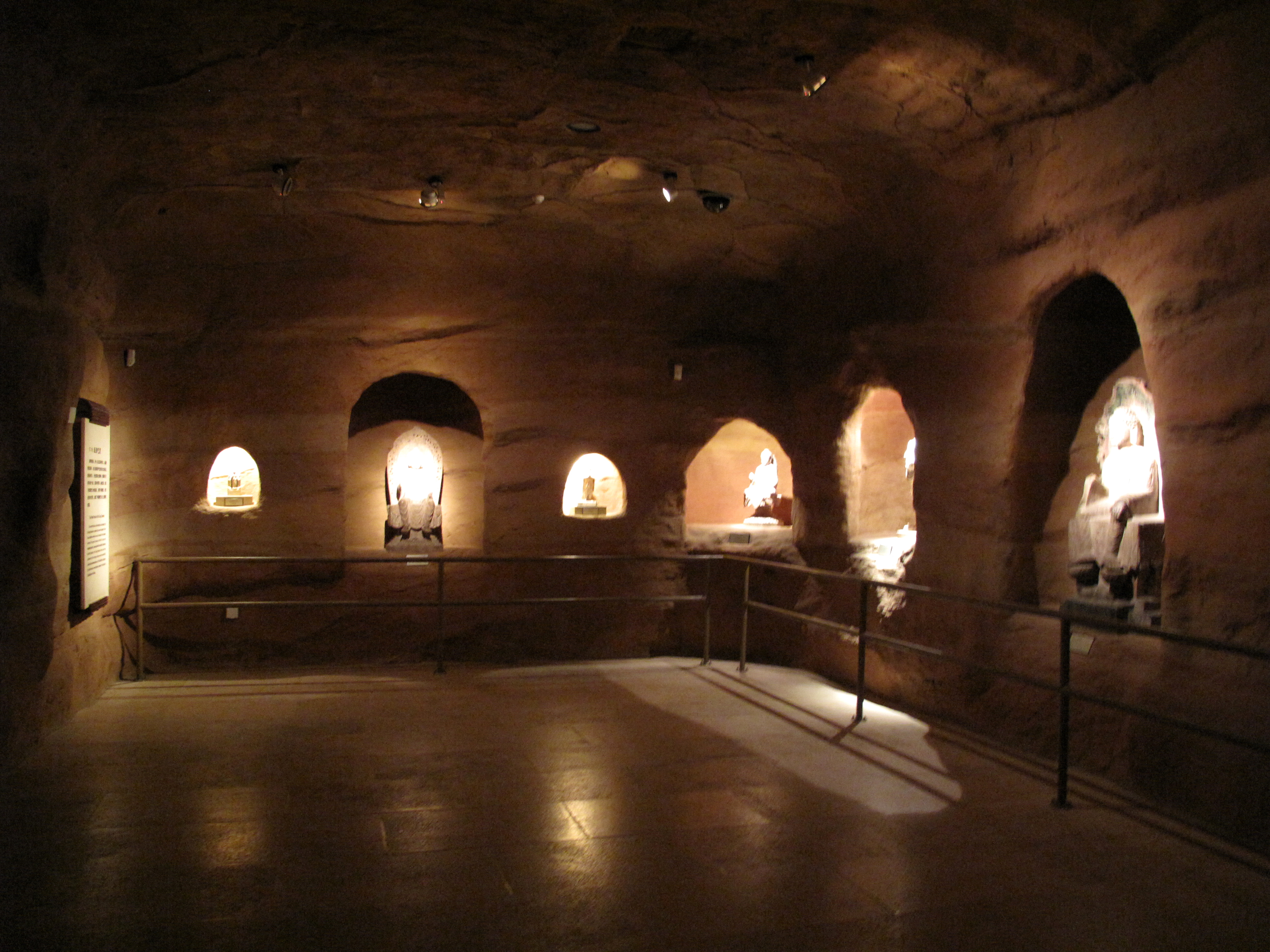
A room of the sculptures display in Shanxi Museum

In September 1953, the museum became the Shanxi Provincial Museum (Chinese: 山西省博物馆,; pinyin: Shānxīshĕng Bowuguan) after merging with the Relics Hall of Taiyuan City. After the completion of the new building in 2005 it was officially renamed the Shanxi Museum.

== Gallery ==
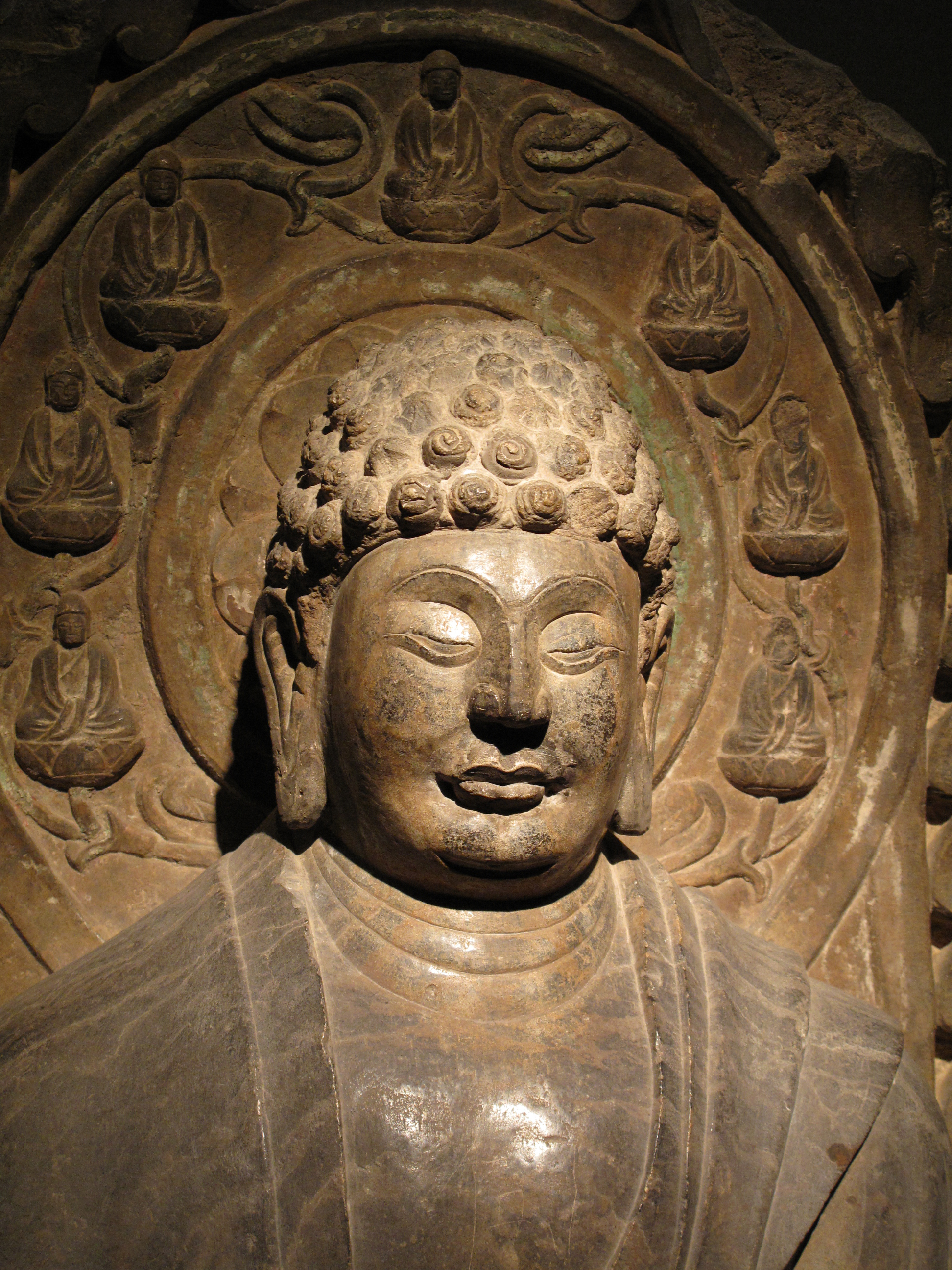

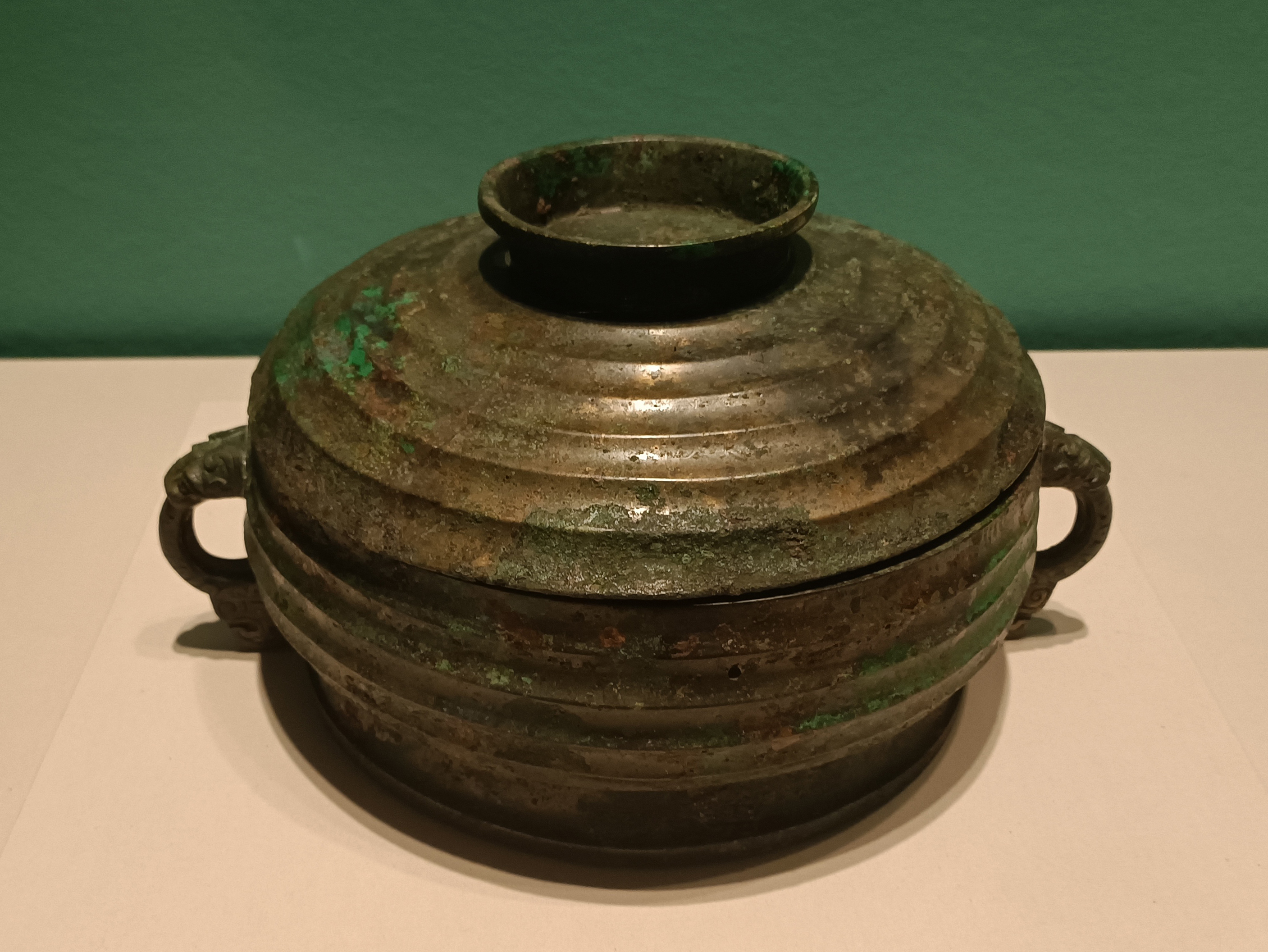

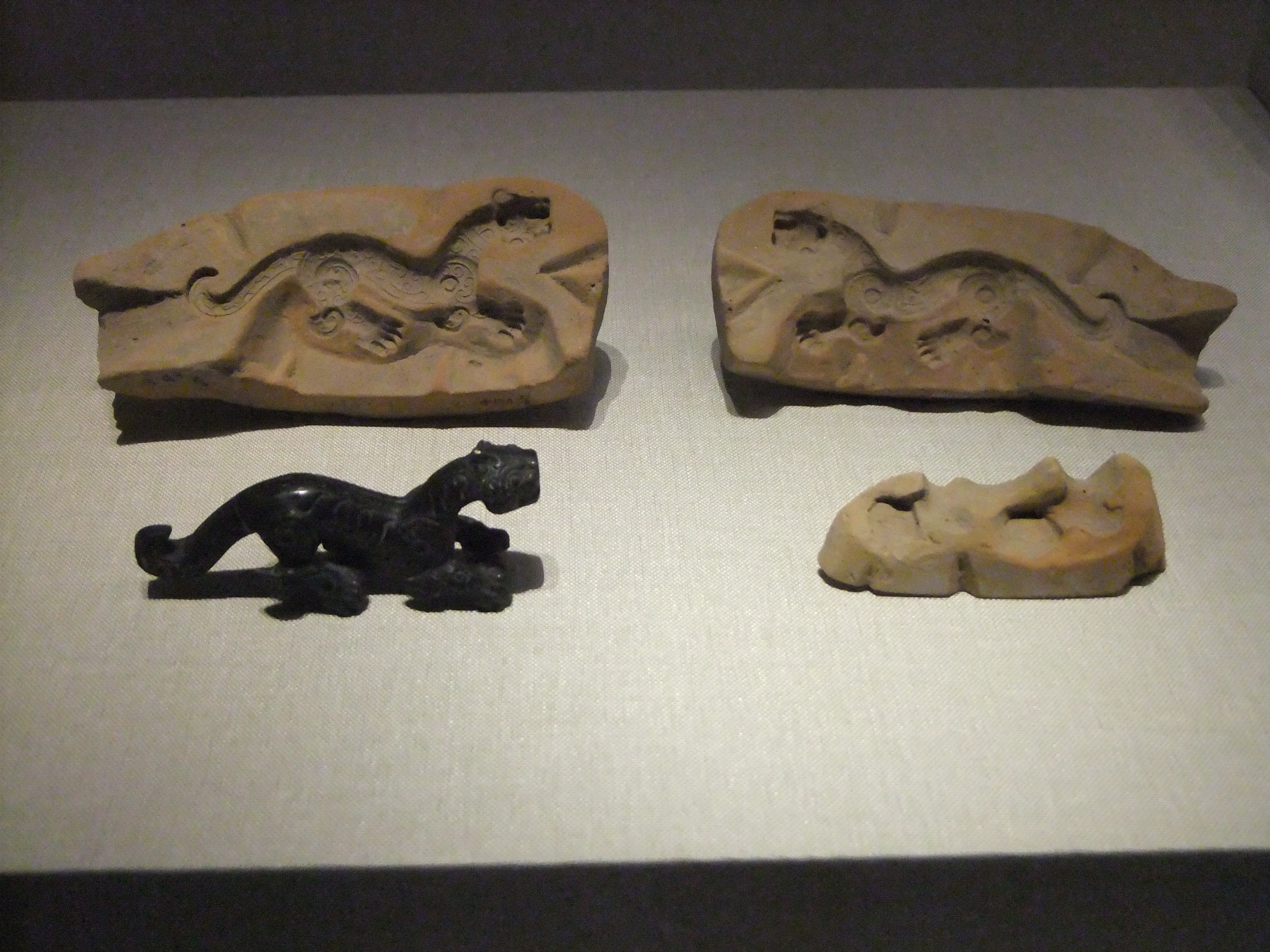

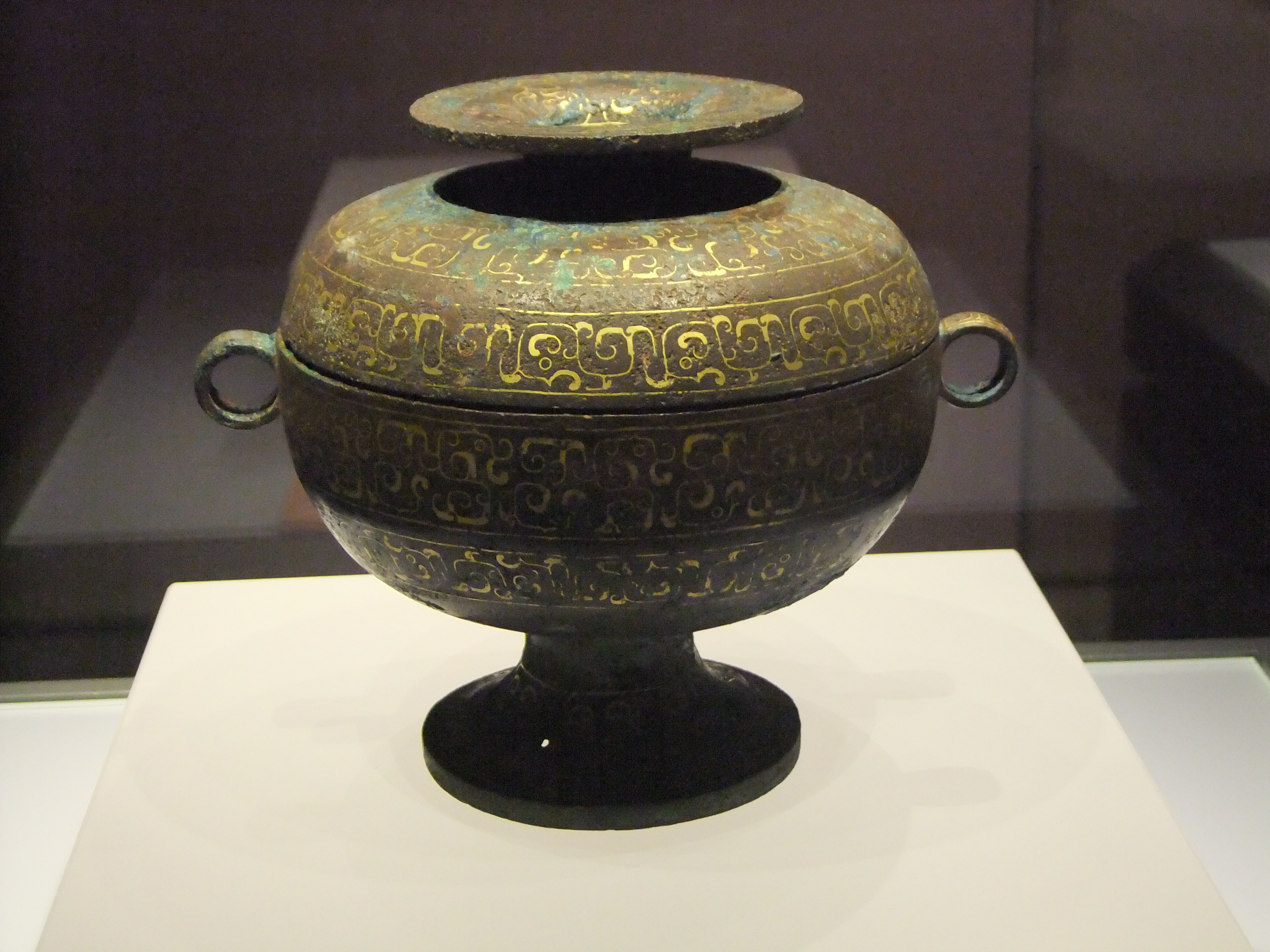

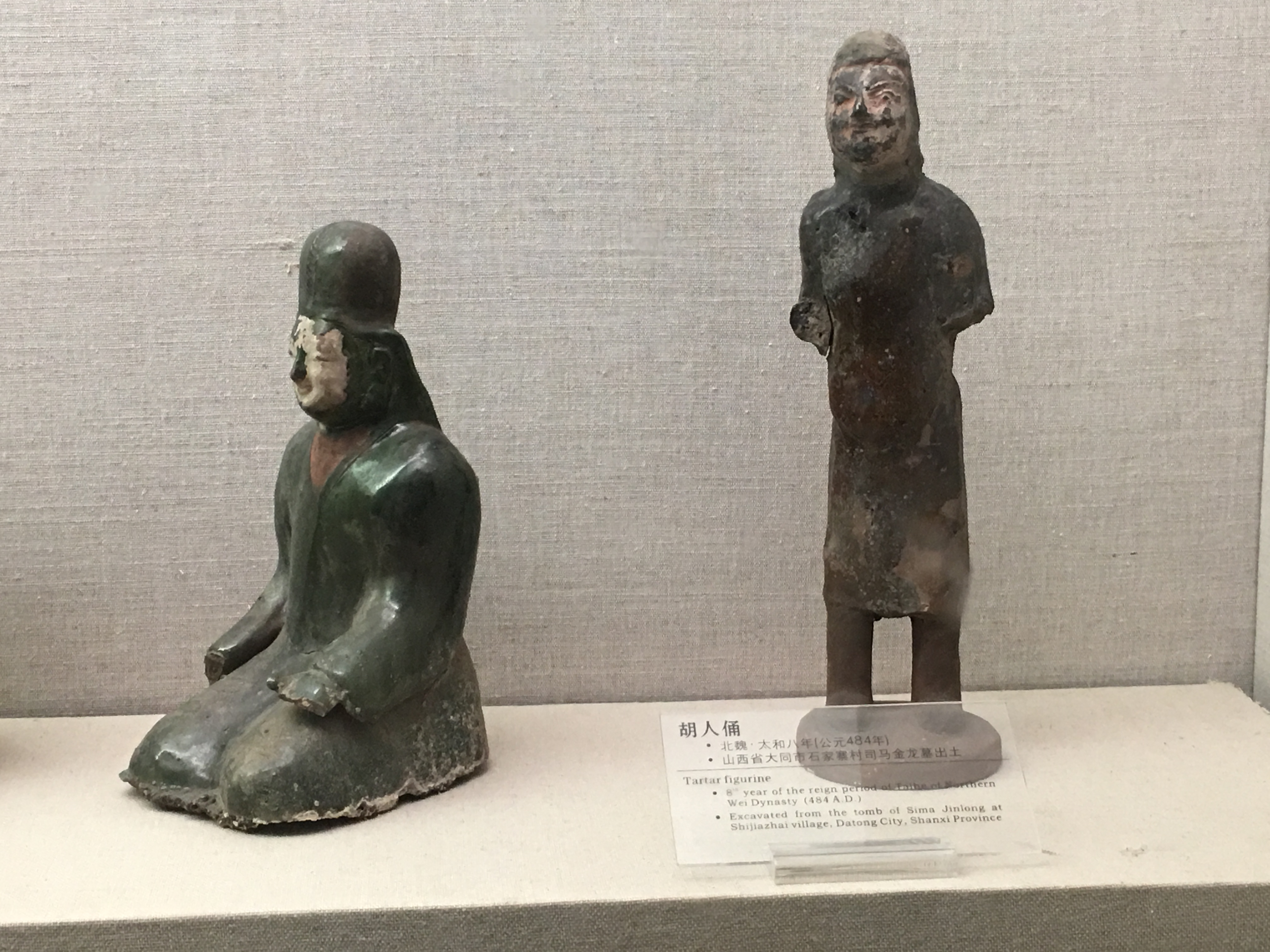

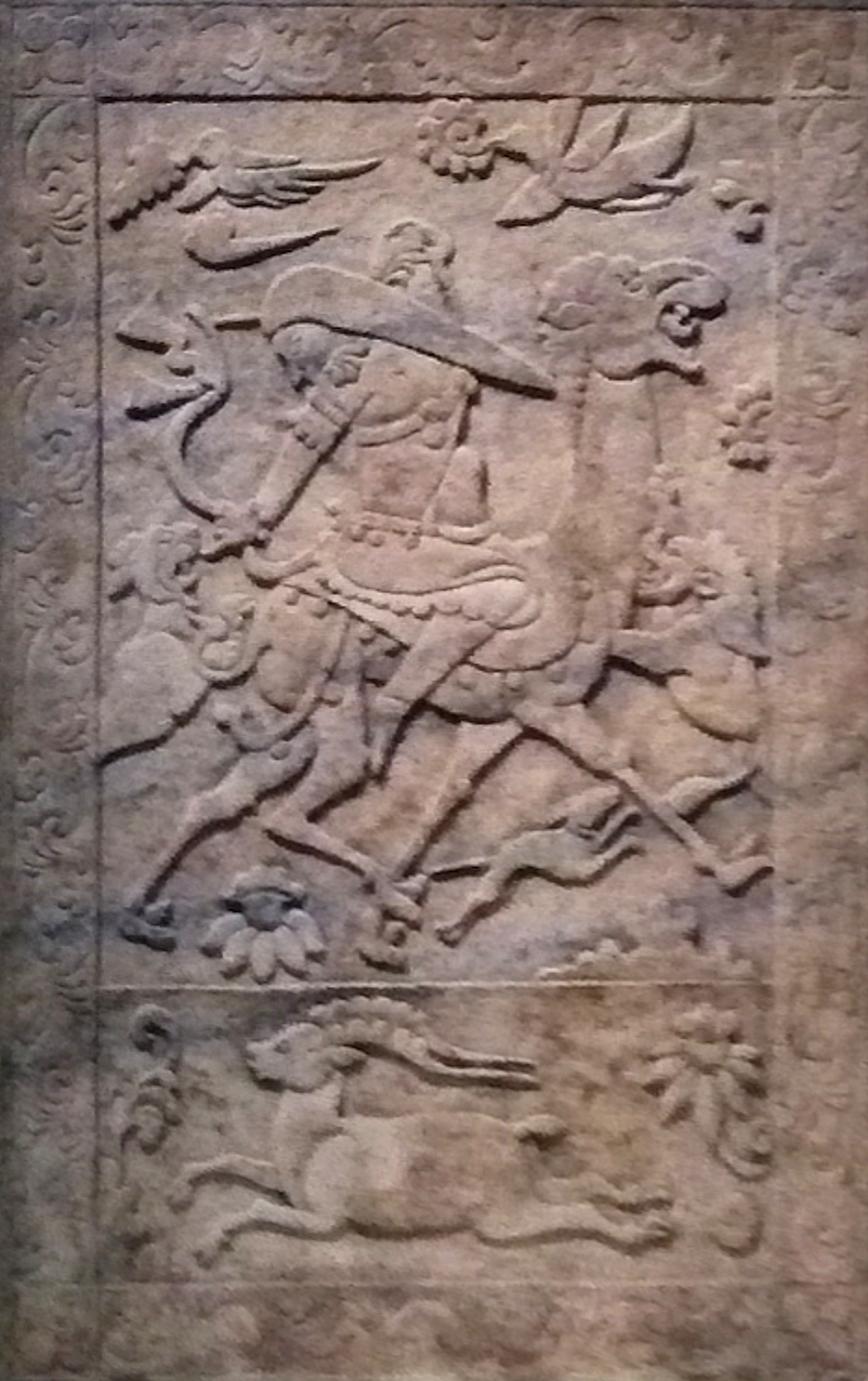

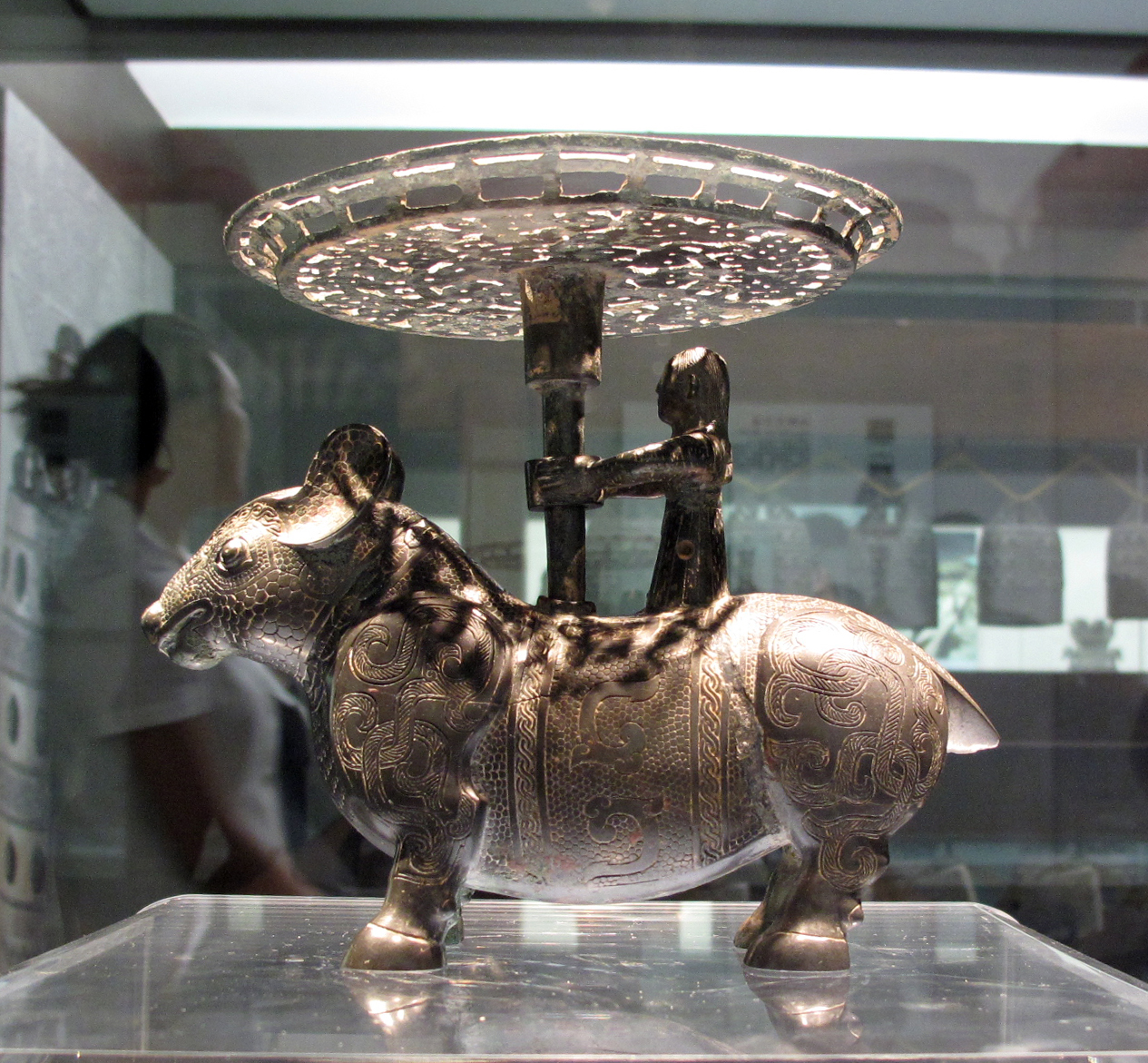

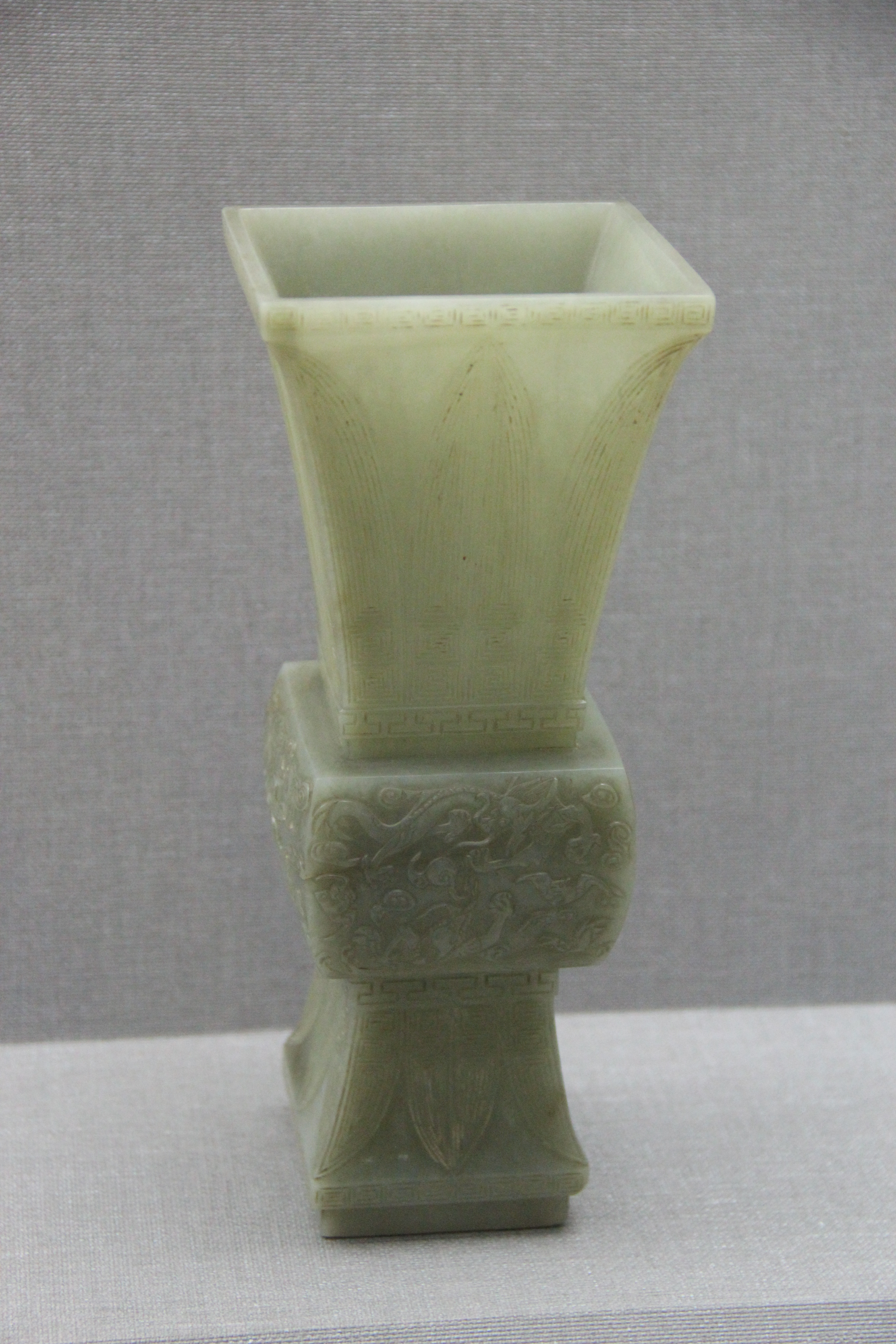
