= Xinfu District, Xinzhou =

Coordinates: 38°24′19″N 112°44′35″E

Xinfu 忻府区
- District
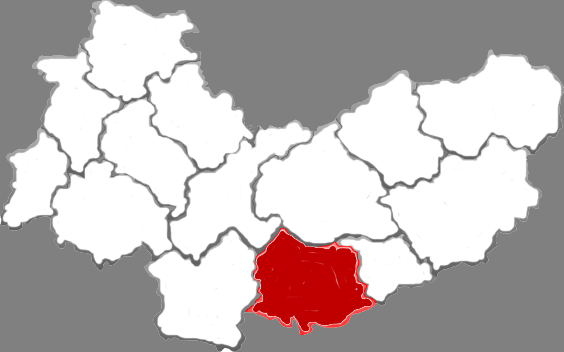
- Location in Xinzhou

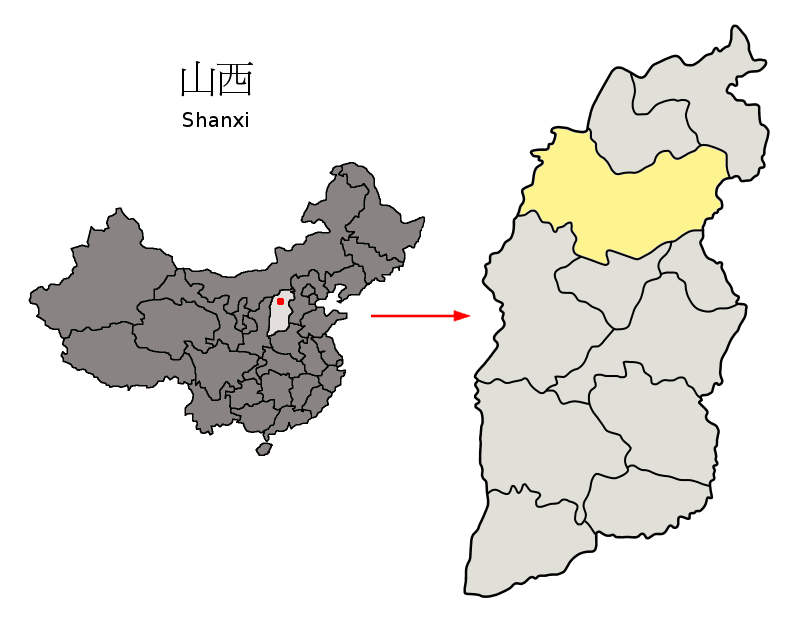
- Xinzhou in Shanxi
- Country: People's Republic of China
- Province: Shanxi
- Prefecture-level city: Xinzhou

Population (2020)
  - Total: 577,089
- Time zone: UTC+8 (China Standard)

Xinfu (Chinese: 忻府; pinyin: Xīnfǔ), formerly Xin County (忻县) and then the county-level Xinzhou city (忻州市), is the only district and the seat of the city of Xinzhou, Shanxi province, China.

== Transportation ==
Xinzhou West railway station is located here.
