= Xinzhou =

Xinzhou 忻州市
- Prefecture-level city
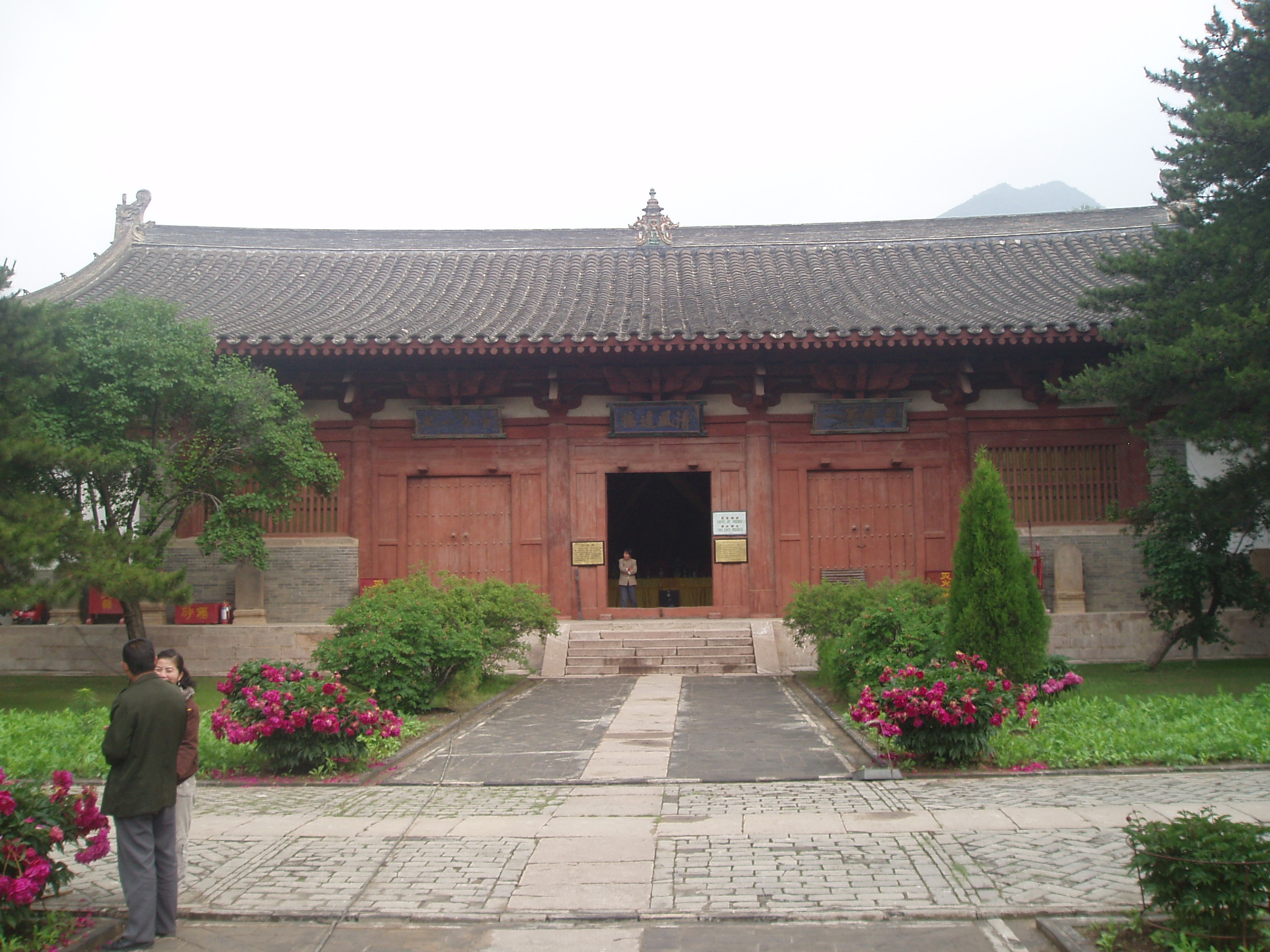
- Foguang Temple in Wutai County

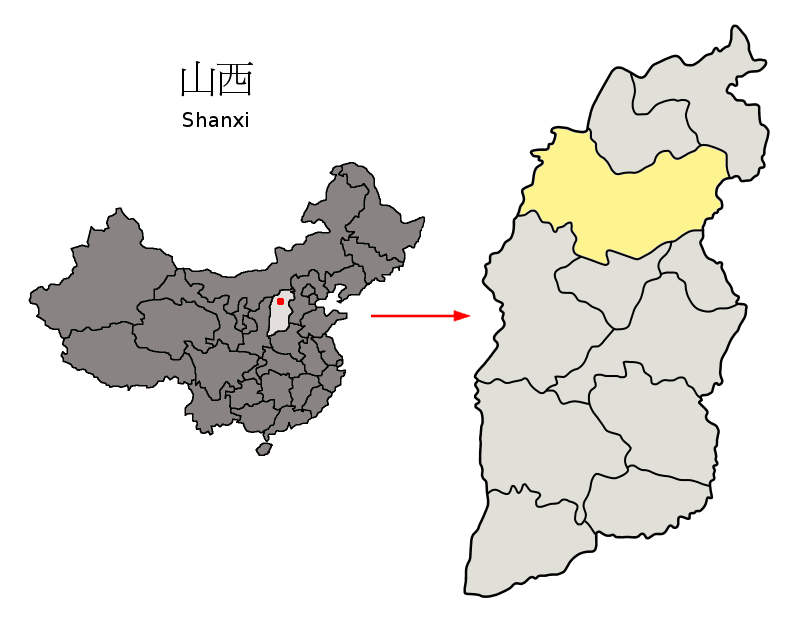
- Location of Xinzhou City jurisdiction in Shanxi

- Location of the city centre in Shanxi
- Coordinates (Xinzhou Municipal Government): 38°24′58″N 112°44′02″E
- Country: People's Republic of China
- Province: Shanxi
- County-level divisions: 14
- City seat: Xinfu

Government
  - Type: Prefecture-level city
  - CPC Xinzhou Secretary: Li Junming (李俊明)
  - Mayor: Zheng Liansheng (郑连生)

Area
  - Prefecture-level city: 25,180 km^{2} (9,720 sq mi)
  - Urban: 183.00 km^{2} (70.66 sq mi)
  - Districts: 1,982.0 km^{2} (765.3 sq mi)

Population (2010)
  - Prefecture-level city: 3,067,501
  - Density: 121.8/km^{2} (315.5/sq mi)
  - Urban: 302,500
  - Urban density: 1,653/km^{2} (4,281/sq mi)
  - Districts: 578,000

GDP
  - Prefecture-level city: CN¥ 103.5 billion US$ 16.3 billion
  - Per capita: CN¥ 33,726; US$ 5,396
- Time zone: UTC+08:00 (China Standard)
- Postal code: 034000
- Area code: 0350
- ISO 3166 code: CN-SX-09
- Licence plates: 晋H
- Administrative division code: 140900
- Website: www.sxxz.gov.cn

Xinzhou
- Chinese: 忻州
Transcriptions
Standard Mandarin
- Hanyu Pinyin: Xīnzhōu
- Wade–Giles: Hsin-chou

Xinzhou, ancient name Xiurong (秀荣), is a prefecture-level city occupying the north-central section of Shanxi Province in the People's Republic of China, bordering Hebei to the east, Shaanxi to the west, and Inner Mongolia to the northwest. As of 2022, the city has a permanent population of 2,655,563.

== Administrative divisions ==
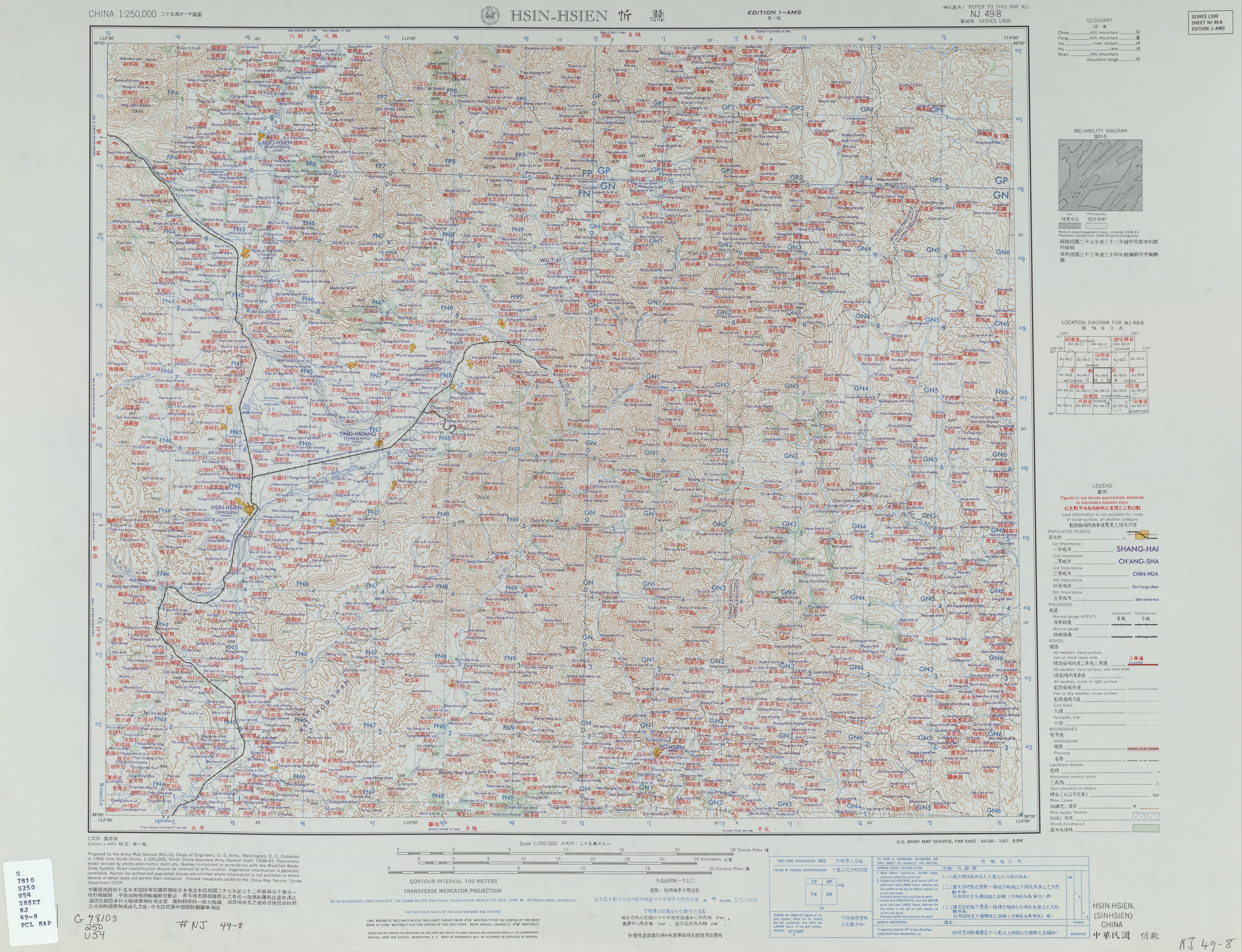
Map including Xin County (labeled as 忻縣 HSIN-HSIEN (SINHSIEN) (walled)) (AMS, 1956)

As of 2024, there are 14 county-level administrative divisions under jurisdiction of Xinzhou, including 1 district, 1 county-level city, and 12 counties. The details of those county-level administrative divisions are as follows:

Map
#	Name	Hanzi	Hanyu Pinyin	Population (2003 est.)	Area (km^{2})	Density (/km^{2})
1	Xinfu District	忻府区	Xīnfǔ Qū	510,000	1,954	261
2	Yuanping City	原平市	Yuánpíng Shì	470,000	2,571	183
3	Dingxiang County	定襄县	Dìngxiāng Xiàn	210,000	864	243
4	Wutai County	五台县	Wǔtái Xiàn	310,000	2,968	104
5	Dai County	代县	Dài Xiàn	200,000	1,720	116
6	Fanshi County	繁峙县	Fánshì Xiàn	240,000	2,369	101
7	Ningwu County	宁武县	Níngwǔ Xiàn	160,000	1,966	81
8	Jingle County	静乐县	Jìnglè Xiàn	160,000	2,063	78
9	Shenchi County	神池县	Shénchí Xiàn	100,000	1,456	69
10	Wuzhai County	五寨县	Wǔzhài Xiàn	100,000	1,379	73
11	Kelan County	岢岚县	Kělán Xiàn	80,000	1,980	40
12	Hequ County	河曲县	Héqǔ Xiàn	140,000	1,327	106
13	Baode County	保德县	Bǎodé Xiàn	150,000	981	153
14	Pianguan County	偏关县	Piānguān Xiàn	110,000	1,682	65

== Climate ==
Xinzhou has a continental, monsoon-influenced semi-arid climate (Köppen BSk), with cold, very dry, and somewhat long winters, and warm, somewhat humid summers. The monthly 24-hour average temperature ranges from −9.1 °C (15.6 °F) in January to 22.8 °C (73.0 °F) in July, and the annual mean is 8.51 °C (47.3 °F). Typifying the influence of the East Asian Monsoon, close to three-fourths of the annual 428 millimetres (16.9 in) of precipitation occurs from June to September.

Climate data for Xinzhou (Xinfu District), elevation 870 m (2,850 ft), (1991–2020 normals, extremes 1981–2010)
Month	Jan	Feb	Mar	Apr	May	Jun	Jul	Aug	Sep	Oct	Nov	Dec	Year
Record high °C (°F)	13.4 (56.1)	17.5 (63.5)	26.9 (80.4)	36.4 (97.5)	37.6 (99.7)	37.7 (99.9)	37.9 (100.2)	35.1 (95.2)	34.5 (94.1)	29.1 (84.4)	21.8 (71.2)	14.7 (58.5)	37.9 (100.2)
Mean daily maximum °C (°F)	0.3 (32.5)	4.9 (40.8)	12.0 (53.6)	20.3 (68.5)	26.2 (79.2)	29.2 (84.6)	29.3 (84.7)	27.8 (82.0)	23.6 (74.5)	17.5 (63.5)	8.4 (47.1)	1.5 (34.7)	16.8 (62.1)
Daily mean °C (°F)	−8.1 (17.4)	−3.2 (26.2)	4.3 (39.7)	12.4 (54.3)	18.6 (65.5)	22.0 (71.6)	23.1 (73.6)	21.2 (70.2)	16.0 (60.8)	9.2 (48.6)	1.0 (33.8)	−6.2 (20.8)	9.2 (48.5)
Mean daily minimum °C (°F)	−14.1 (6.6)	−9.4 (15.1)	−2.3 (27.9)	4.7 (40.5)	10.6 (51.1)	14.9 (58.8)	17.6 (63.7)	16.0 (60.8)	9.8 (49.6)	2.9 (37.2)	−4.5 (23.9)	−11.7 (10.9)	2.9 (37.2)
Record low °C (°F)	−29.2 (−20.6)	−24.7 (−12.5)	−17.5 (0.5)	−8.1 (17.4)	−2.2 (28.0)	4.7 (40.5)	7.9 (46.2)	5.7 (42.3)	−2.6 (27.3)	−10.0 (14.0)	−24.6 (−12.3)	−30.0 (−22.0)	−30.0 (−22.0)
Average precipitation mm (inches)	2.4 (0.09)	4.4 (0.17)	10.5 (0.41)	21.9 (0.86)	33.7 (1.33)	62.4 (2.46)	111.8 (4.40)	106.2 (4.18)	58.4 (2.30)	28.9 (1.14)	12.4 (0.49)	2.3 (0.09)	455.3 (17.92)
Average precipitation days (≥ 0.1 mm)	1.6	2.3	3.2	5.4	6.4	10.6	12.5	12.0	8.7	5.9	3.3	1.6	73.5
Average snowy days	2.0	2.9	2.2	0.9	0	0	0	0	0	0.2	2.0	2.1	12.3
Average relative humidity (%)	54	50	46	43	44	57	76	79	76	67	62	57	59
Mean monthly sunshine hours	160.7	170.7	211.3	234.7	258.5	230.9	211.9	204.8	192.6	193.3	165.6	163.6	2,398.6
Percentage possible sunshine	53	56	57	59	58	52	48	49	52	57	55	56	54
Source: China Meteorological Administration

== Demographics ==
According to the seventh national census of Xinzhou, the prefecture city had 2,689,700 inhabitants in 2020, of whom the built-up (or metro) area was home to 1,446,400 inhabitants. Contrasting to the previous census conducted in 2000, there is a decline of 378,000 inhabitants (-12.32%, or -1.31% annually). Xinzhou is the eighth populous city in Shanxi. The illiteracy rate of Xinzhou is 2.39%, a 1.13% decrease since 2010. Xinzhou's sex ratio is 106:100 (Woman is 100).

== Tourism ==
Dai County is home to the AAAAA-rated Yanmen Pass, a mountain pass hosting a major fortification along the Great Wall. Mount Wutai is also one of four sacred mountains of Buddhism (中国佛教四圣山).

== Education ==
Xinzhou has numerous public high schools. Xin Zhou Di Yi Zhong Xue (Xin Zhou Number One High School) is considered the most prestigious public high school in this region.

Another public high school of interest is the nearby laboratory high school. It functions as an extension of the Xin Zhou Normal University. The third famous high school is the Xin Zhou Shi Yan Zhong Xue (Xin Zhou Experimental High School). This school was initiated as a public-private partnership. The school is partially funded by the Chinese government, follows national educational standards, and maintains close ties (and even joint faculty) with Xin Zhou Yi Zhong Xue; however, it maintains a greater independence from the government than traditional public schools. The experimental school also runs a small primary school program (generally only one classroom per grade level) which is populated almost exclusively by the children of Yi Zhong Xue and Shi Yan Zhong Xue teachers.

== Transportation ==
- China National Highway 108
- China National Highway 208
- G1812 Cangyu Expressway
- G55 Erenhot–Guangzhou Expressway
- Xinzhou Wutaishan Airport
