= Vasa Kellakiou =

Vasa Βάσα
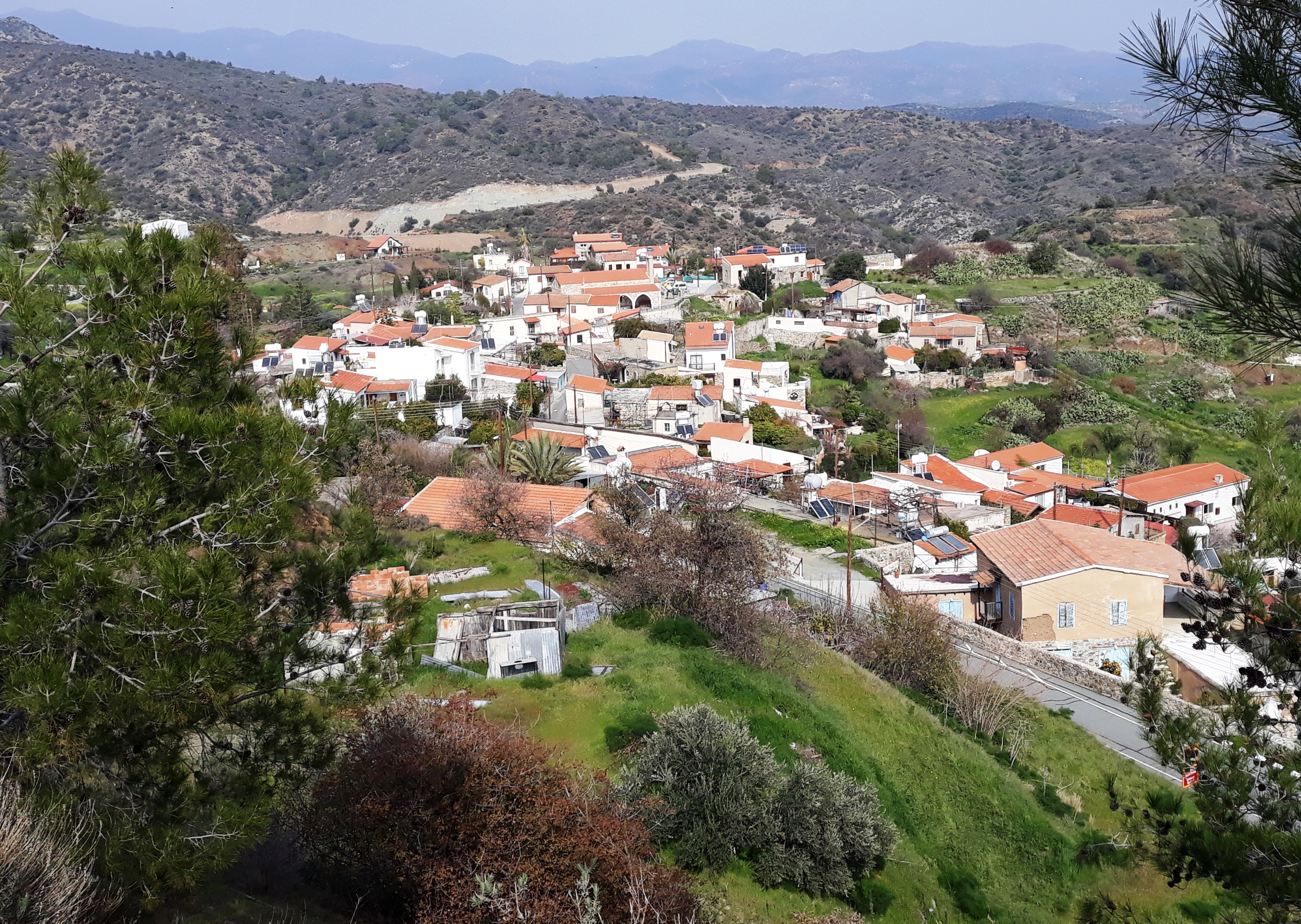

- Location in Cyprus
- Coordinates: 34°48′11″N 33°12′53″E
- Country: Cyprus
- District: Limassol District

Population (2001)
  - Total: 54
- Time zone: UTC+2 (EET)
  - Summer (DST): UTC+3 (EEST)
- Website: http://www.vasakellakiou.com.cy

Vasa Kellakiou (Greek: Βάσα Κελλακίου) is a village in the Limassol District of Cyprus, located 5 km (3 mi) northwest of Asgata.

It is known as Vasa Kellakiou (from the name of the neighboring village Kellaki) to distinguish it from the village of the same name in the province of Limassol, Vasa Koilaniou.

== Location ==
Vasa is located on the border of the province of Limassol. It is built at an altitude of 365 meters above sea level. In the southeast it borders with Asgata, in south with Monagroulli, to the west with Sanida, to the northwest with Vikla and Akapnou and to the east with Ora.

== History-Name ==
The name of the village is related to its location. In the old days, Vasa was the "base" of eight other neighboring villages. These villages do not exist today, only some ruins are preserved.

A historical fact that is known about the area is the existence of a large tunnel that was used to hide the inhabitants from the barbarians during their raids during the Venetian era. Today only the tunnel entrance exists.

== Natural environment ==
In Vasa, carobs, olives, almonds, fruit trees, citrus fruits and vegetables are cultivated. In addition, legumes are grown in the area.

== Holy temples ==
There are holy churches in the village: the Church of Agios Dimitrios (built 1830-1840) and the chapel of Panagia Vosienas .
