= Vikla =

Vikla Βίκλα
- Village
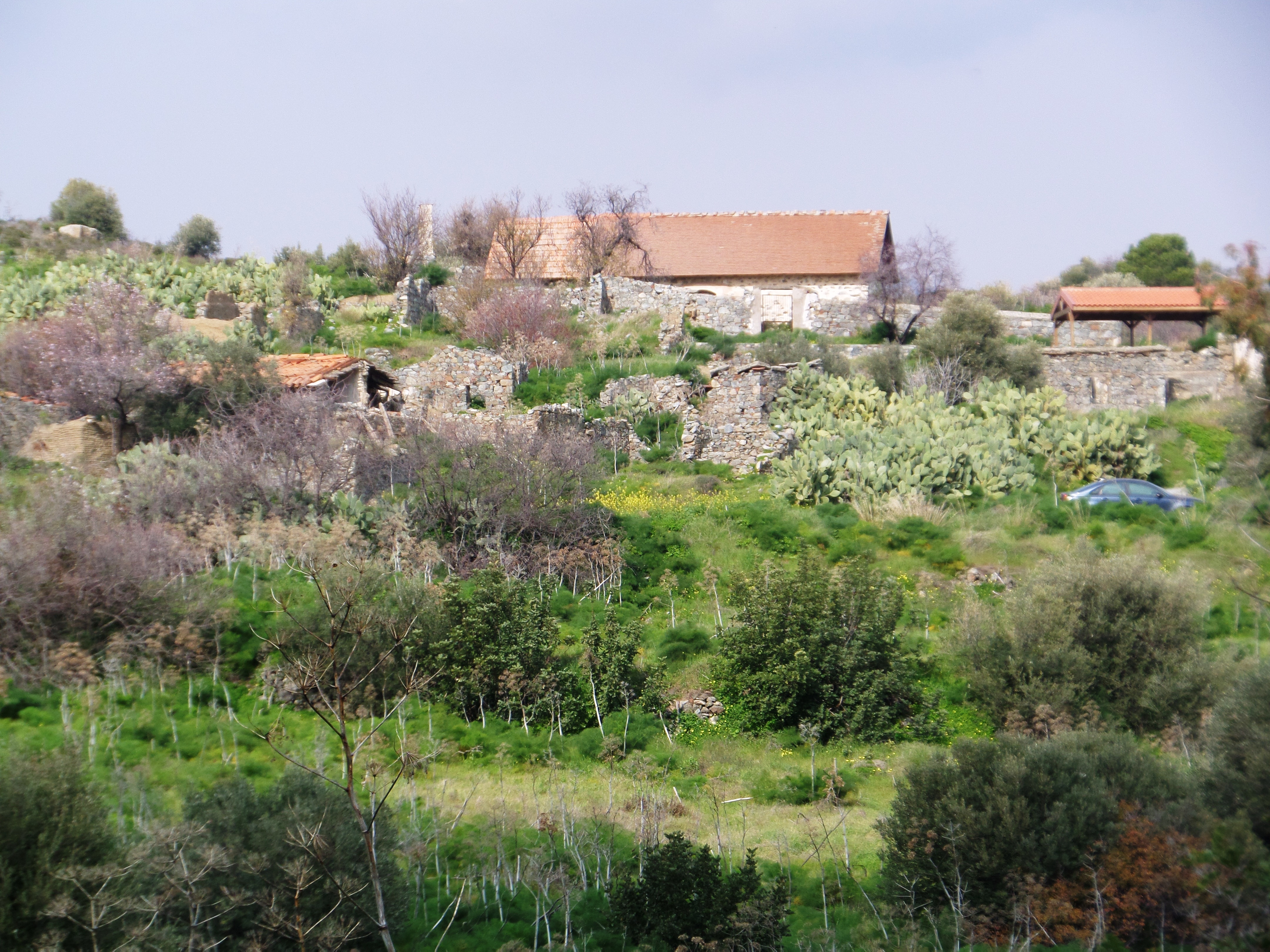

- Location in Cyprus
- Coordinates: 34°49′37″N 33°11′44″E
- Country: Cyprus
- District: Limassol District

Population (2021)
  - Total: 1
- Time zone: UTC+2 (EET)
  - Summer (DST): UTC+3 (EEST)

Vikla (Greek: Βίκλα) is a village in the Limassol District of Cyprus, located 4 km northeast of Kellaki. Vikla was formerly home to over 50 people, but has since been abandoned for decades. All buildings in Vikla except for a Church were burnt in a fire in 2005. The village however is the site of a golf course which was set up after Vikla was abandoned and is still being used today. Vikla is also visited once annually for a religious event held at the church.

== Location ==
Vikla is situated on the boundary between the Limassol and Larnaca districts. It is built at an altitude of 455 metres above sea level. To the south-east it borders Vasa Kellakiou, to the south Sanida, to the west Klonari, and to the north Akapnou.

== History ==
Vikla was a village of the Greater Commandery. In the mid-1980s it was abandoned by its remaining inhabitants. Today, only some ruins of houses and the church of Saint John the Merciful remain.

At present, a golf course has been developed in the area of the former village.

== Population ==
According to the population censuses carried out in Cyprus, the village's population was always small. After the mid-1980s, its inhabitants abandoned it completely.

== Sourcing ==
- Καρούζης, Γιώργος (2001). Περιδιαβάζοντας την Κύπρο: Λεμεσός (πόλη και επαρχία) [Wandering Around Cyprus: Limassol (City and District)] (πρώτη ed.). Λευκωσία: ΣΕΛΑΣ Κεντρο Μελετων Ερευνων & Εκδοσεων. p. 146-147. ISBN 9963-566-67-7.
