= Vasiliko =

Vasiliko (Greek: Βασιλικό) is a Greek toponym, meaning "royal place/land". It can refer to:

- Vasiliko, Achaea, a village in Achaea
- Vasiliko, Euboea, a village in Euboea
- Vasiliko, Ioannina, a village in the Ioannina regional unit
- Vasiliko, Messenia, a village in Messenia
- Vasilikos, Zakynthos, a village in eastern Zakynthos (Zante)
- Vasiliko, Cyprus, a port in Larnaca District on the Vasilikos river
- a village on the site of the ancient city Sicyon, in Corinthia
- Former name for the Bulgarian town of Tsarevo

== See also ==
- Vasilika (disambiguation)
- Vasiliki (disambiguation)
