= Kalavasos Railway =

Former narrow gauge railway in Larnaca District, Cyprus

Hellenic Mining Company Railway (Drapia-Kalavasos-Vasiliko)
Overview
- Headquarters: Nicosia
- Locale: Cyprus
- Dates of operation: 1938–1978

Technical
- Track gauge: 2 ft 6 in (762 mm)
- Length: 7.5 miles (12.1 km)

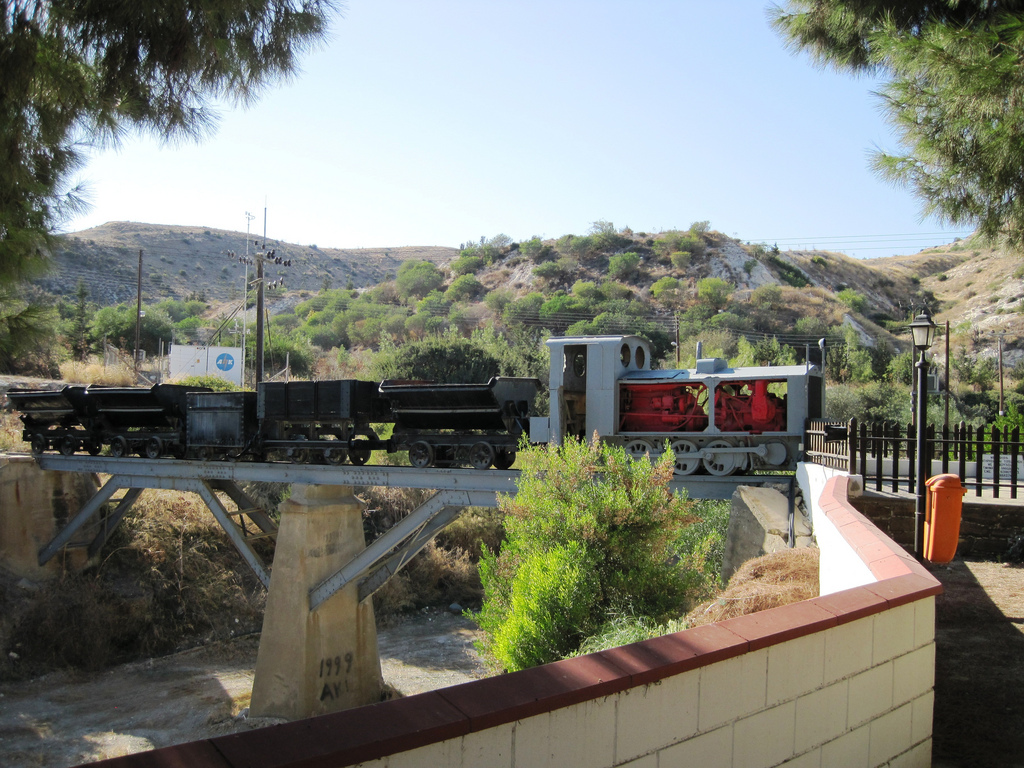
Railway bridge at Kalavasos

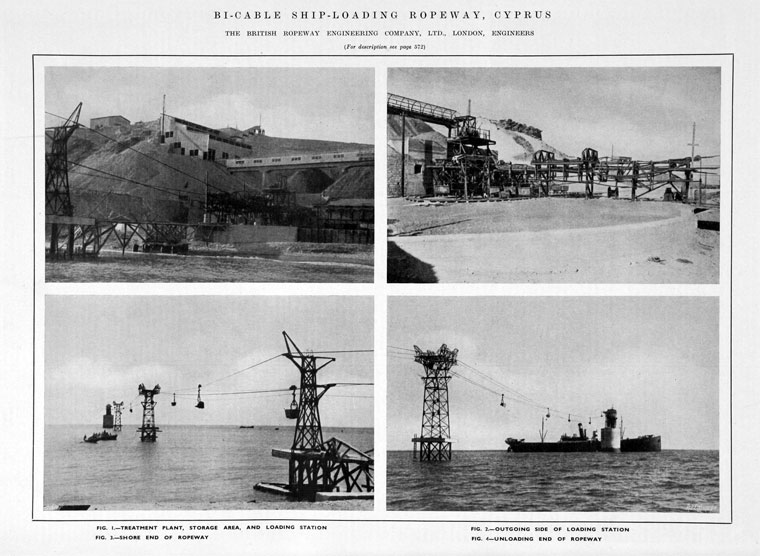
Ship-loading Ropeway at Vasiliko

The Hellenic Mining Company Railway at Kalavasos was a 2 ft 6 in (762 mm) narrow gauge railway that ran between Drapia and Vasiliko, in Larnaca District, Cyprus.. It had a length of 7.5 miles (12.1 km) and operated from 1938 to 1978.

By the Anonyme Hellenic Company of Chemical Products and Manures (Railway and Aerial Ropeway) Law, 1938 and the subsequent licence granted on 28 March 1938, the company (later called the Hellenic Mining Company) acquired powers to build a one track railway from its mining lease area near Kalavasos to the coast one mile west of Zyyi. The Act also enabled the construction of an aerial ropeway from the terminus to a point out in the sea, to load ships. The company had been granted a mining lease on 2 January 1937 on land situated near Asgata in Limassol District and land near Kalavasos, in Larnaca District.

The Hellenic Mining Company began exploitation of copper in the Kalavasos - Asgata area in 1937. While the mines were in operation, the mining company ran a railway to transport the material from Drapia to Vasiliko.

The railway was constructed between September 1937 and September 1938 and was 12 km (7.5 mi) long.

The marshalling yard at Drapia was 1.2 kilometres (3/4 mile) south-west of the village in the valley of the Vasilikos river, within the Drapia (later Ora) village area, close to the present Kalavasos dam. On leaving the Drapia yard, the railway crossed the Vasilikos river to the left (north-east) side and then ran down the valley close to the river until Kalavasos. Just south of the village, the line traversed the Kalavasos-Zyyi road on the level and then crossed the river (to the right or west side) over a two span bridge. This two span bridge, a train and some trucks in tow are preserved in situe, next to the "Maria" recreation area.

After transport down to the coast, the mined material was processed at Vasiliko. This was one of the main mineral processing complexes of the Hellenic Mining Company for copper and iron ore. Mineral products were loaded onto ships, either by barges or a ropeway which stretched over 1,000 ft (300 m) out to sea. This enabled loading of large ships direct from the processing plant, at the time prior to the building of the modern port (which has jetties and other facilities).There was a 5 track marshalling yard, which included the facility for off-loading the railway trucks.

A branch line about 3.2 kilometres (2 miles) long was laid in 1946 to the Hellenic Mining Company gypsum quarries east of Kalavassos, which joined the main line 4.43 kilometres (2.75 miles) north of Vasiliko. The main line was west of the Vasilikos river as it proceeded from Kalavasos down to the coast. The branch line had to cross the river, which it did by a single-span bridge, before climbing the river bank up to the level of the quarries.

There was no signalling. The trains from the branch line were fitted in between those of the main line by adhering strictly to pre-arranged times. The trains on the main line had a passing point at the village of Kalavasos.

The main line and branch line were 2 ft 6 in (762 mm) gauge. Separate 2 ft (610 mm) gauge systems carried trucks which brought material from the mines and quarries to hoppers feeding the trucks bound for Vasiliko.

The railway transported copper and pyrite from the mines of the Kalavasos-Asgata area, plus gypsum from quarries at Drapia and Kalavasos.

The mines and the railway operated until 1978.

== Rolling stock ==
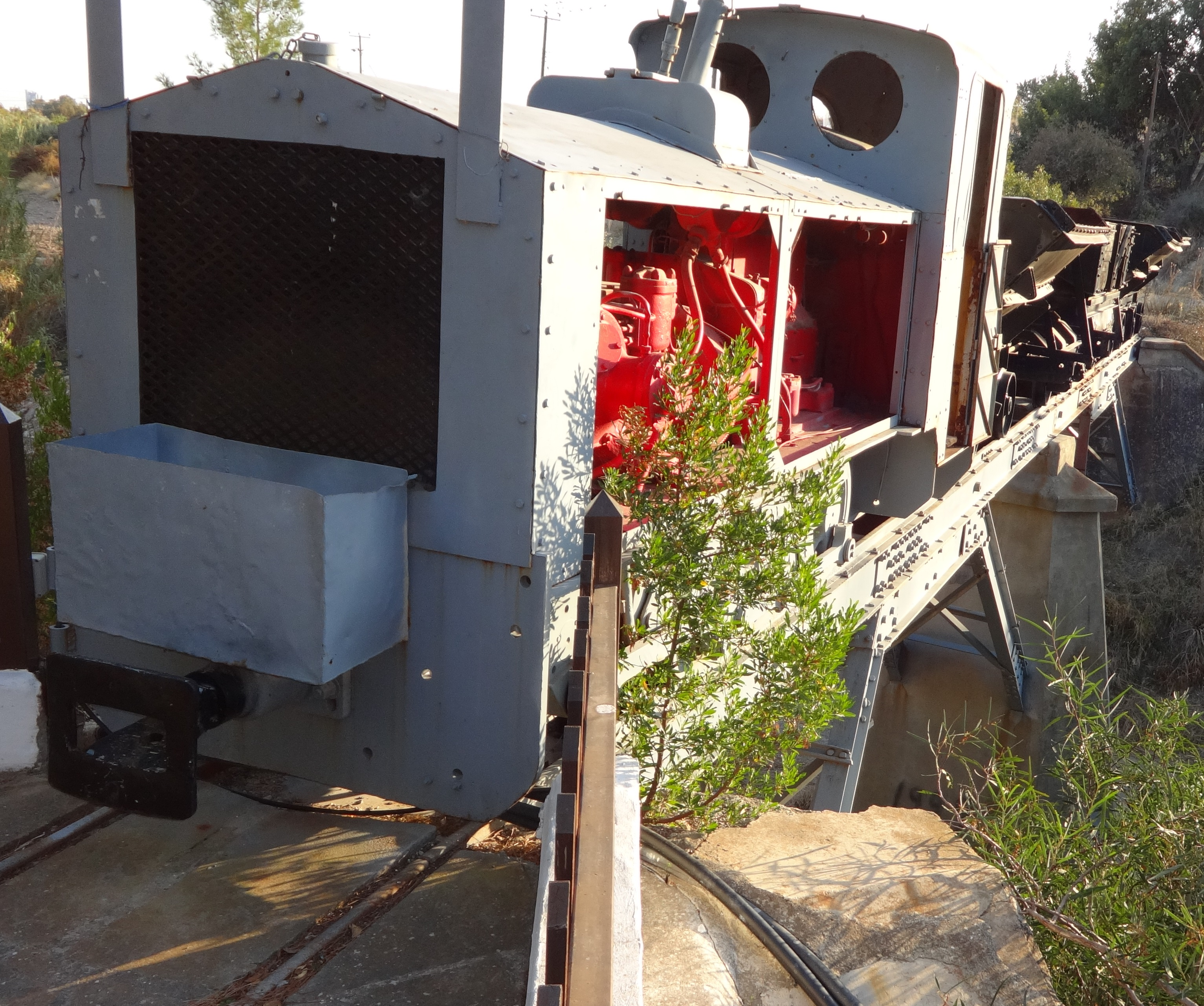
Diesel locomotive used on the Kalavasos railway

The railway had 6 locomotives (1956). The main line was worked by two 0-4-0 Diesel locomotives built by Plymouth of Pittsburgh. For backup or for extra train journeys there were two 0-6-0 diesel-electrics built in 1937 or 1938 by Orenstein & Koppel of Berlin. The branch line was worked by a 0-6-0 diesel-electric built in 1952 by Orenstein and Koppel in Dortmund, with one of the main line locomotives as backup. Finally, a 0-4-0 built by Plymouth was used as the Shunter at the quarry at the end of the branch line. There were also nearly 100 Side-tipping wagons.

Locomotive no. 1 is now sited on the railway bridge in Kalavasos village. It is a 0-6-0 diesel-electric built in 1937 or 1938 by Orenstein & Koppel of Berlin, type RL 8, serial no. 21018. Sited here since 1997.

== Areal ropeway ==
The final part of the journey for the mining products was a cableway running from the processing plant at the Vasiliko terminus to ships moored at sea. Because large ships could not moor close to the shore, initially the material from the mines was carried out to them in lighters. Then in 1939, an aerial transportation system was constructed. This was a cableway supported by three intermediate trestles or pylons, which were anchored in the sea, covering a total distance of about 1,750 feet (530 m). The intermediate pylons were metal 38 feet (12 m) high, supported on reinforced concrete foundations. The loading pylon at sea was made of reinforced concrete, with a height of 34 feet (10 m). There were two rope lines, the west side one taking full containers and the east line returning the empty containers, the rope being hauled at 274 feet (84 m) per minute. This system initially had a capacity of 100 tons per hour.

The system was constructed by the British Ropeway Engineering Company.

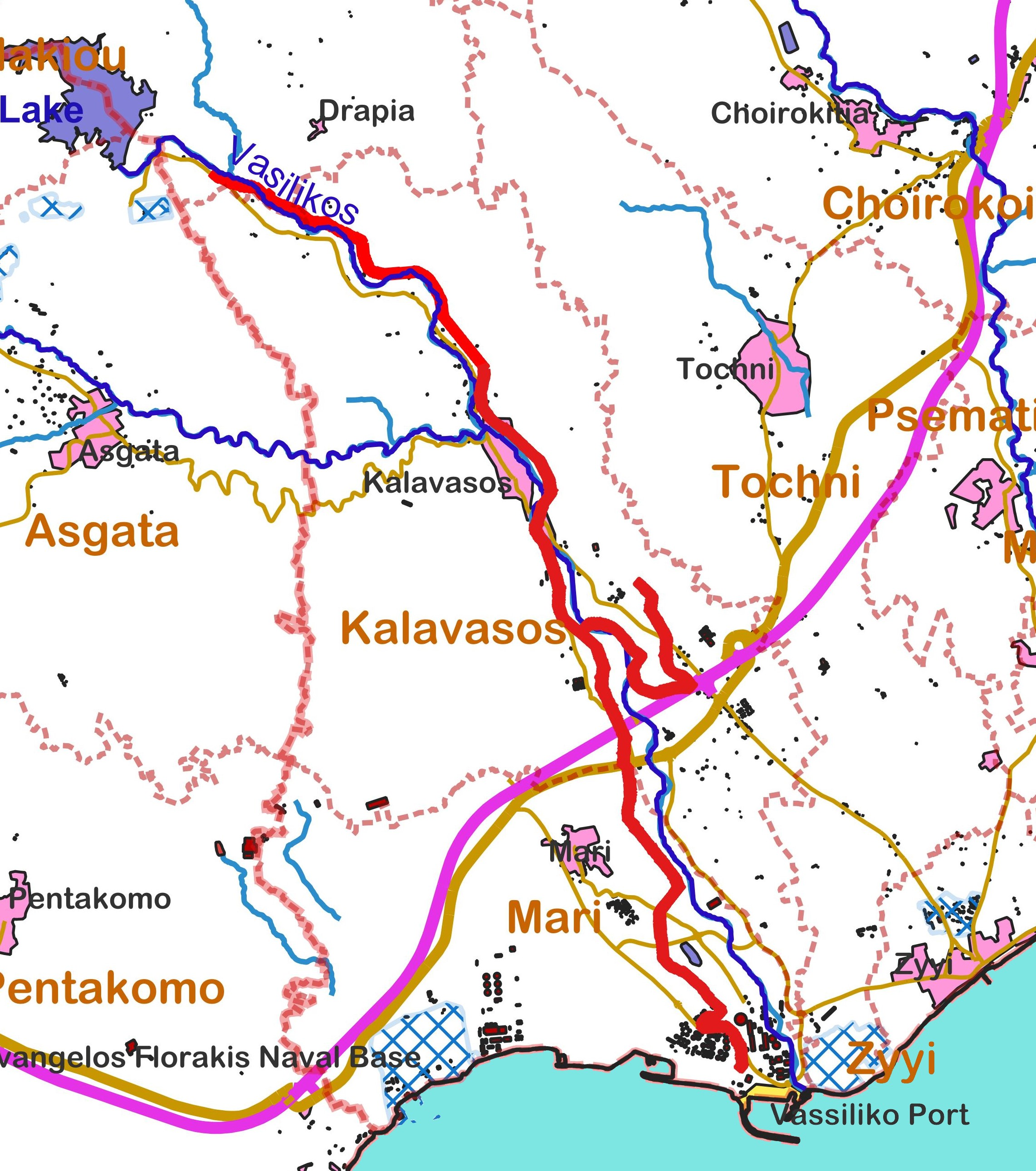
Route of the Kalavasos railway (shown in red). The present Limassol-Nicosia motorway (shown in purple) post-dates the railway.
