= Narrow-gauge railways in Cyprus =

There are currently no operational railways in Cyprus, but narrow-gauge railways operated in the country in the past:

- Cyprus Government Railway, 2 ft 6 in (762 mm), 76 miles (122 km), closed in 1951.
- Cyprus Mines Corporation also operated a 2 ft 6 in (762 mm) gauge railway in the Solea Valley until the Turkish invasion of 1974. Near Xeros, on a former shunting yard, various rolling stock items are rusting away.
- The Hellenic Mining Company railway from Drapia to a port at Vasiliko operated from 1938 to 1978, taking copper and other minerals from the Kalavasos mines.

The Cyprus Railway Museum is located at the former CGR Evrychou railway station in Nicosia District, and has a small demonstration track.

== See also ==
- Transport in Cyprus
