= 2 ft 6 in gauge railways =

Railway track gauge (762 mm)

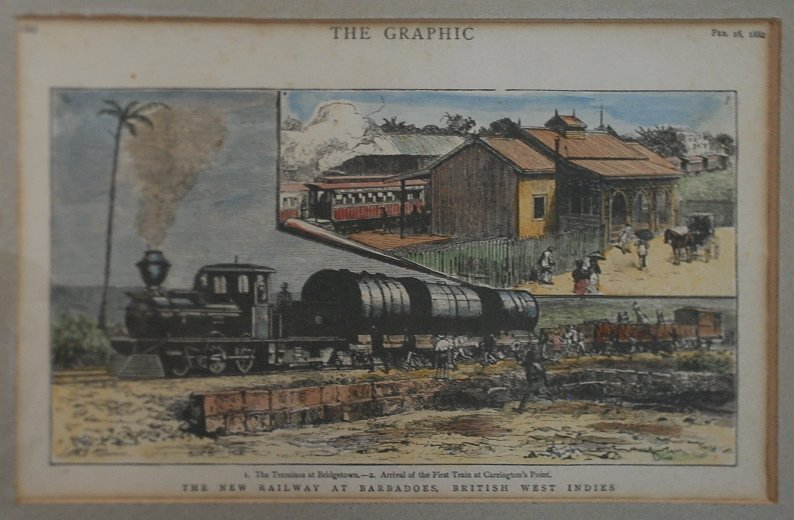
The Barbados Railway.

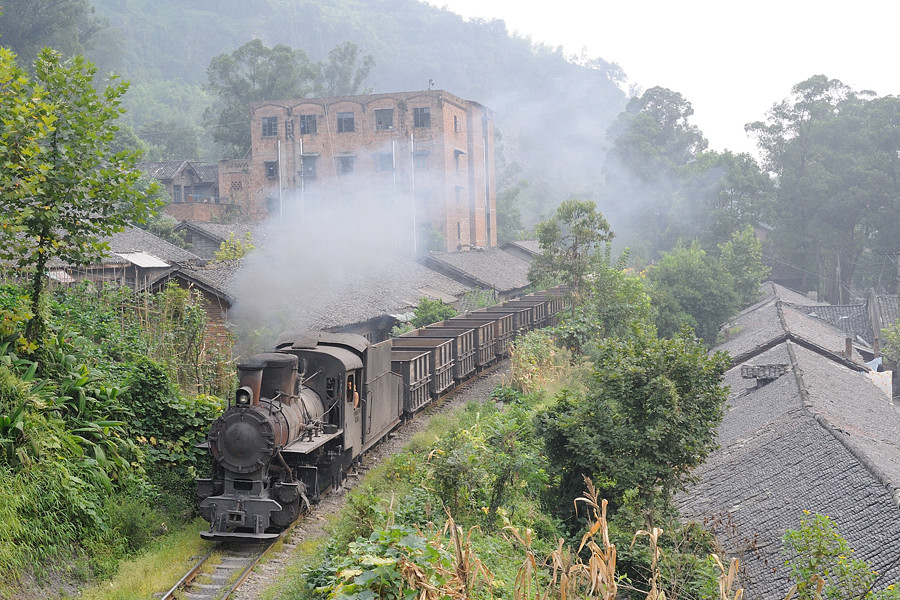
The Chinese Jiayang Coal Railway.

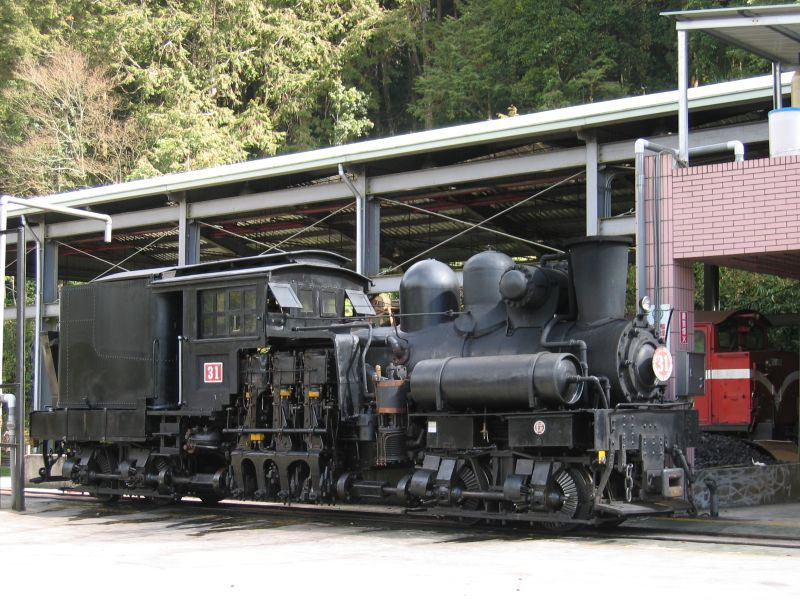
Alishan Forest Railway geared Shay locomotive in Taiwan.

2 ft 6 in (762 mm) gauge railways are narrow gauge railways with track gauge of 2 ft 6 in (762 mm). That gauge was particularly promoted by Thomas Hall and Everard Calthrop during the second half of the nineteenth century, especially in colonies of the British Empire.

Several Bosnian-gauge railways with 760 mm (2 ft 5 15/16 in) are found in south-eastern Europe. 760 mm (29.92 in) is well within engineering tolerance of 762 mm (30.0 in).

== Railways ==
Country/territory	Railway
Afghanistan	Kabul–Darulaman Tramway (defunct)
Antigua and Barbuda	80 km long sugar cane plantation network (defunct)
Australia	Crowes railway line (defunct); Gembrook railway line (Puffing Billy Railway) (operating); Palmwoods-Buderim Tramway (defunct); Tyers Valley tramway (defunct); Walhalla railway line (defunct) (Walhalla Goldfields Railway operates on a section of the track); Welshpool Jetty railway line (defunct); Whitfield railway line (defunct)
Barbados	Barbados Railway (converted from 3 ft 6 in or 1,067 mm gauge) (defunct)
Brazil	Estrada de Ferro Oeste de Minas (operating)
Chile	FC Caleta Coloso a Aguas Blancas (defunct); FC de Junin (defunct); FC de Antofagasta a Bolivia (crosses into Bolivia) (converted to 1,000 mm or 3 ft 3 3/8 in metre gauge) (operating)
China	Main article: Narrow gauge railways in China
Curaçao	Horse-drawn tram in Willemstad (Curaçao tramway)
Cyprus	Cyprus Government Railway (defunct); Hellenic Mining Company Railway at Kalavasos (defunct)
Denmark	Main article: History of rail transport in Denmark
Dominican Republic	Main article: Transport in the Dominican Republic § Railways
Haiti	Main article: History of rail transport in Haiti
India	Kalka–Shimla Railway (operating); Kangra Valley Railway (operating)
Iraq	Main article: Iraqi Republic Railways
Japan	Main article: 2 ft 6 in gauge railways in Japan
Mexico	Zacatlán Railroad (defunct)
Mozambique	Gaza Railway (operating)
Myanmar	Arakan Light Railway (operational status unknown); Madaya Light Railway (defunct)
Nepal	Janakpur and Kurtha (converted to 1,676 mm or 5 ft 6 in gauge in 2022)
Nigeria	Bauchi Light Railway (3 ft 6 in or 1,067 mm gauge lines also present) (defunct)
North Korea	Changjin Line (operating); Kanggye Line (operating); Paengmu Line (operating); Poch'ŏn Line (closed 1994); Samjiyŏn Line (converted to Standard-gauge in 2017); Sinhŭng Line (operating); Soho Line (operating); Ŭllyul Line (converted to Standard-gauge in 1973); Unsan Line (closed 1999)
Pakistan	Bannu–Tank Branch Line (opened 1913, closed 1995); Daud Khel–Lakki Marwat Branch Line (opened 1913, closed 1995); Larkana–Jacobabad Light Railway (opened 1924, converted to 5 ft 6 in or 1,676 mm 1956, closed 2005); Zhob Valley Railway (opened 1929, closed 1986)
Saint Kitts and Nevis	St. Kitts Scenic Railway (operating)
Sierra Leone	Sierra Leone Government Railway (defunct)
South Africa	Namaqualand Railway (defunct); Sheba Tramway (defunct)
South Korea	Suin Line (closed 1995 and later rebuilt to 1,435 mm or 4 ft 8 1/2 in standard gauge)
Sri Lanka	Kelani Valley Line (converted to 1,676 mm or 5 ft 6 in gauge in 1992)
Taiwan	Alishan Forest Railway (operating); Hualien–Taitung Line (converted to 3 ft 6 in or 1,067 mm gauge) (operating); Taiwan Sugar Railways (operating)
United Kingdom	Main article: 2 ft 6 in gauge railways in the United Kingdom
United States	Main article: 2 ft 6 in gauge railroads in the United States

== See also ==
- Heritage railway
- Large amusement railways
- List of track gauges
