= Vasilika =

Vasilika (Greek: Βασιλικά) is a Greek toponym, meaning "royal place/land". It can refer to:

- Vasilika, Boeotia
- Vasilika, Euboea
- Vasilika, Heraklion
- Vasilika, Lesbos
- Vasilika, Phthiotis
- Vasilika, Thessaloniki
  - Vasilika refugee camp

== See also ==
- Vasiliki (disambiguation)
- Vasiliko (disambiguation)
