= Drapia, Cyprus =

Depopulated village in Larnaca District, Cyprus

Drapia Δράπεια
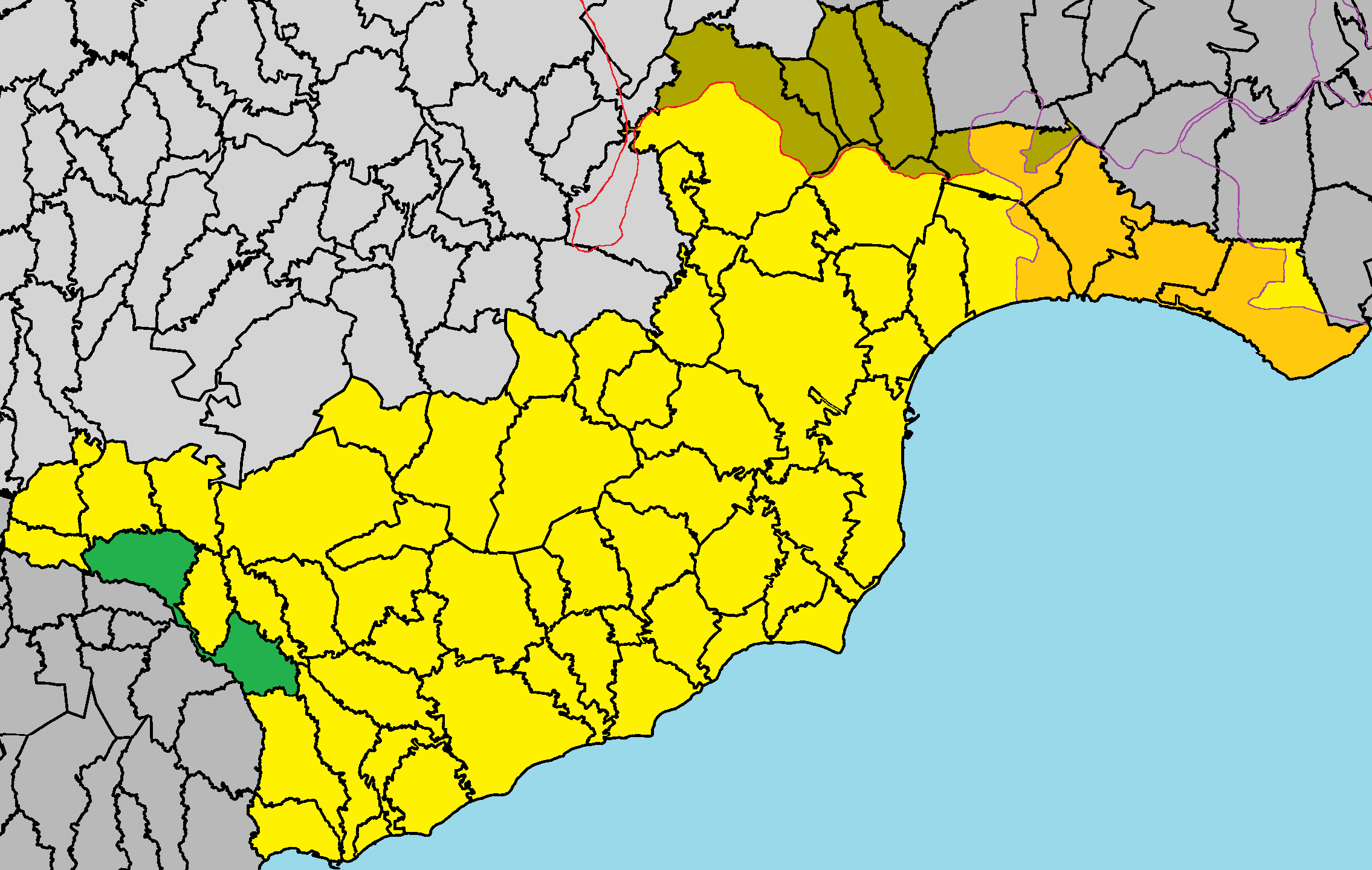
- Larnaca District with Ora village area in green. The east segment is the Drapia - Parsada area (annexed 1948).

- Location in Cyprus
- Coordinates: 34°48′06″N 33°16′45″E
- Country: Cyprus
- District: Larnaca
- Elevation: 607 ft (185 m)

Population (1976, 1995,2015)
  - Total: less than 10
- Time zone: UTC+2 (EET)
  - Summer (DST): UTC+3 (EEST)
- Post code: 7719

Drapia (or Drapeia) (Greek: Δράπεια) is a depopulated village in the Larnaca District of Cyprus. Since 1948, the settlements of Parsata and Drapia are included in the jurisdiction of the Ora village authority area. However the Parsada-Drapia village area is separate from the Ora village area, only joined by a thin strip of territory along the Vasilikos river 3.3 km (2.1 mi) long.

Drapia lies on the Kalavasos to Lageia (Layia) road, about 4 km (2.5 mi) north-west of Kalavasos. To the north, it borders the village of Parsada. It lies on the east side of the Vasilikos river and the village area is dissected by its minor tributaries.

The Hellenic Mining Company began exploitation of copper in the Kalavasos-Asgata area in 1937 and the mining company employed many local inhabitants. A number of the miners resided in Drapia. The village was substantially abandoned after the closure of the copper mines in 1978.

While the mines were in operation, the mining company ran a railway to transport material from Drapia to the port at Vasiliko. The marshalling yard was 1.2 kilometres (3/4 mile) south-west of the village in the valley of the Vasilikos river, within the Drapia (later Ora) village area, close to the present Kalavasos dam. The railway was built in 1937-1938 and was 12 km (7.5 mi) long.

Historical documents refer to the village and its church being in existence from the Venetian period. The village church is dedicated to St. George.

== Population ==
Population according to the Census and other sources

Date	Houses	Males	Fem.	Total Pop.
1572	13			
1612	16			
1672	12			
1831	10	14		
1881	4	11	10	21
1891	14	16	5	21
1901	9	10	1	11
1911	5	10	3	13
1921	3	6	4	10
1931	9	13	12	25
1976		2	2	4
1995				3
2015				7

N.B. Drapia was included with Kalavasos for the 1946 and 1960 censuses. Later it was included with Ora.
