= Madaya Light Railway =

The Madaya Light Railway was a 2 ft 6 in (762 mm) narrow gauge railway that terminated in Mandalay, Myanmar. The first section to Toungbyon, 8 miles long, opened in 1912. The railway was extended a further 8 miles to Madaya in 1917. The company operating the line went into liquidation in 1919, and the railway was taken over by the Government. The line was closed in 1927 when it was replaced by a metre gauge line. The first four locomotives for the line were obtained second hand from the Thanton – Duyinzaik Railway.
