= Vasiliko, Cyprus =

Port and industrial area in Larnaca District, Cyprus

Vasiliko Βασιλικό
- Port and industrial area
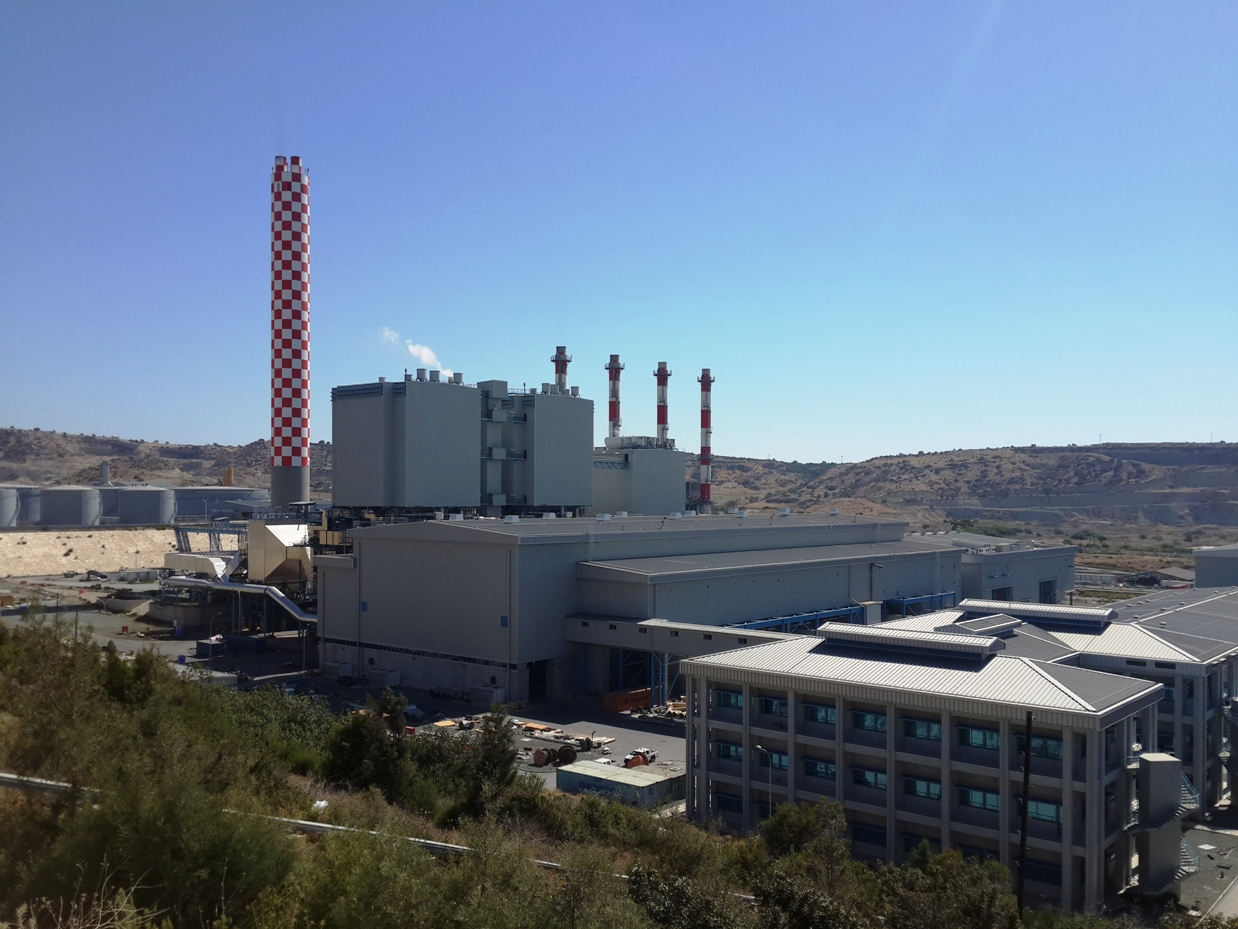
- Vasilikos power station

- Location in Cyprus
- Coordinates: 34°43′07″N 33°19′02″E
- Country: Cyprus
- District: Larnaca
- Elevation: 66 ft (20 m)
- Time zone: UTC+2 (EET)
  - Summer (DST): UTC+3 (EEST)
- Post code: 7736

Vasiliko (or Vassiliko) (Greek: Βασιλικό) is port and industrial area in Larnaca District, Cyprus, at the mouth of the Vasilikos river, 2.5 km (1.6 mi) west of Ziyi. Vasiliko is in the Mari village authority area.

Vasiliko is a recent settlement, initially created to meet the needs of the Kalavasos mines, by processing and exporting the ore of the area. The name comes from the Vasilikos river. The construction of the Kalavasos dam (1985) has greatly limited the amount of water that flows in the Vasilikos to the sea at Vasiliko.

The Hellenic Mining Company began exploitation of copper in the Kalavasos - Asgata area in 1937. While the mines were in operation, the mining company ran a railway to transport material from Drapia to Vasiliko. After transport down to the coast, the material was processed at Vasiliko, and loaded onto ships, either by barges or a ropeway which stretched over 1,000 ft (300 m) out to sea. This enabled loading of large ships direct from the processing plant, at the time prior to the building of the modern port (which has jetties and other facilities).There was a 5 track marshalling yard, which included the facility for off-loading the railway trucks

The railway was built in 1937-1938 and was 12 km (7.5 mi) long.

The port was rebuilt in 1980, after the railway ceased operation. With the extension of the land into the sea, the dredging and the construction of jetties, ships can now dock at the port.

The cement factory, next to the port, began in 1966.

The Vasilikos Power Station, in the western part of Vasiliko, began operating in the early 2000's and is the newest power plant of Electricity Authority of Cyprus. It was still under development at the time of the Evangelos Florakis Naval Base explosion of 11 July 2011.

Vasiliko is the site for petroleum storage facilities, which were previously in the Larnaca area.

The closed Cyprus Chemical Fertilisers Industries plant will host a Liquefied natural gas(LNG) storage and re-gasification facility. However, the project to establish a LNG import terminal at Vasiliko has been delayed by design flaws and structural issues.

The population of Vasiliko was 180 in 1973 and 171 in 1976. In the subsequent censuses the population is included with Mari. The population fluctuates depending on the prevailing economic situation of the port's industries. During 1954-1957 about 250 people lived Vasiliko, while recently it is much reduced.
