= Kalavasos =

Kalavasos: Καλαβασός (Greek); Kalavason (Turkish)
- Village
- Location in Cyprus
- Coordinates: 34°46′19″N 33°17′45″E
- Country: Cyprus
- District: Larnaca District

Population (2011)
  - Total: 737
- Time zone: UTC+2 (EET)
  - Summer (DST): UTC+3 (EEST)
- Website: http://www.kalavasos.org/

Kalavasos (Greek: Καλαβασός; Turkish: Kalavason) is a village in the Larnaca District of Cyprus, located 6 km north of Zygi, on the river Vasilikos. In its vicinity, there are copper mines.

The name is reputed to mean beautiful (καλά) wooded valley (βάσσα) in old Greek.

== History ==
Kalavasos has been a settlement since the New Stone Age. The Tenta archaeological site is located in Kalavasos.

Between 1938-1978 the Hellenic Mining Company railway ran through Kalavasos, taking copper and other minerals from the Kalavasos mines to a port at Vasiliko

== Gallery ==
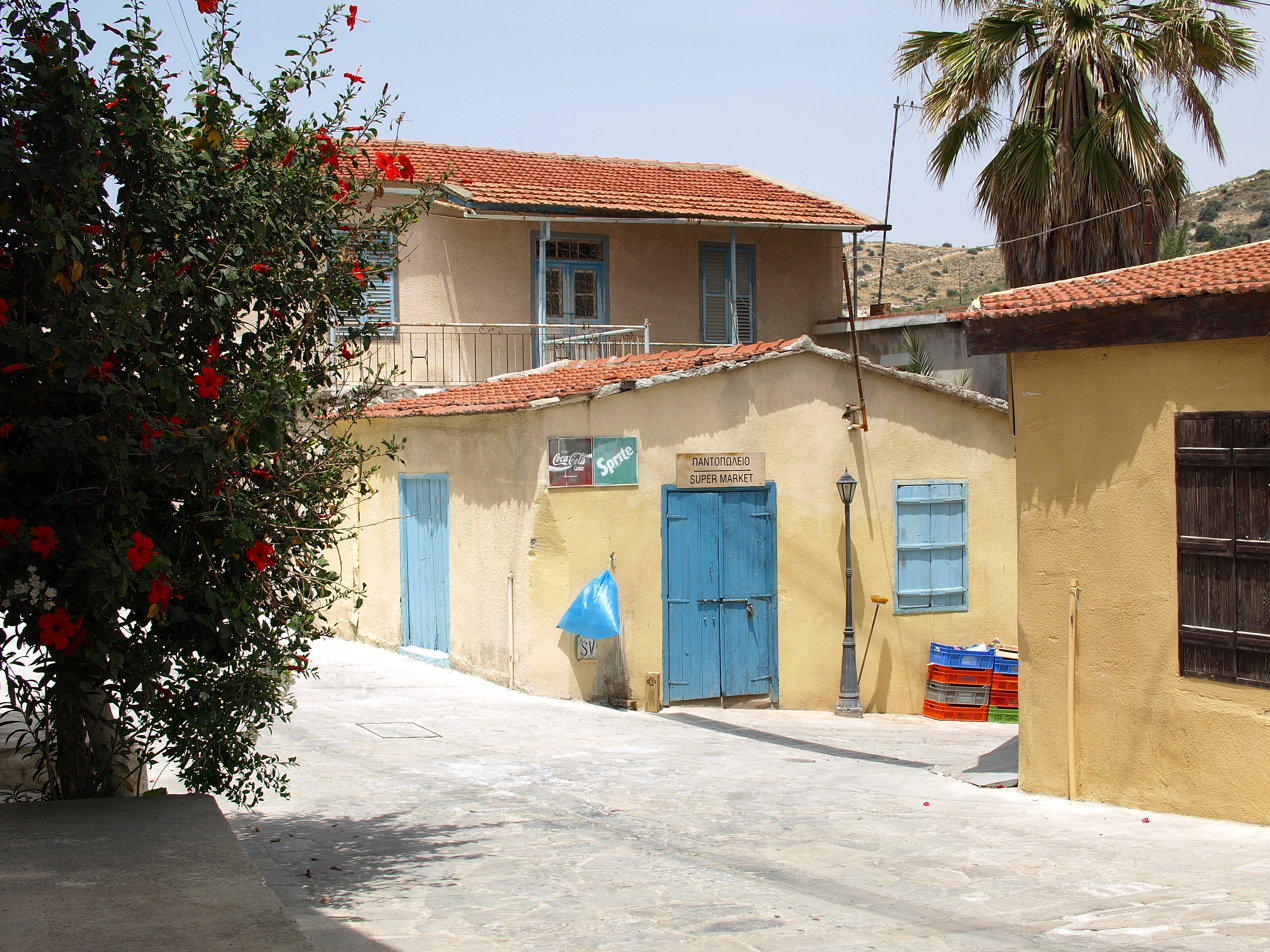
A street in Kalavasos.

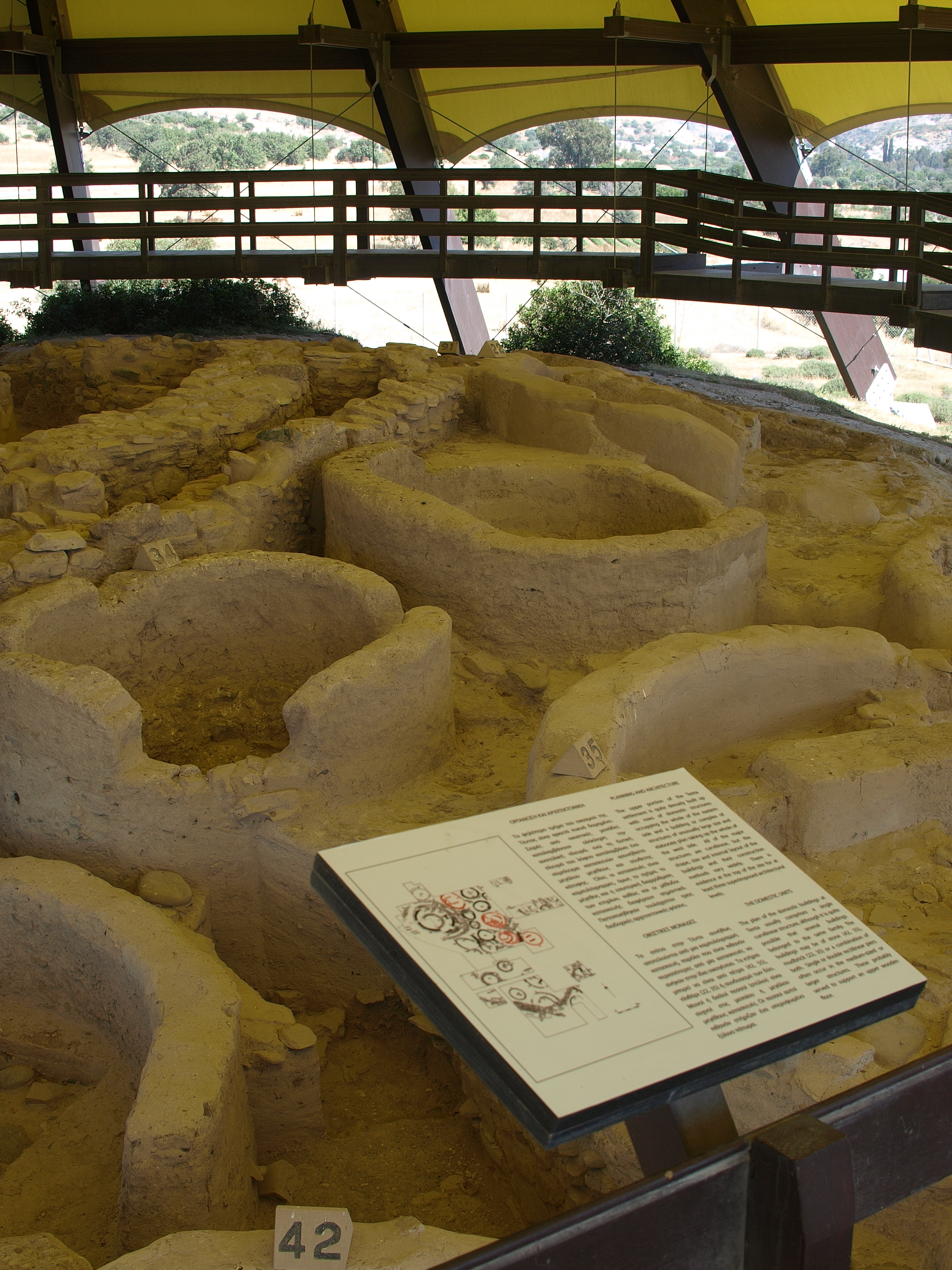
The Kalavasos-Tenta archaeologic site, located 4 km south of Kalavasos.
