= Eptagoneia =

Eptagoneia Επταγώνεια
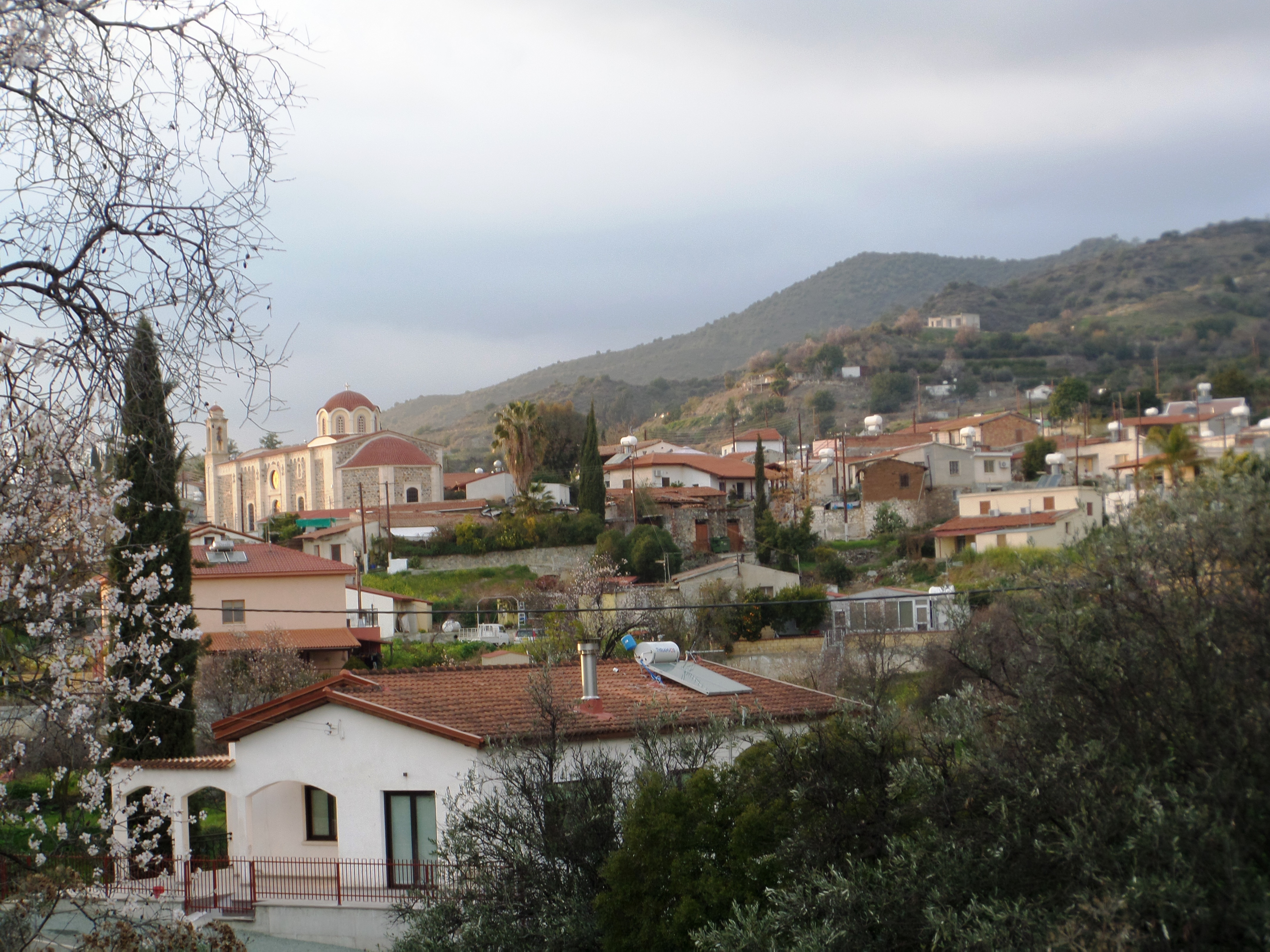

- Location in Cyprus
- Coordinates: 34°50′49″N 33°9′27″E
- Country: Cyprus
- District: Limassol District
- Elevation: 1,558 ft (475 m)

Population (2001)
  - Total: 329
- Time zone: UTC+2 (EET)
  - Summer (DST): UTC+3 (EEST)

Eptagoneia (Greek: Επταγώνεια) or Eftagoneia (Εφταγώνεια) is a village in the Limassol District of Cyprus, located 4 km north of Kellaki.

Also it is located 28 km from Limassol town.

Eptagoneia is at the foot of Papoutsa and belongs to the Pitsilia geographic area and lies in a semi-mountainous area. It is near Arakapas, Kellaki, Akapnou some Limassol's villages and near Melini and Ora villages that belongs in the Larnaca district.

== Etymology ==
The name of the village is a compound word which consists of two words in Greek; "epta" (επτά: meaning seven)" and "goneia" (γωνιά: meaning corner). There are two versions as to how the village got its name:

1. The formation of the territory of the region is characterized by many corners.
2. The village had seven neighborhoods in the past.

== History ==
The earliest written references to Eptagonia date from the period of Frankish rule. It was one of the estates held by the Knights Templar in Cyprus. After the dissolution of the order, the village came under the control of the Knights Hospitaller, whose headquarters were at Kolossi. Thus, it became part of the Grand Commandery.

== Βιβλιογραφία ==
- Καρούζης, Γιώργος (2001). Περιδιαβάζοντας την Κύπρο: Λεμεσός (πόλη και επαρχία) [Exploring Cyprus: Limassol (city and district)] (πρώτη ed.). Λευκωσία: ΣΕΛΑΣ Κεντρο Μελετων Ερευνων & Εκδοσεων. p. 147-148. ISBN 9963-566-67-7.
