= History of rail transport in Haiti =

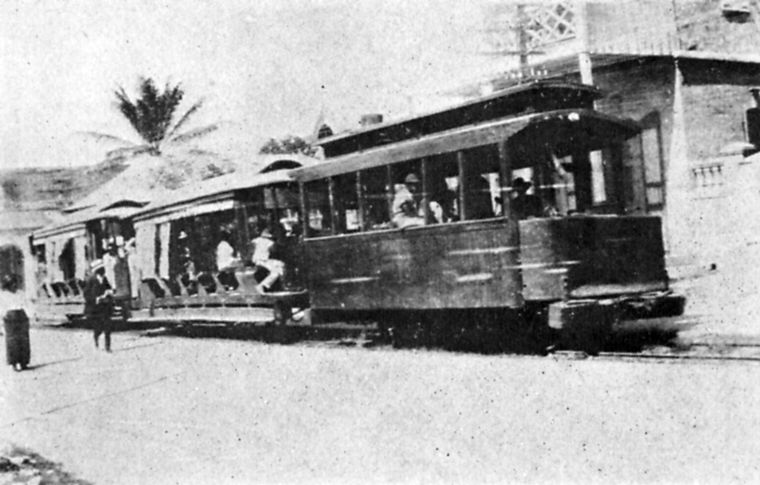
A train to Léogâne in 1921

There are currently no functioning railways in Haiti, and there have never been any rail connections with the neighbouring Dominican Republic. However, between 1876 and the 1970s, various tramways and railways ran in the country. A tram network operated in the capital, Port-au-Prince, between 1897 and 1932. Three railway lines, along with some industrial lines, constituted the Haitian national rail network. The first horse drawn street tramway opened in 1876, with rural railways constructed later.

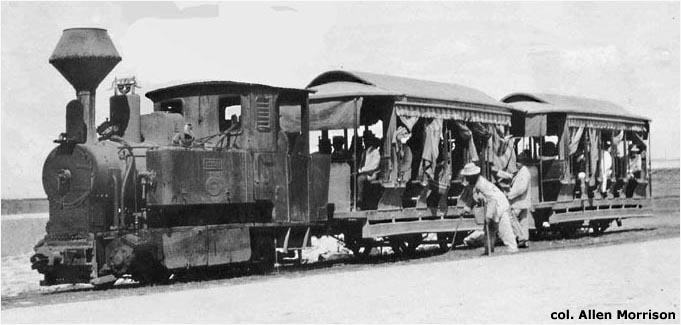
Postcard showing Krauss locomotive and two passenger cars in Haiti

== Horse tramways ==
In 1876, a franchise for the construction of a street railway in Port-au-Prince was awarded to a group of New York City financiers. They founded the Compagnie des Chemins de Fer de Port-au-Prince (CCFPP). Six open cars were ordered from J. G. Brill and Company of Philadelphia in 1877 and a tramway service connecting Croix des Bossales with Champ de Mars began in 1878. The venture was initially successful, but was hurt by competition from buses from 1880. In 1884, the company owned 50 to 60 horses, 10 passenger cars and 16 freight cars. The CCFPP fell into bankruptcy in 1885 and the last tram ran in 1888.

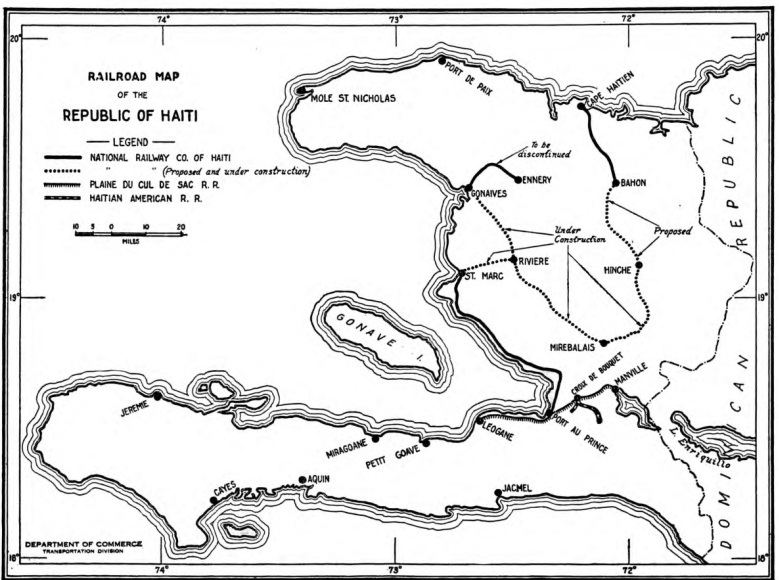
Rail map as of 1925

== Steam railways ==
In 1896, the Comite des Negociants d'Haiti (Haitian Trader's Committee) began to restore the closed horse tramway system and to build two new rural lines. A new company, Societe des Tramways de Port-au-Prince, ordered the following equipment:

- One 8-ton steam locomotive from H. K. Porter, United States (named President Sam)
- Five 12-ton steam locomotives from Krauss, Germany
- Three steam locomotives from Ateliers de Tubize, Belgium
- Ten open passenger cars from the Jackson and Sharp Company, US

=== Port-au-Prince ===
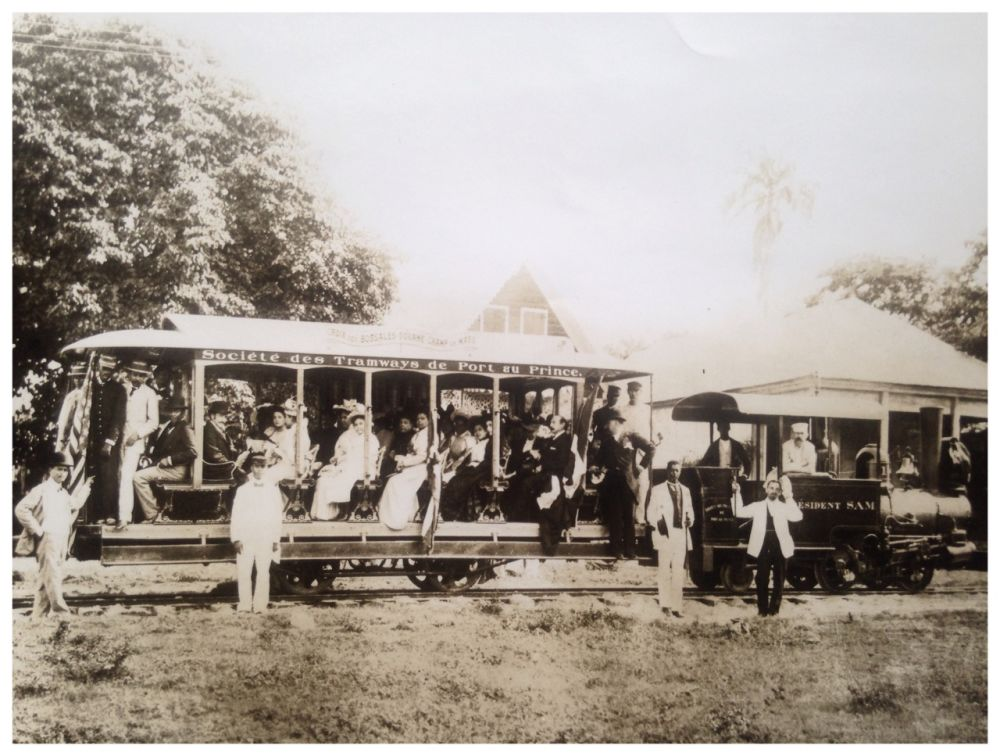
President Tirésias Simon Sam during the inauguration of the tramways in Port-au-Prince, 18 April 1897

Steam-hauled tram services in Port-au-Prince began in April 1897. Between 1912 and 1918, there were plans to electrify the system, but these did not come to fruition. Instead, a small railcar, based on automobile parts, was introduced. This iteration of the tramway closed in 1932.

=== Rural lines ===
The rural lines were operated by a separate company, Compagnie des Chemins de Fer de la Plaine du Cul-de-Sac (CCFPCS), but the two companies shared their rolling stock. The track gauge, in both cases, was 2 ft 6 in (762 mm) narrow gauge. There were two routes:

- Port-au-Prince to Léogâne (36 km)
- Port-au-Prince to Manneville (43 km)

Following the US occupation of Haiti in 1915, the CCFPCS was taken over by the Haitian American Sugar Company (Hasco) and renamed Chemin de Fer Central. Hasco used the following locomotives:

- One 32 ton 2-6-0
- One 36 ton 2-6-0
- One 15 ton 0-4-0

These might possibly be the three locomotives from Ateliers de Tubize (see above) or they might be new locomotives. The 0-4-0 carries the note "Cie.H.Duw. 2" but whether this is the name of the maker, or of a previous owner, is unclear.

=== Saint-Marc line ===
In 1905, a new company, Compagnie Nationale, built a 3 ft 6 in (1,067 mm) narrow gauge steam railway from Port-au-Prince to Saint-Marc (100 km). The track was later extended another 30 km east to Verrettes. There was also a line from Cap-Haïtien to Bahon, but it is unclear whether this connected with the Saint-Marc line and whether they were of the same gauge.

== Industrial railways ==
As well as the passenger-carrying railways, there were also industrial railways serving coffee and sugar and sisal plantations.

== Closures ==
By the mid-1950s, two public-service railways totalling 187 mi (301 km) remained operating. All the railways are now closed.

== See also ==
- History of Haiti
- History of rail transport by country
