= Vasilikos (river) =

River in Larnaca District, Cyprus

Vasilikos Βασιλικός (in Greek) • Vasilikos
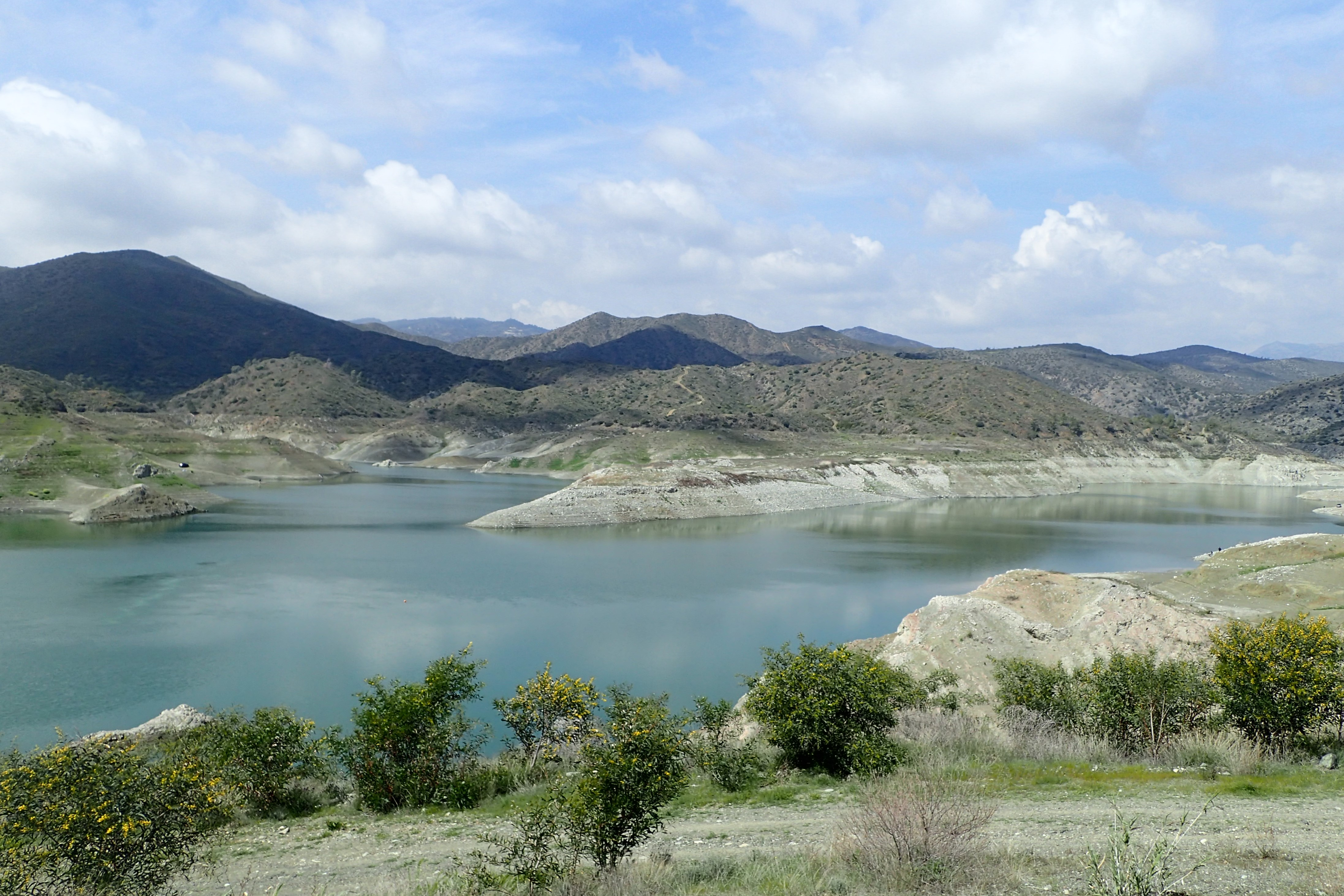
- Vasilikos River at Kalavasos Dam

Location
- Country: Cyprus
- District: Larnaca District, Limassol District

Physical characteristics
- Source
  - location: Ayii Vavatsinias, Troodos Mountains
  - coordinates: 34°54′2″N 33°11′4″E
  - elevation: 1,342 m (4,403 ft)
- Mouth
  - location: Vasiliko
  - coordinates: 34°43′10″N 33°19′11″E
  - elevation: 0 m (0 ft)
- Length: 32 km (20 mi)
- Basin size: 151 km^{2} (58 mi^{2})

Basin features
- Tributaries
  - left: Exovounia
  - right: Asgata
- Waterbodies: Agioi Vavatsinias dam reservoir, Kalavasos dam reservoir (Kalavasos lake)

The Vasilikos (Greek: Βασιλικός, Turkish: Vasiliko) is a river in Larnaca District, Cyprus, with small section in Limassol District. The river starts just south of Machairas Forest in the Troodos Mountains in the village area of Ayii Vavatsinias, and flows south-east to the sea at the port of Vasiliko (or Vassiliko).

The Vasilikos is an intermittent river, as are its tributaries. It typically has peak flow in February and March, while from July to October the river is dry. The river has a length of 32 km (20 mi) and the area of the river basin (catchment area) is 151 km^{2} (58 mi^{2}).

There are two dams on the river, Ayii Vavatsinias Dam, near the village of that name, and Kalavasos Dam, 5.5 km (3.4 mi) north-west of Kalavasos village. The Ayii Vavatsinias dam was built in 1981 and its reservoir has a capacity of 53 thousand m^{3} (1,900 thousand ft^{3}). Kalavasos dam was built in 1983-1985 and its reservoir has a capacity of 17 million m^{3} (600 million ft^{3}).

The Vasilikos, starting in the north of the village area of Ayii Vavatsinias, flows south to the Ayii Vavatsinias dam for a distance of 4 km (2.5 mi) and then continues south until the village of Akapnou, where there is a sharp perpendicular bend to an easterly course.

The section of the river running from Eptagonia to Akapnou to Akapnou forest was affected by the Kalo Chorio - Arakapas - Akapnou fault. Due to this fault, the river Vasilikos flows along the fault valley at almost right angles with the previous course. However its (minor) tributaries in this area continue to flow in the same orientation as the original, with counter-current streams on the opposite slopes of the fault valley.

At the end of Akapnou forest, the river returns to a south-easterly direction, where it is joined by the Exovounia, and reaches the Kalavasos dam. On Kitchener's survey map, this part of the Vasilikos is given the name Megas Potamos (large river). The reservoir extends about 2 km (1.2 mi) upstream. After the dam the river flows through Kalavasos and on to the port of Vassiliko, for a distance of 13.5 km (8.4 mi).

Its major tributary is the Asgata or Argaki tis Asgatas (stream of Asgata), which joins it at the northern edge of Kalavasos village. The length of the Asgata is 13.1 km (8.1 mi) and it broadly follows the same orientation as the Akapnou fault.

A smaller tributary, the Exovounia, has a length of 6.3 km (3.9 mi). Where it joins the Vasilikos just north of Kalavasos dam, its direction is south-easterly, like the Vasilikos downstream from the confluence. However, further upstream the Exovounia has an easterly section running parallel with the Akapnou fault.

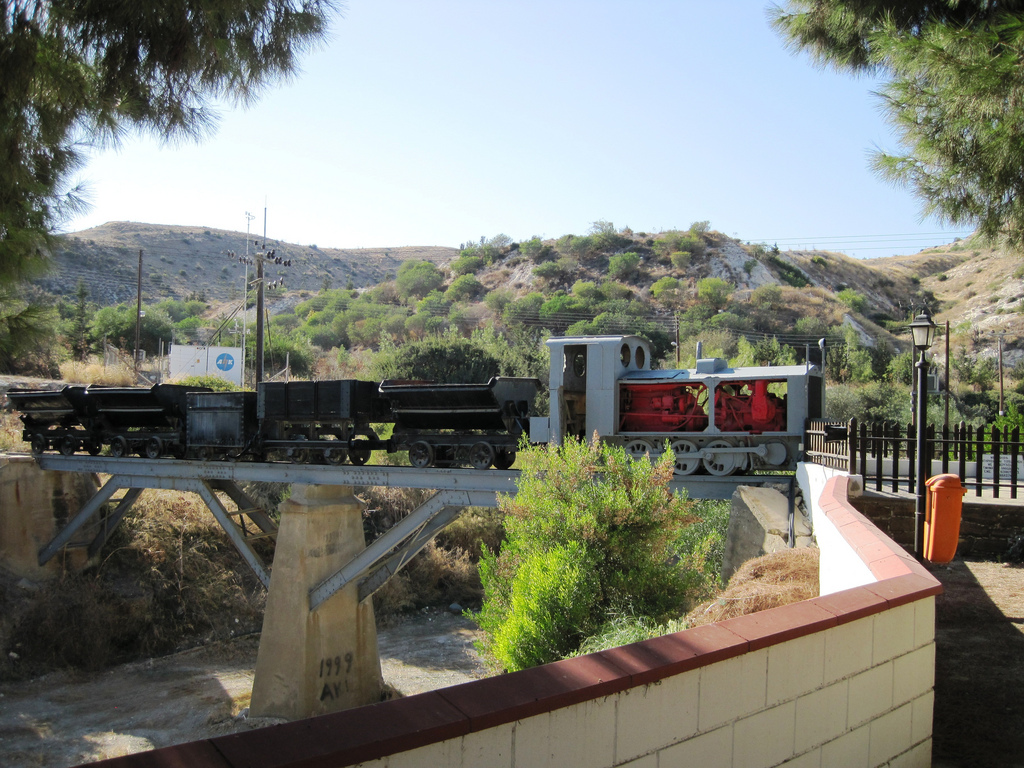
Dry bed of the river at Kalavasos

The water measuring station at Kalavasos recorded a Mean Annual flow of the river Vasilikos of 3.9 million m^{3} (140 million ft^{3}), with the contributing catchment area at this point being 130 km^{2} (50 mi^{2}).

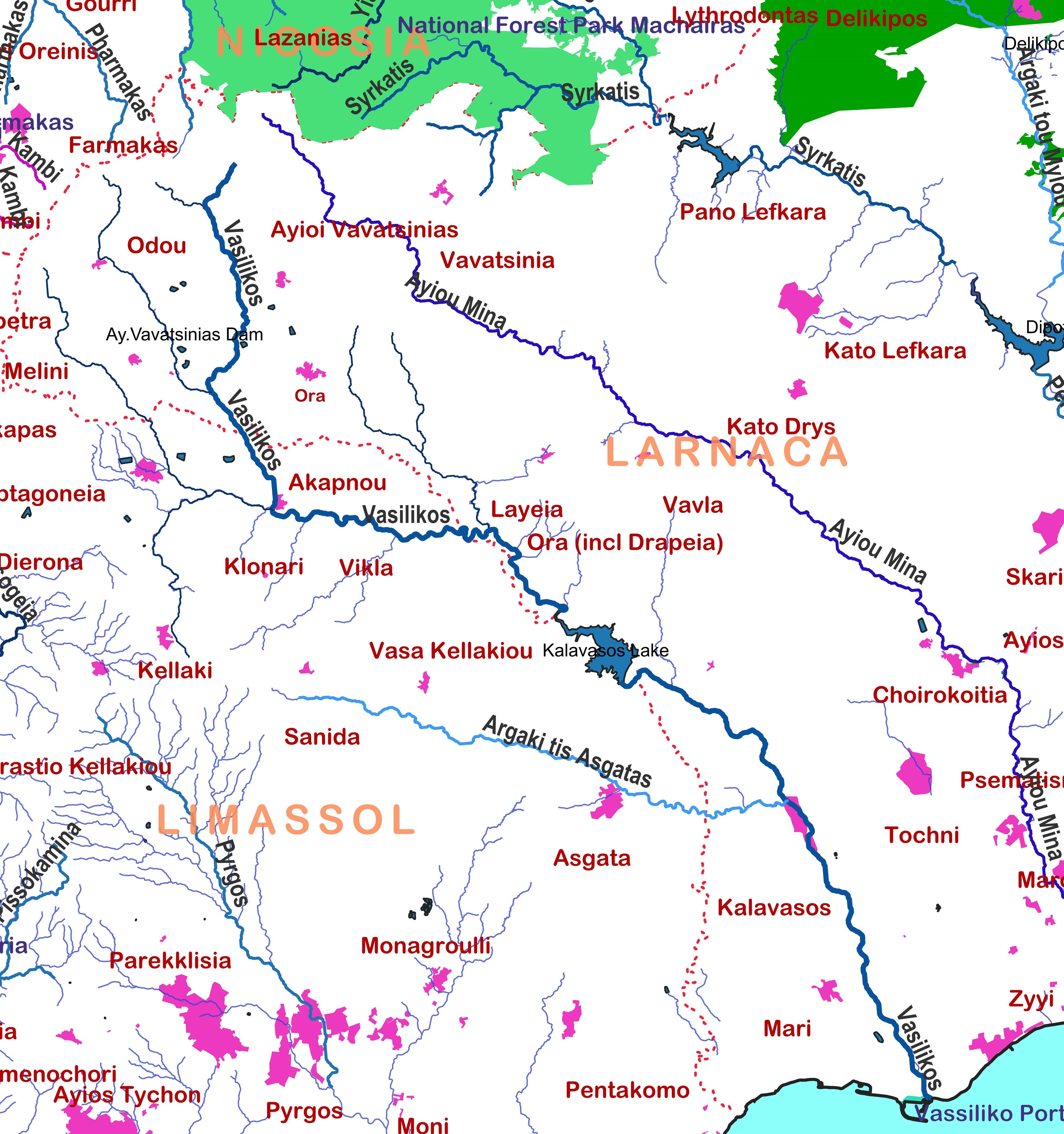
Map of the Vasilikos River

== See also ==
- List of rivers of Cyprus
