= Monagroulli =

Monagroulli Μοναγρούλλι
- Village
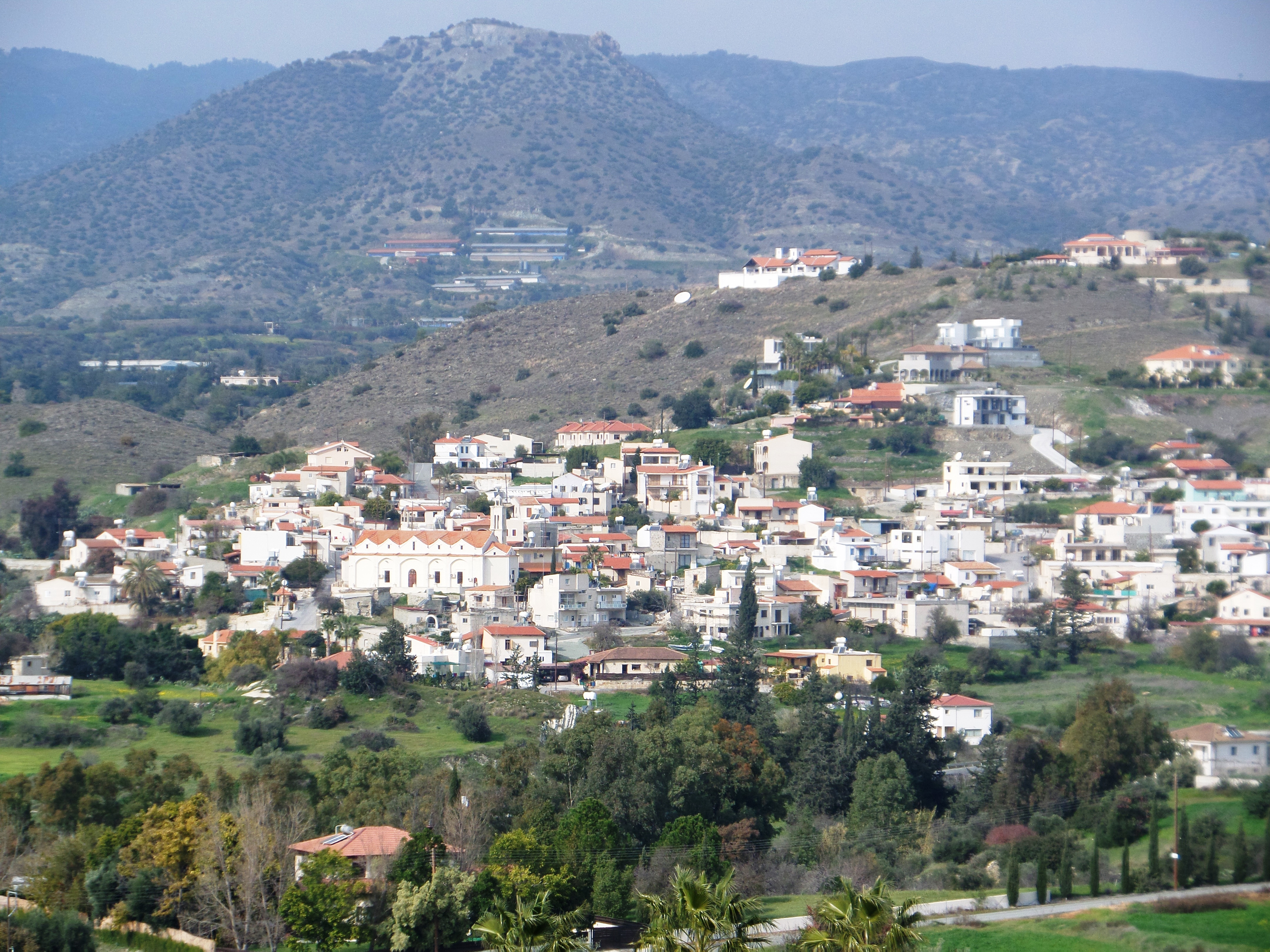

- Location in Cyprus
- Coordinates: 34°44′50″N 33°12′45″E
- Country: Cyprus
- District: Limassol District

Population (2001)
  - Total: 471
- Time zone: UTC+2 (EET)
  - Summer (DST): UTC+3 (EEST)
- Website: http://monagroulli.com.cy/

Monagroulli (Greek: Μοναγρούλλι, diminutive of Monagri) is a village in the Limassol District of Cyprus, located 3 km northeast of Moni and 6 km southwest of Asgata.
