= Sanida =

Sanida Σανίδα
- Village
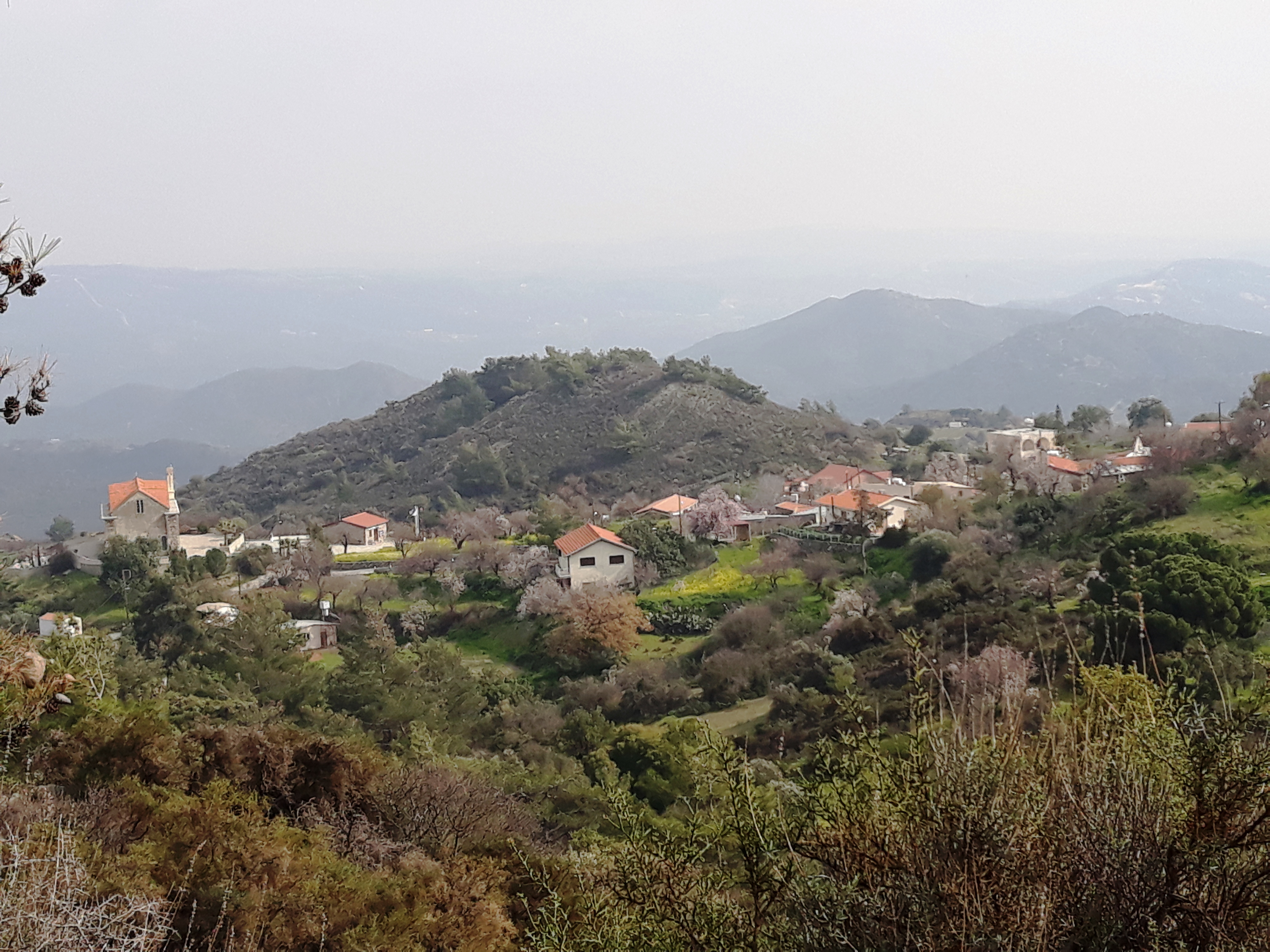

- Location in Cyprus
- Coordinates: 34°48′28″N 33°11′23″E
- Country: Cyprus
- District: Limassol District

Population (2001)
  - Total: 44
- Time zone: UTC+2 (EET)
  - Summer (DST): UTC+3 (EEST)

Sanida (Greek: Σανίδα) is a village in the Limassol District of Cyprus, located 4 km east of Kellaki.
