= Vasiliki =

Vasiliki may refer to:

- Vassiliki (given name)

== Places ==
- Vasiliki, Lasithi, a village and an archaeological site in Lasithi, Crete, Greece
- Vasiliki, Lefkada, a village on Lefkada, Greece
- Vasiliki, Trikala, a municipal unit in Trikala regional unit, Greece

== Other uses ==
- Vasiliki Ware, a type of Minoan pottery
- Vasiliki (film), a 1997 Greek film directed by Vangelis Serdaris
- Vasiliki, a song by Stamatis Spanoudakis and Yiannis Xanthoulis, originally sung by Alkistis Protopsalti
- Vasiliki Ridge, a landform in the United States

== See also ==
- Vasilisa (name), feminine Greek and East Slavic form of Basil
