= Akapnou =

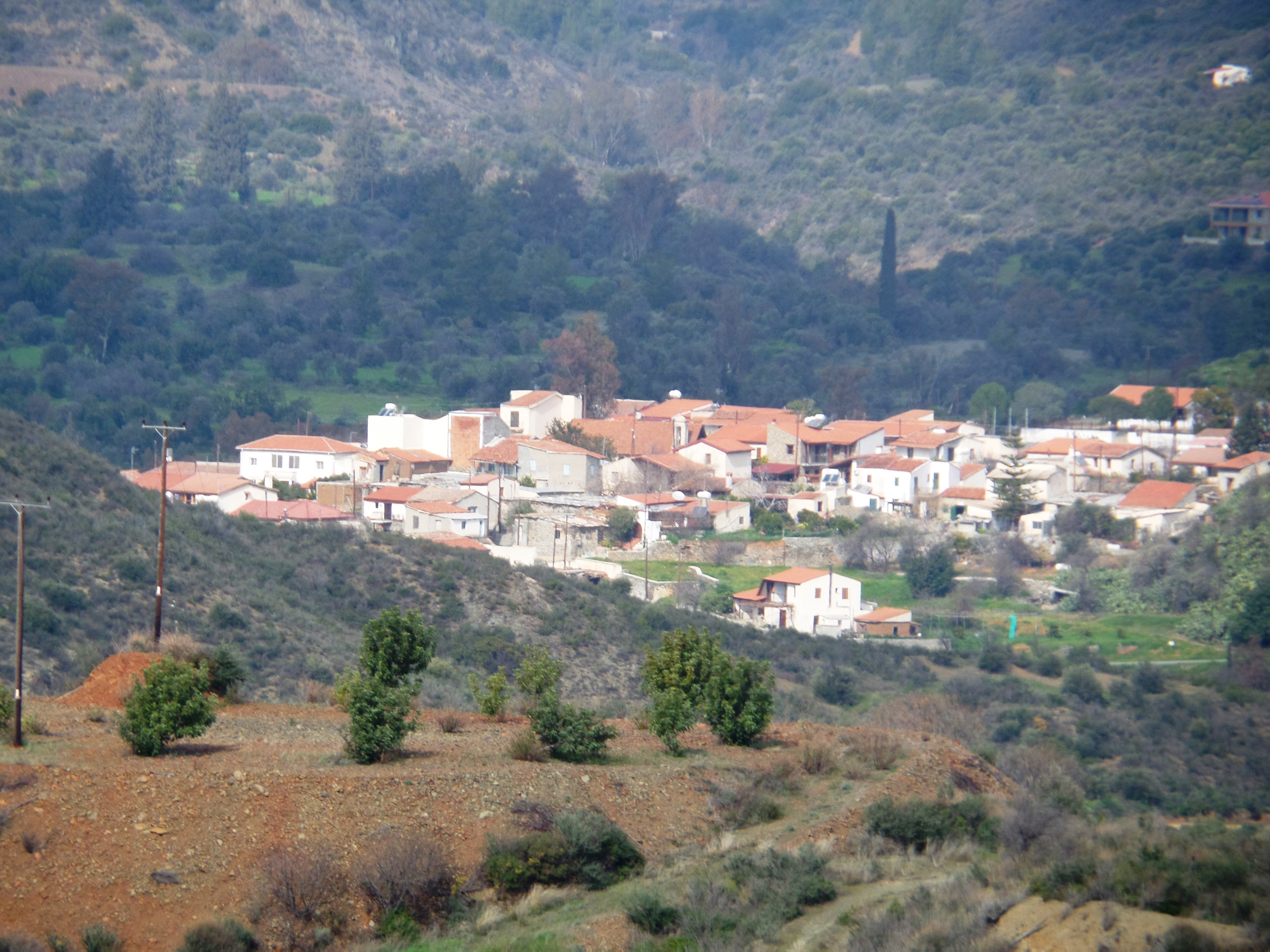

- Location within Cyprus
- Coordinates: 34°50′16″N 33°11′13″E
- Country: Cyprus
- District: Limassol District

Population (2011)
  - Total: 20

Akapnou (Greek: Ακαπνού) is a village in the Limassol District of Cyprus, located 3 kilometres (1.9 mi) east of Eptagoneia. As of 2011, it had a population of 20.

== Gallery ==
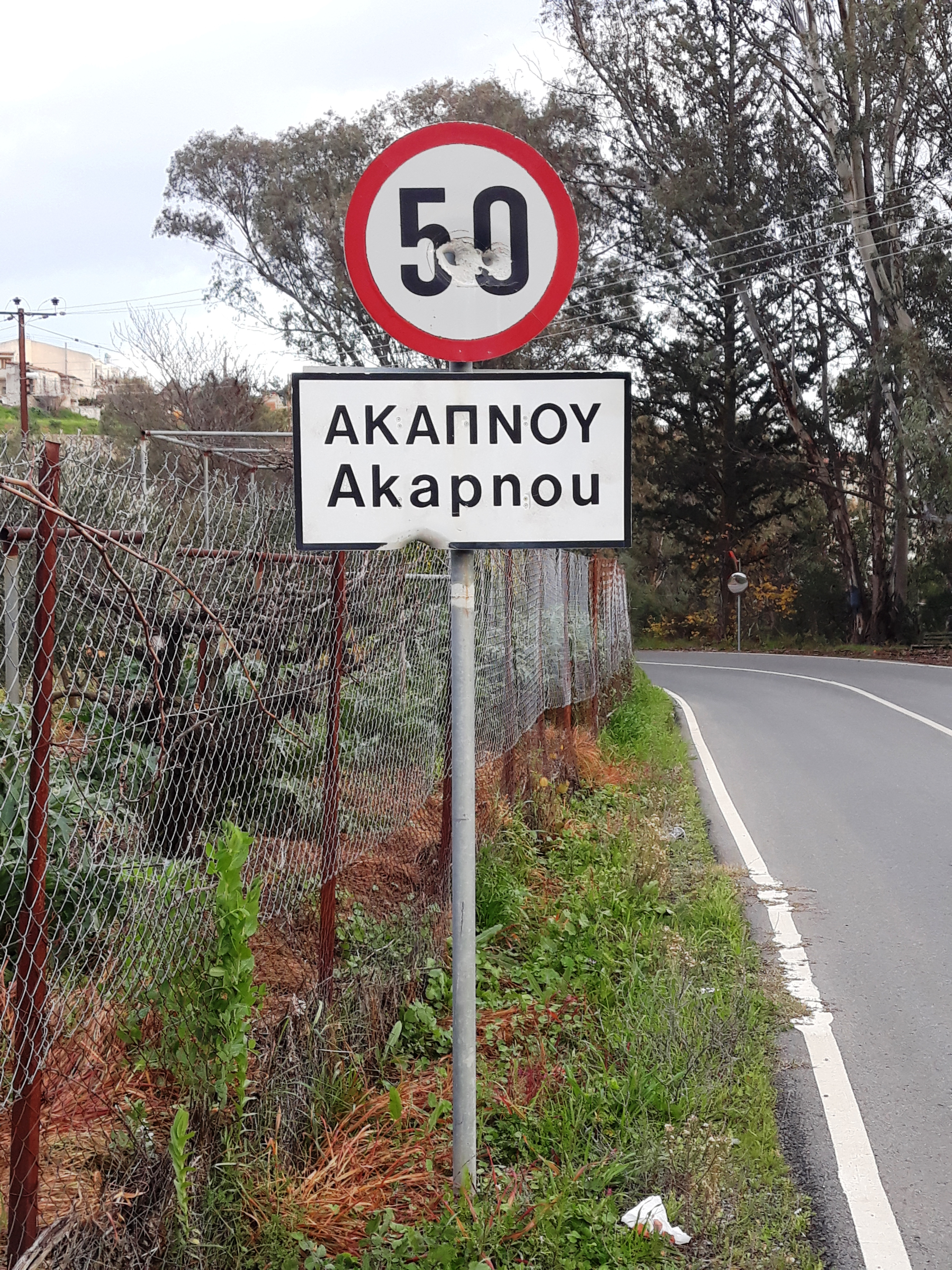

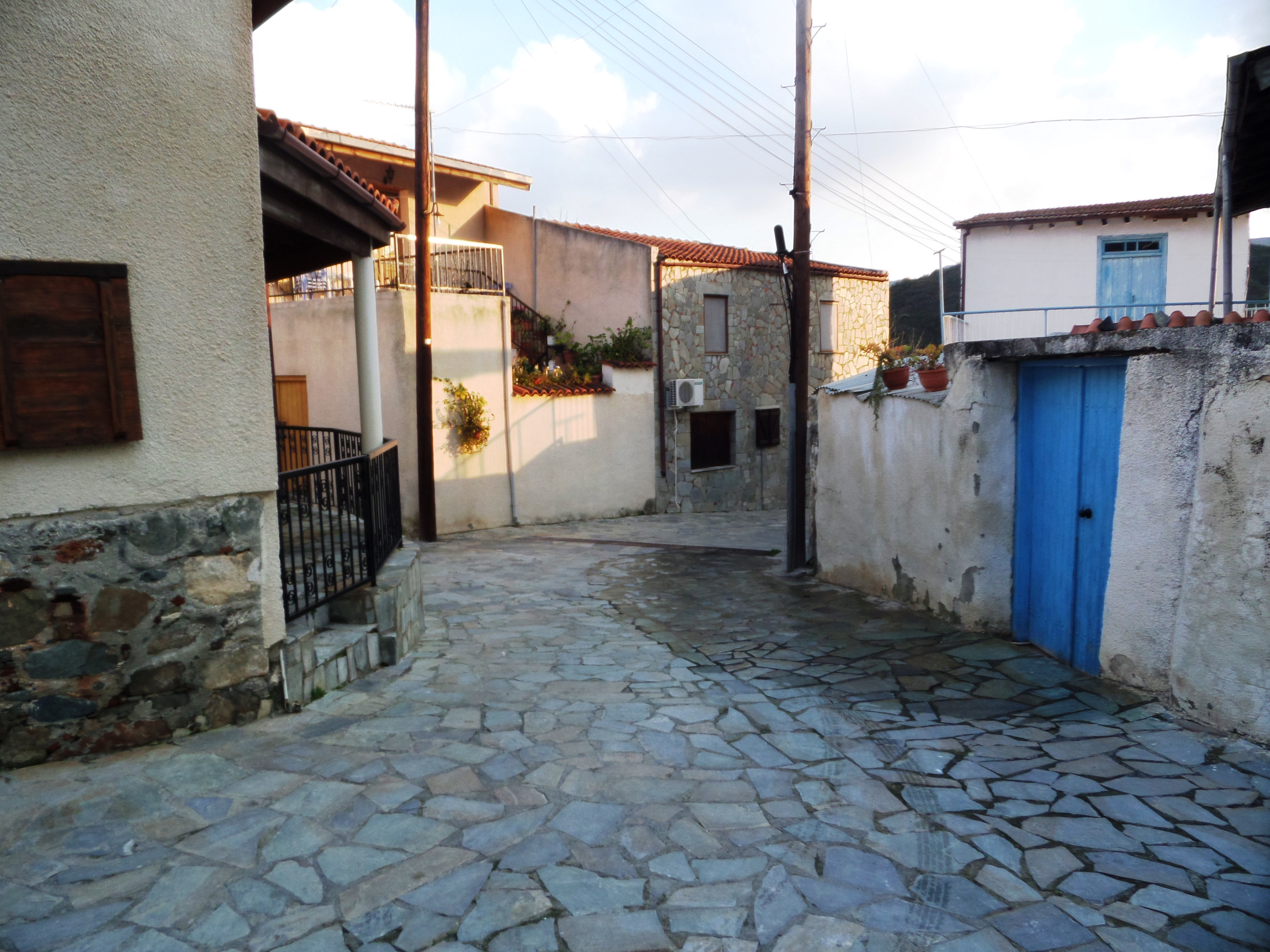

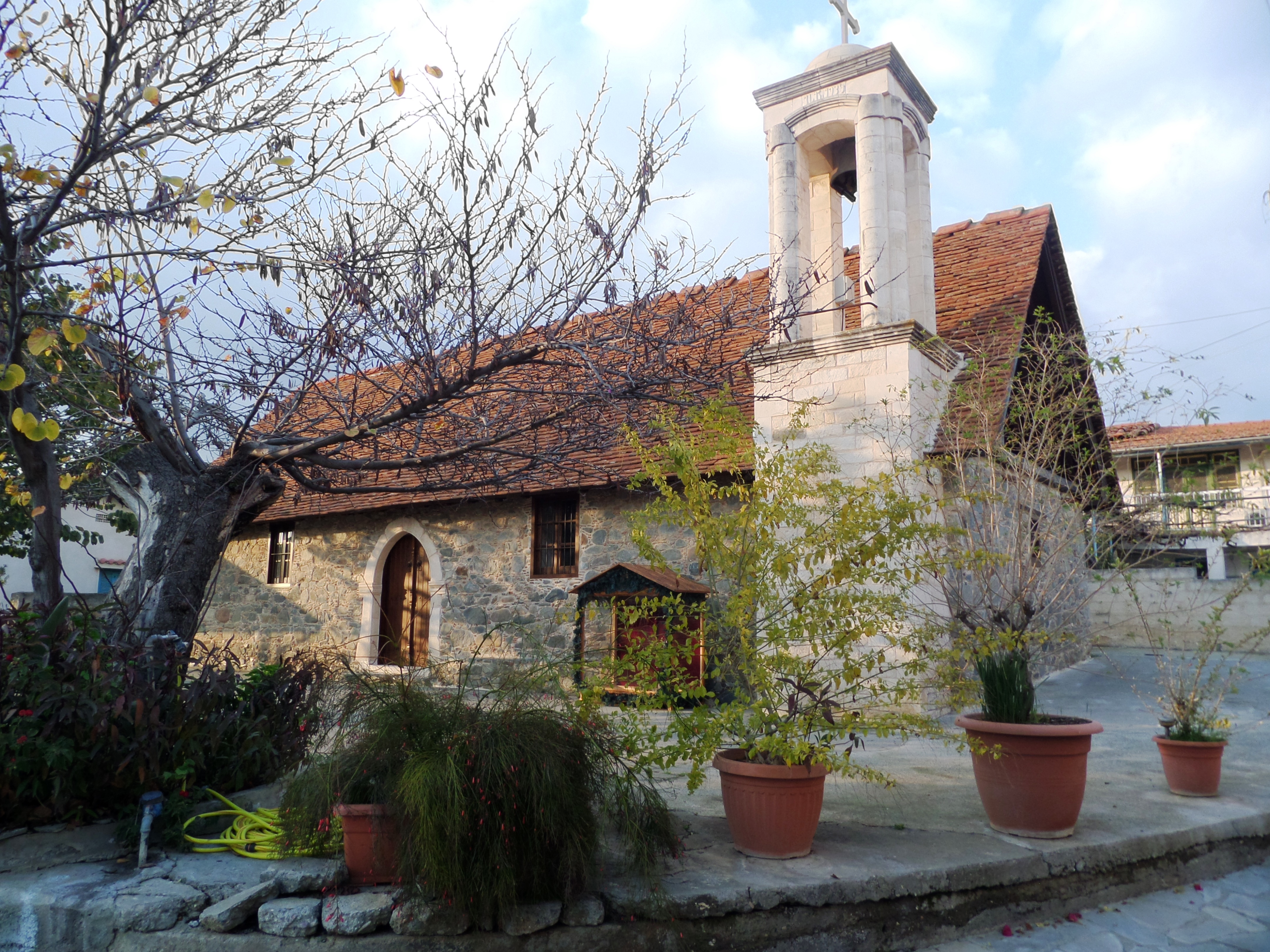

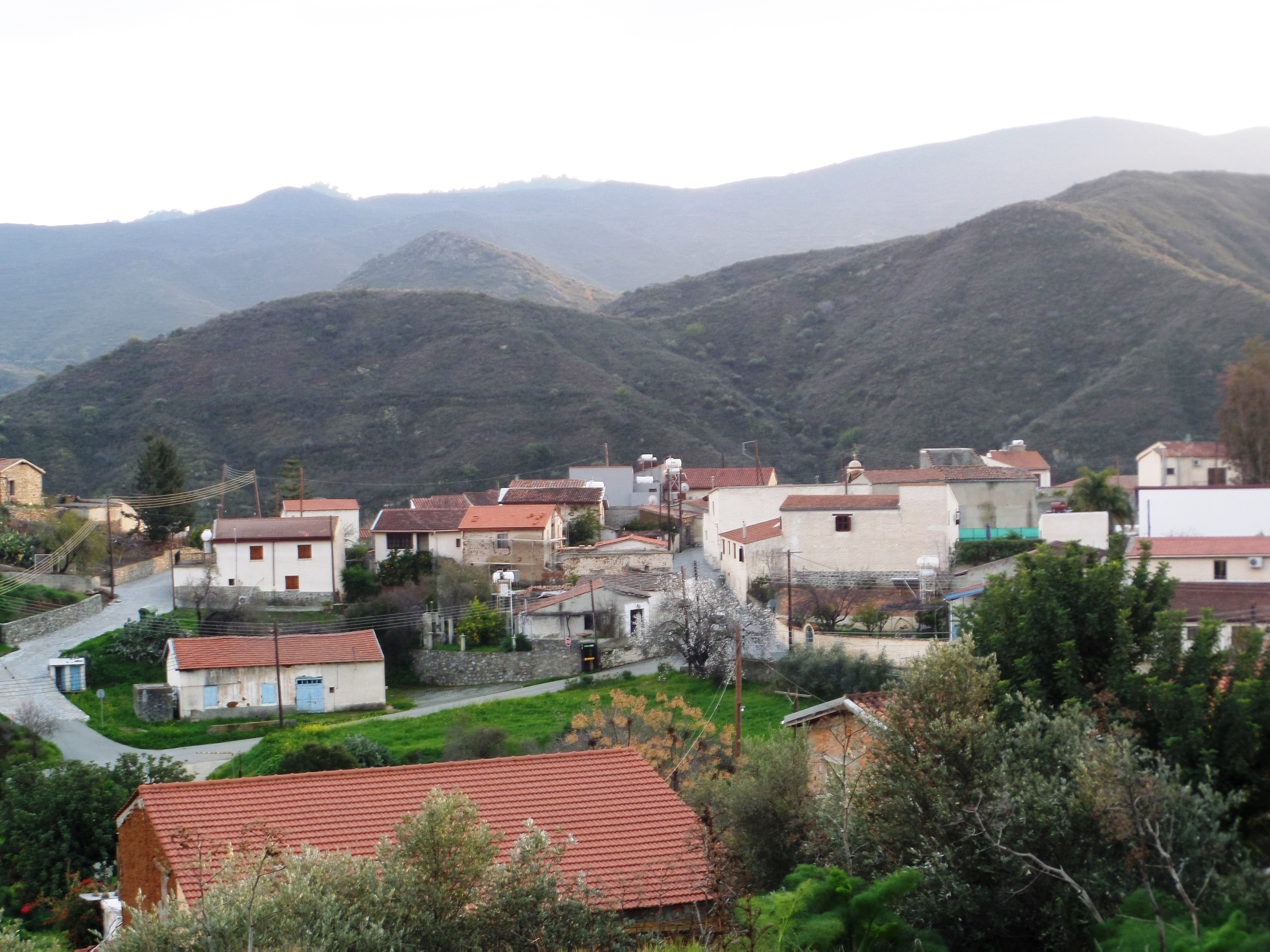
