= Zygi =

Zygi Ζύγι
- Location within Cyprus
- Coordinates: 34°44′N 33°20′E
- Country: Cyprus
- District: Larnaca District

Population (2018)
  - Total: 803
- Time zone: UTC+2 (EET)
  - Summer (DST): UTC+3 (EEST)
- Postal code: 7739
- Website: www.zygi.com

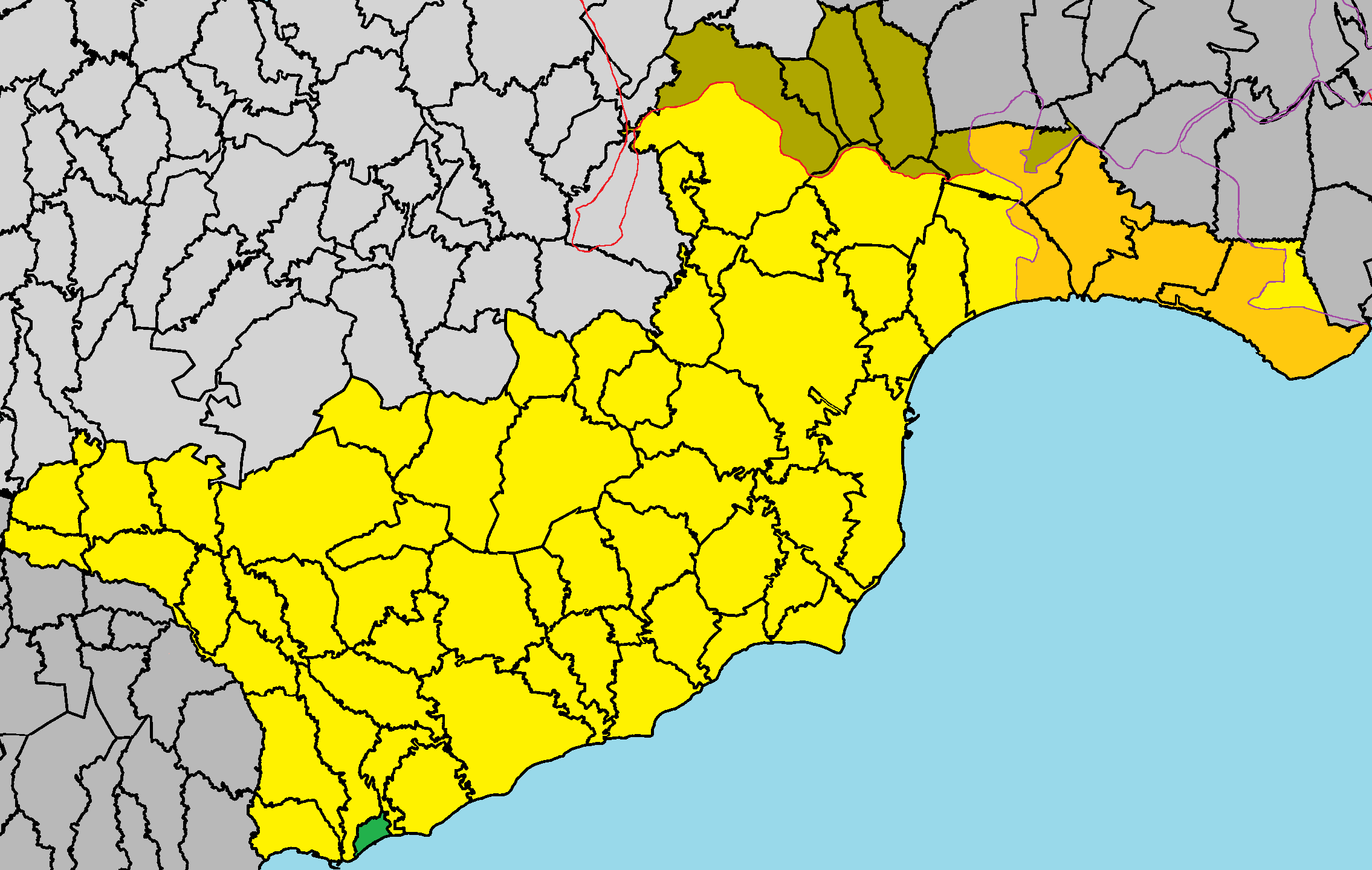
Map of Zygo in relation to Larnaca District

Zygi (Greek: Ζύγι; Turkish: Terazi) is a small village on the south coast of Cyprus, between Limassol and Larnaca. Before 1974, Zygi had a mixed Greek- and Turkish-Cypriot population.

== Explosion ==
The Evangelos Florakis Navy Base explosion of 11 July 2011 damaged every house in the village.

== Refugee centre controversy ==
In 2018, the village was the site of protests supported by anti-immigrant party ELAM and members of the local council against the building of a centre for unaccompanied refugee children. Other residents disputed the protest.

This controversy led to some Cypriots calling for a boycott of the village, which is famous for its taverns. Notably, a trip to the village by a nearby school was cancelled, after students refused to go, as they considered that their immigrant classmates would not be welcome.

== Tourism in the village ==
Thanks to the village's proximity to cities popular among tourists (about half an hour's drive from Larnaca and Limassol) and the multitude of attractions for vacationers and sailing enthusiasts, the village is a hub for bustling tourism.

The village has a fishing harbor and a marina that has recently been established.
