= Kellaki =

Kellaki Κελλάκι
- Village
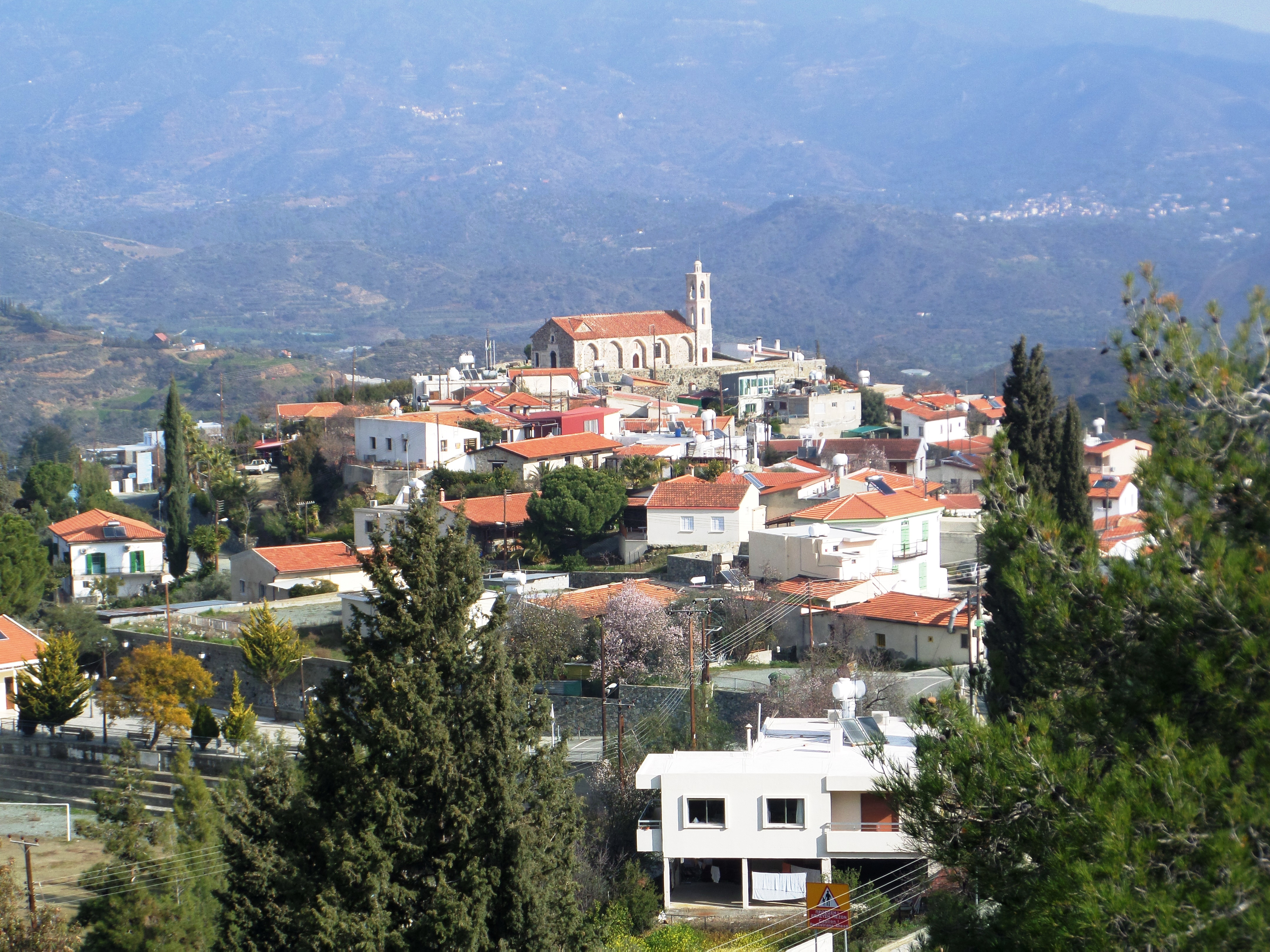

- Location in Cyprus
- Coordinates: 34°48′58″N 33°9′30″E
- Country: Cyprus
- District: Limassol District

Population (2011)
  - Total: 299
- Time zone: UTC+2 (EET)
  - Summer (DST): UTC+3 (EEST)
- Website: http://www.kellaki.com/

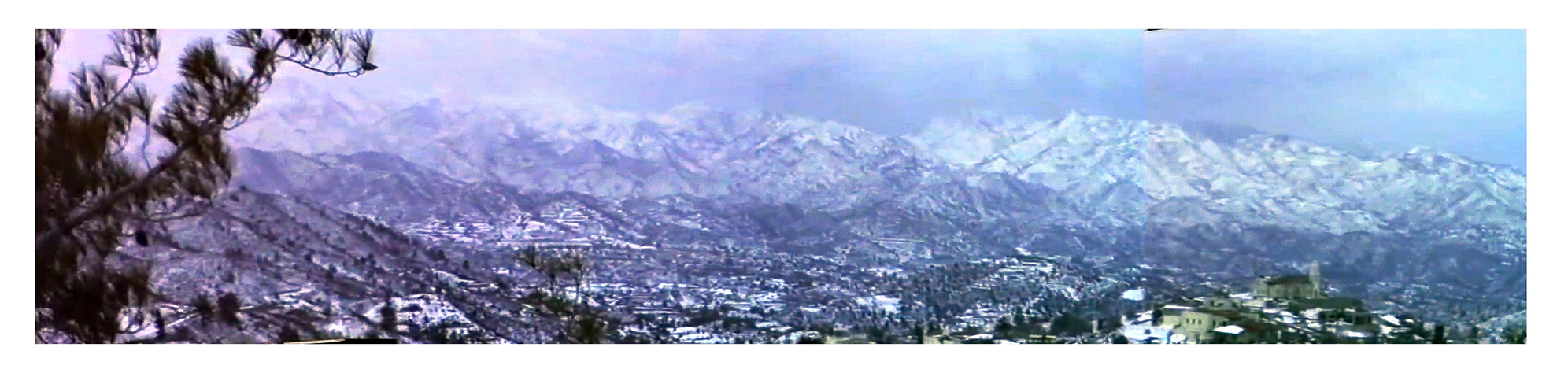
Snow-covered mountains near Kellaki.

Kellaki (Greek: Κελλάκι) is a village in the Limassol District of Cyprus, located 10 km north of Parekklisia.
