= Asgata =

Asgata Ασγάτα
- Village
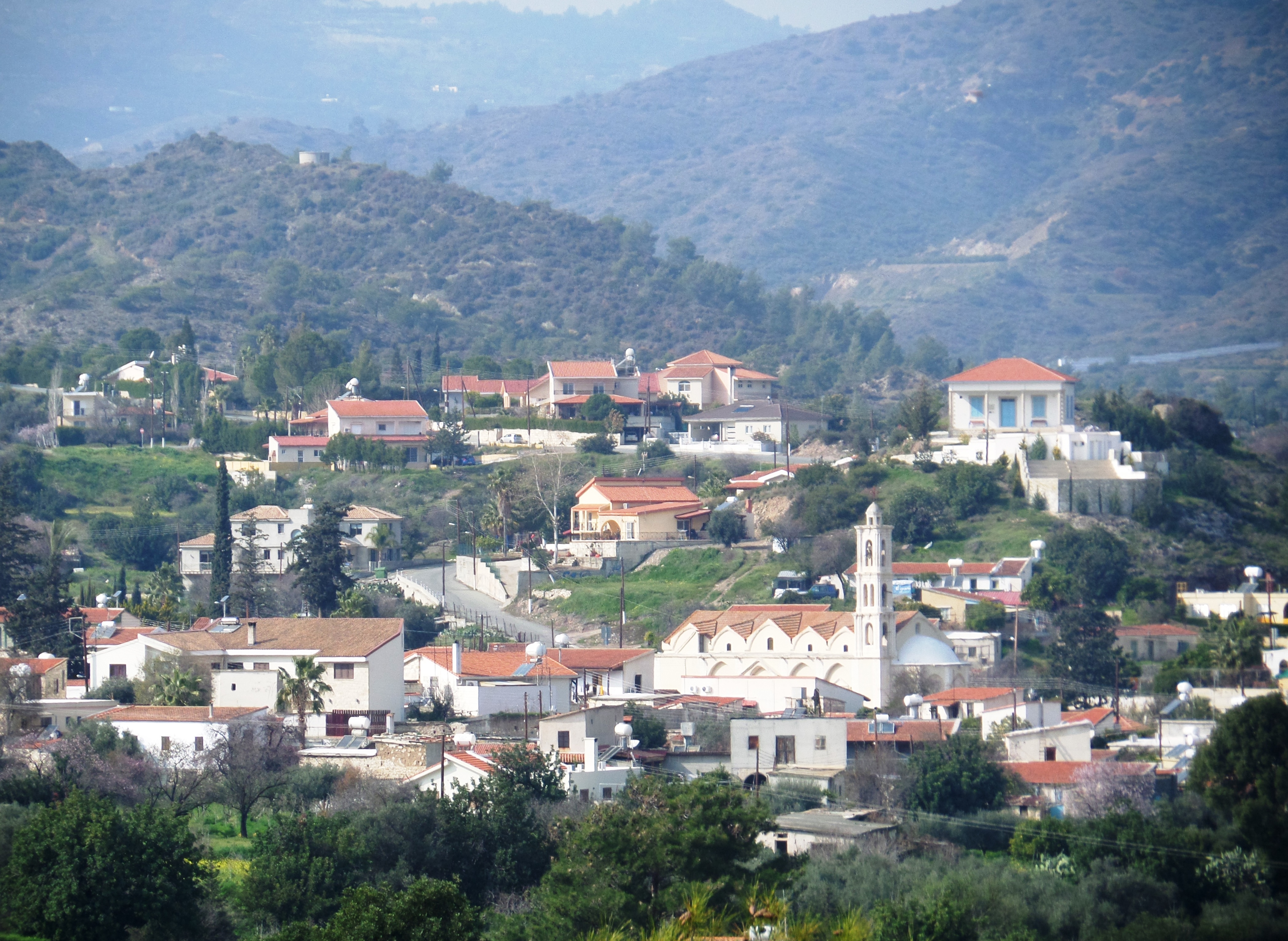

- Location in Cyprus
- Coordinates: 34°46′43″N 33°15′17″E
- Country: Cyprus
- District: Limassol District

Population (2001)
  - Total: 389
- Time zone: UTC+2 (EET)
  - Summer (DST): UTC+3 (EEST)

Asgata (Greek: Ασγάτα) is a village in the Limassol District of Cyprus, located 6 km northeast of Monagroulli. The village, is lying in the middle of a valley of 190 meters altitude and is considered the easternmost village in the Limassol district, located 26 km from the city center.

== Origin of Name ==
There are several versions regarding the origins of the village's name, but two of them seem to be the most prominent.

- Simos Menandros writes that the name is a combination between the Latin-based, medieval ending -ata (which means ownership) and Aska's - a local toponym for the biggest landlord.
- Costas Pyrrhus’ version, who was one of the biggest benefactors of the village and the president of the American Association Asgatiton, "Asgata was inhabited by the very beginning of Historic Era and long time before the Doric dialect replaced the Attic one in Cyprus. Given that, we can undoubtedly prove that Asgata’s name comes from the two following Doric words: “As” and “Gatas”; “As” in ancient Greek means “Until” and “Gatas” means “Farmer “. Thus, the theory is that ancient Asgata was inhabited by farmers who used to supply agricultural products to traders.

== Asgata Association ==
The Asgata Association was established in 1934 and is one of the oldest Cypriot associations in the United States. The association was one of the founding members of the Cyprus Federation of America. The association strives to keep the Hellenic Cypriot culture alive for Cypriot Americans and help towards a free and united Cyprus.
