= Houma West railway station =

Railway station in Houma, Shanxi, China

Houma West 侯马西站
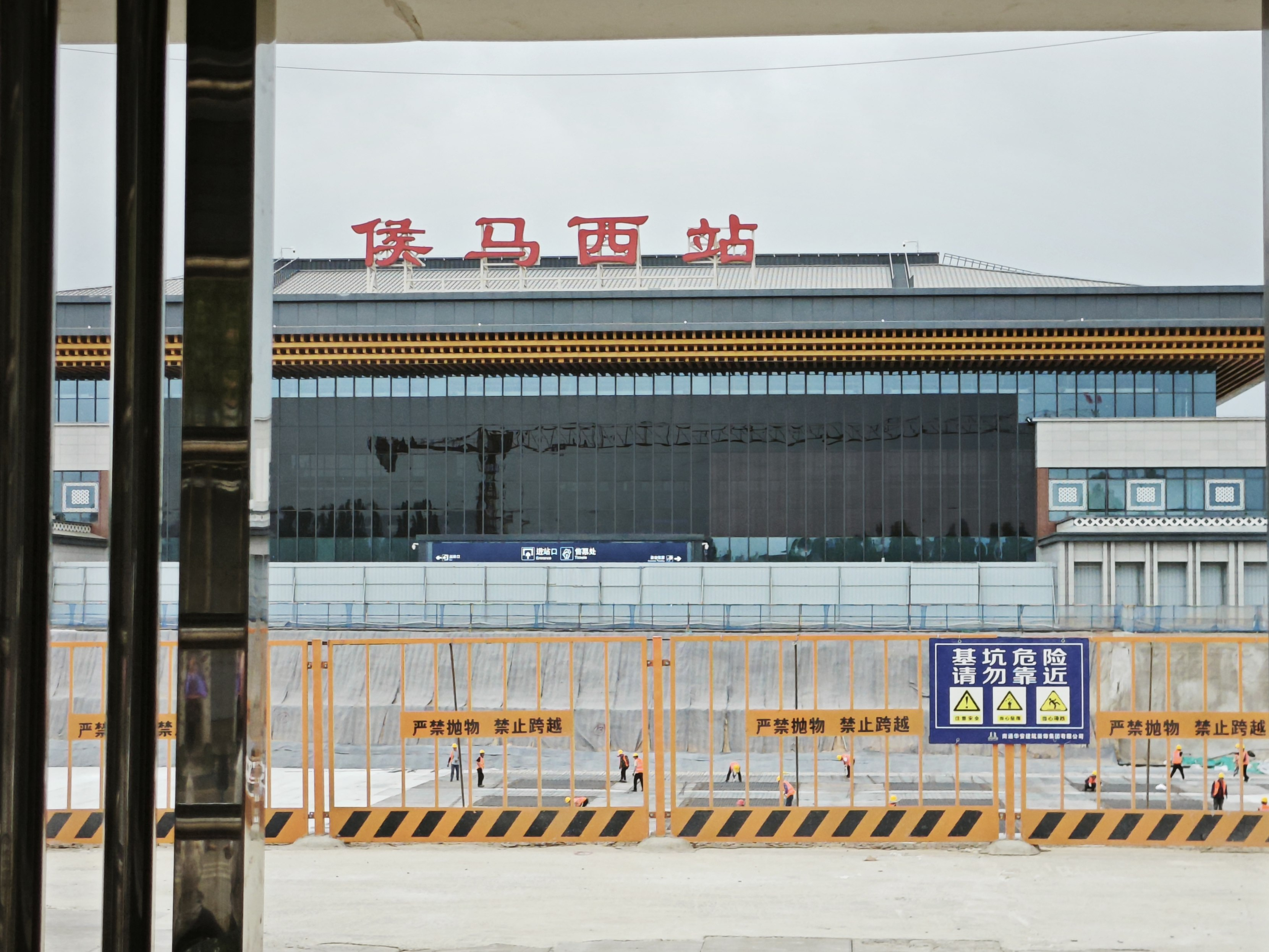

General information
- Location: Houma, Shanxi; China
- Operator: China Railway
- Line: Datong–Xi'an Passenger Railway

History
- Opened: 1 July 2014; 12 years ago
Location

Houma West railway station (Chinese: 侯马西站) is a railway station of Datong–Xi'an Passenger Railway that is located in Houma, Shanxi, China. It started operation on 1 July 2014, alongside the railway. The station was, at the time of starting operation, under the jurisdiction of the Taiyuan Railway Bureau.

Preceding station	China Railway High-speed	Following station
Xiangfen West towards Datong South	Datong–Xi'an high-speed railway	Wenxi West towards Xi'an North
