= Linfen West railway station =

Railway station in Linfen, China

Coordinates: 36.1017°N 111.4594°E

Linfen West 临汾西站
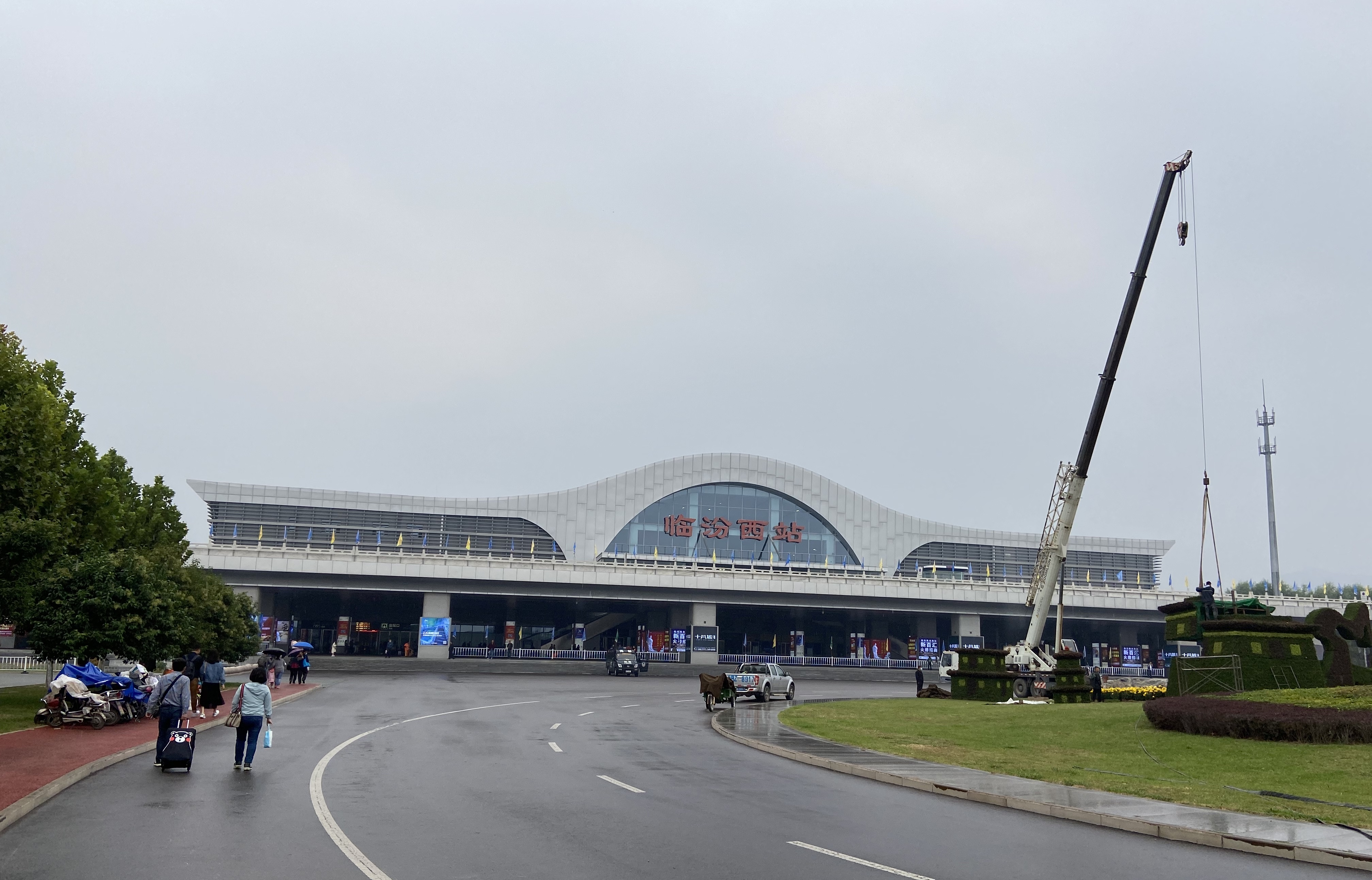
- Linfen West Railway Station

General information
- Location: Yaodu District, Linfen, Shanxi; China
- Line: Datong–Xi'an Passenger Railway
- Platforms: 2

History
- Opened: 1 July 2014; 11 years ago

Linfen West railway station (Chinese: 临汾西站; pinyin: Línfén xī zhàn) is a railway station of Datong–Xi'an Passenger Railway located in Yaodu District, Linfen, Shanxi, China. It started operation on 1 July 2014, together with the railway.

| Preceding station | China Railway High-speed | Following station |
|---|---|---|
| Hongdong West towards Datong South | Datong–Xi'an high-speed railway | Xiangfen West towards Xi'an North |
