= Jiexiu East railway station =

Railway station in Jiexiu, China

Jiexiu East 介休东站
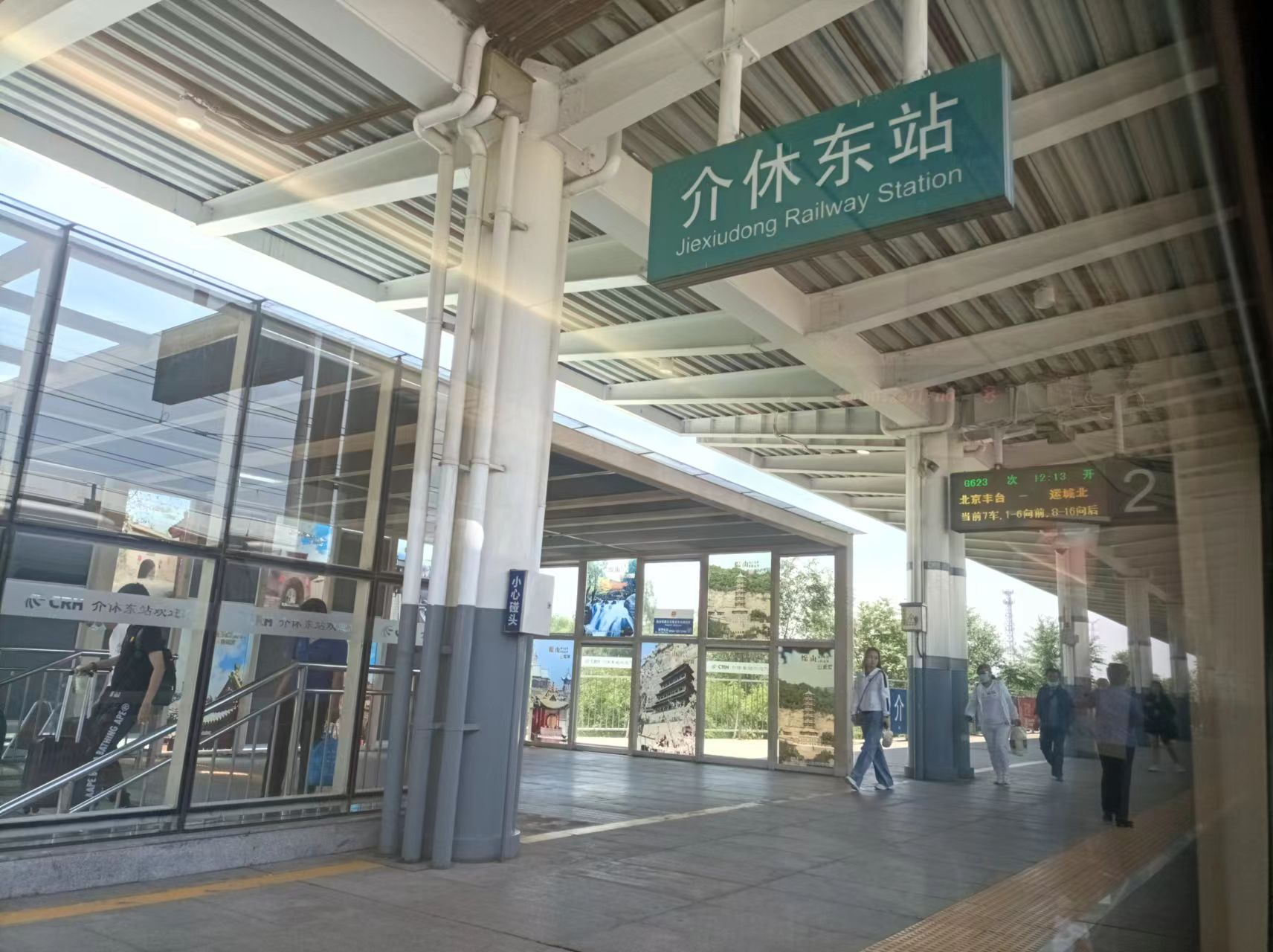
- Jiexiu East railway station platform 2

General information
- Location: Jiexiu, Shanxi; China
- Operator: China Railway
- Line: Datong–Xi'an Passenger Railway

History
- Opened: 1 July 2014; 12 years ago
Location

The Jiexiu East railway station (Chinese: 介休东站) is a railway station of Datong–Xi'an Passenger Railway that is located in Jiexiu, Shanxi, China. It started operation on 1 July 2014, along with the Railway.

Preceding station	China Railway High-speed	Following station
Pingyaogucheng towards Datong South	Datong–Xi'an high-speed railway	Lingshi East towards Xi'an North
