= Pingyaogucheng railway station =

Railway station in Jinzhong, China

Pingyaogucheng 平遥古城站
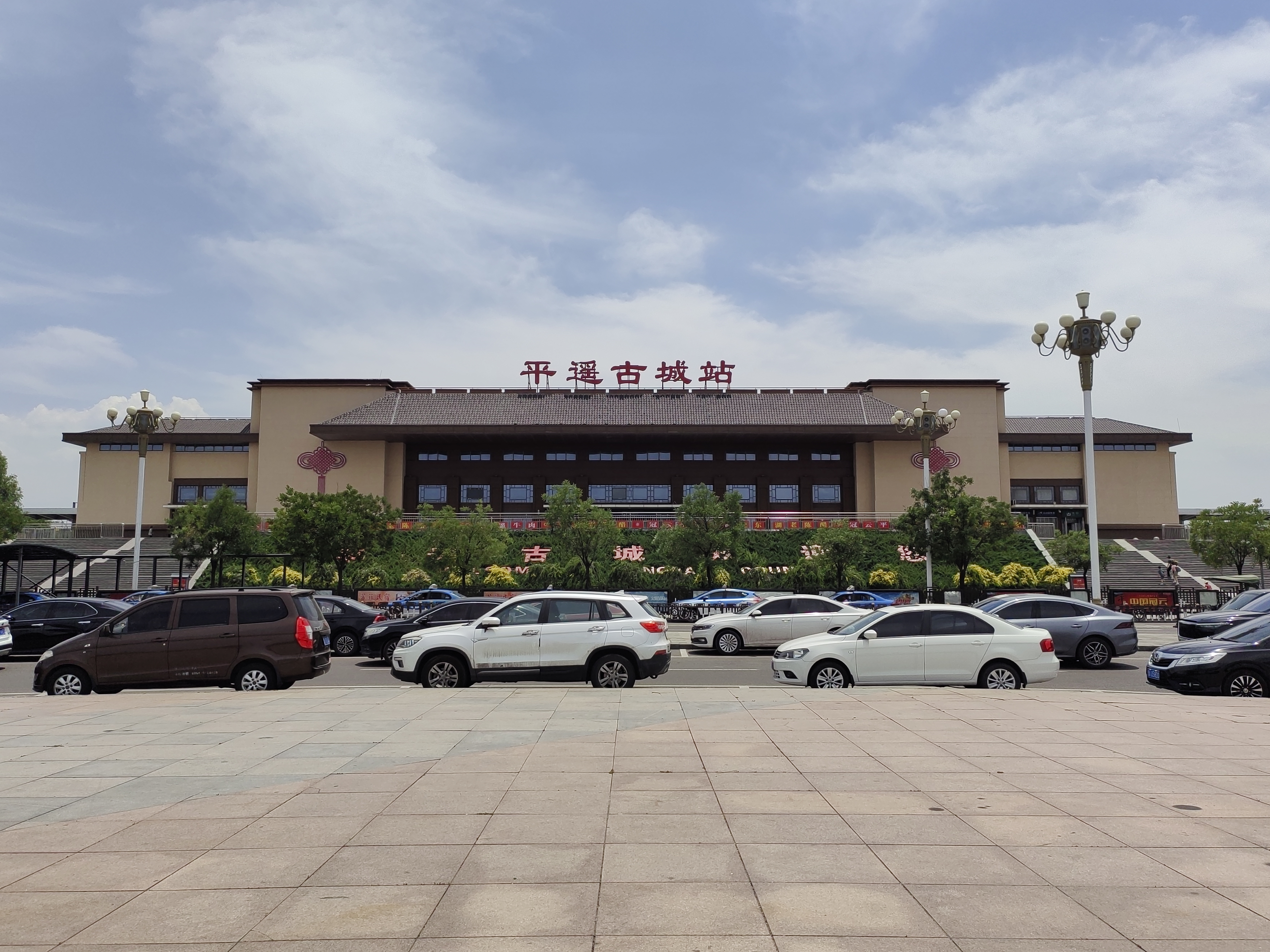

General information
- Location: Houji Village and Ducun Village, Pingyao County, Jinzhong, Shanxi; China
- Coordinates: 37°9′16.8″N 112°8′36.4″E
- Line: Datong–Xi'an Passenger Railway
- Platforms: 2 platforms
- Tracks: 4 tracks

History
- Opened: 1 July 2014; 12 years ago
- Former names: Pingyao East
Location

Pingyaogucheng railway station
- Simplified Chinese: 平遥古城站
Transcriptions
Standard Mandarin
- Hanyu Pinyin: Píngyáo gǔchéng zhàn

Pingyaogucheng railway station (Chinese: 平遥古城站; lit. 'Pingyao Ancient City railway station'), is a railway station of Datong–Xi'an Passenger Railway that is located between Houji Village and Ducun Village, Pingyao County, Jinzhong, Shanxi, China and about 8 km (5 miles) from Pingyao railway station and 10 km (6 miles) from the Pingyao Ancient City.

It started operation on 1 July 2014, together with the railway. The station was originally named Pingyao East railway station, but was renamed before it started operation.

Preceding station	China Railway High-speed	Following station
Qixian East towards Datong South	Datong–Xi'an high-speed railway	Jiexiu East towards Xi'an North
