= Lingshi East railway station =

Railway station in Shanxi, China

Lingshi East 灵石东
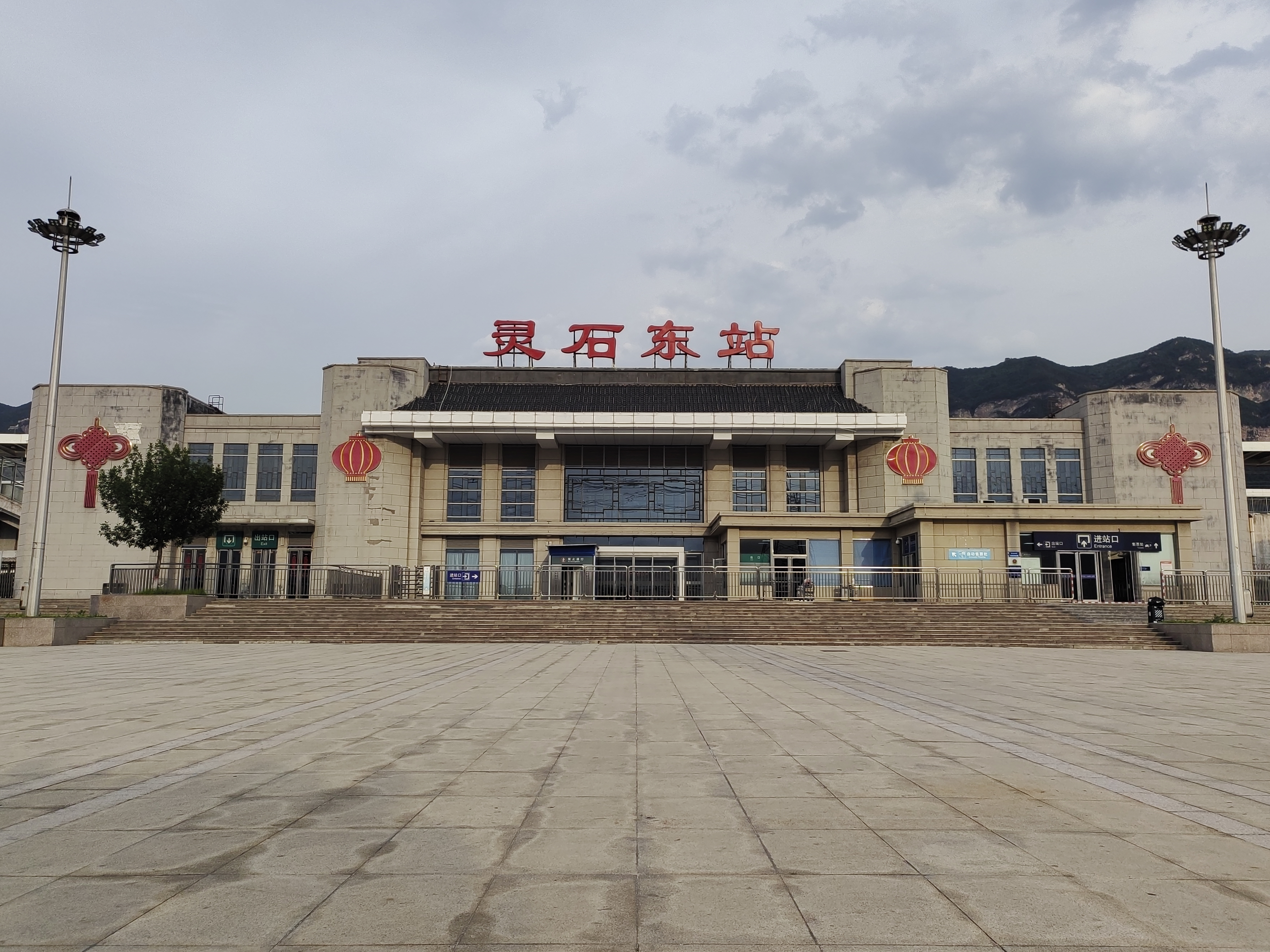
- Exterior

General information
- Location: Lingshi County, Shanxi; China
- Line: Datong–Xi'an high-speed railway
- Platforms: 2

History
- Opened: 1 July 2014; 11 years ago
Location

The Lingshi East railway station (Chinese: 灵石东站) is a railway station of Datong–Xi'an Passenger Railway that is located in Lingshi County, Shanxi, China. It started operation on 1 July 2014, together with the Railway.

Preceding station	China Railway High-speed	Following station
Jiexiu East towards Datong South	Datong–Xi'an high-speed railway	Huozhou East towards Xi'an North
