= Wenxi West railway station =

Railway station in Shanxi, China

Coordinates: 35.33663°N 111.17992°E

Wenxi West 闻喜西站

General information
- Location: Wenxi County, Shanxi; China
- Line: Datong–Xi'an high-speed railway
- Platforms: 2

History
- Opened: 1 July 2014; 12 years ago
Location

The Wenxi West railway station (Chinese: 闻喜西站) is a railway station of Datong–Xi'an high-speed railway that is located in Wenxi County, Shanxi, China. It started operation on 1 July 2014, together with the railway.

Preceding station	China Railway High-speed	Following station
Houma West towards Datong South	Datong–Xi'an high-speed railway	Yuncheng North towards Xi'an North
