= Qixian East railway station =

Railway station in Shanxi, China

Qixian East 祁县东站
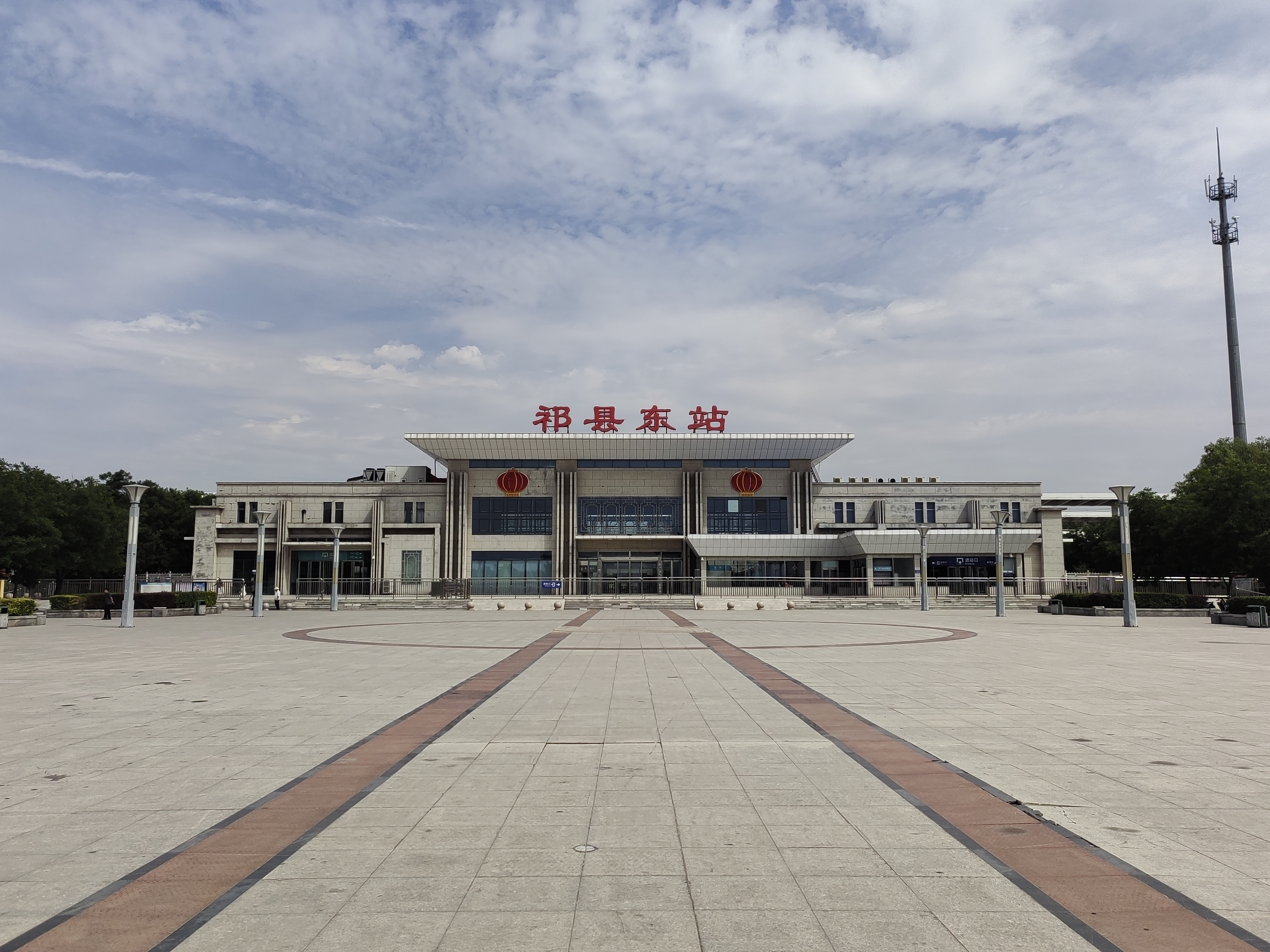

General information
- Location: Qi County, Shanxi; China
- Coordinates: 37.322877°N 112.35064°E
- Line: Datong–Xi'an Passenger Railway

History
- Opened: 1 July 2014; 12 years ago
Location
- Location within Shanxi Location within China

The Qixian East railway station (Chinese: 祁县东站) is a railway station of Datong–Xi'an Passenger Railway that is located in Qi County, Shanxi, China. It started operation on 1 July 2014, together with the railway.

Preceding station	China Railway High-speed	Following station
Taigu West towards Datong South	Datong–Xi'an high-speed railway	Pingyaogucheng towards Xi'an North
