= Xiangfen West railway station =

Railway station in Shanxi, China

Coordinates: 35.838242°N 111.330267°E

Xiangfen West 襄汾西站

General information
- Location: Xiangfen County, Shanxi; China
- Line: Datong–Xi'an Passenger Railway
- Platforms: 2

History
- Opened: 1 July 2014; 12 years ago
Location

The Xiangfen West railway station (Chinese: 襄汾西站) is a railway station of Datong–Xi'an Passenger Railway that is located in Xiangfen County, Shanxi, China. It started operation on 1 July 2014, together with the railway.

Preceding station	China Railway High-speed	Following station
Linfen West towards Datong South	Datong–Xi'an high-speed railway	Houma West towards Xi'an North
