= Huozhou East railway station =

Railway station in Huozhou, Shanxi, China

Huozhou East 霍州东站

General information
- Location: Huozhou, Shanxi; China
- Coordinates: 36.5646°N 111.8311°E
- Operator: China Railway
- Line: Datong–Xi'an Passenger Railway

History
- Opened: 1 July 2014; 12 years ago
Location

Huozhou East railway station (Chinese: 霍州东站) is a railway station of Datong–Xi'an Passenger Railway that is located in Huozhou, Shanxi, China. It started operation on 1 July 2014, together with the railway.

Preceding station	China Railway High-speed	Following station
Lingshi East towards Datong South	Datong–Xi'an high-speed railway	Hongdong West towards Xi'an North
