= Hongtong West railway station =

Railway station in Shanxi, China

Hongtong West 洪洞西站

General information
- Location: Longma Township, Hongtong County, Shanxi; China
- Operator: China Railway
- Line: Datong–Xi'an Passenger Railway

History
- Opened: 1 July 2014; 12 years ago
Location

Hongtong West railway station (Chinese: 洪洞西站) is a railway station of Datong–Xi'an Passenger Railway that is located in Hongtong County, Shanxi, China. It started operation on 1 July 2014, together with the railway.

Preceding station	China Railway High-speed	Following station
Huozhou East towards Datong South	Datong–Xi'an high-speed railway	Linfen West towards Xi'an North
