= Xigong =

Xigong is a transliteration of Mandarin Chinese that may refer to:

- Xigong District (西工), in Luoyang, Henan, China
- Ho Chi Minh City (西貢), Vietnam

== See also ==
- Sai Kung (disambiguation), areas that named after Sai Kung (Chinese: 西貢) in Hong Kong
