= Luoyang railway station =

Railway station in Luoyang, China

Luoyang 洛阳
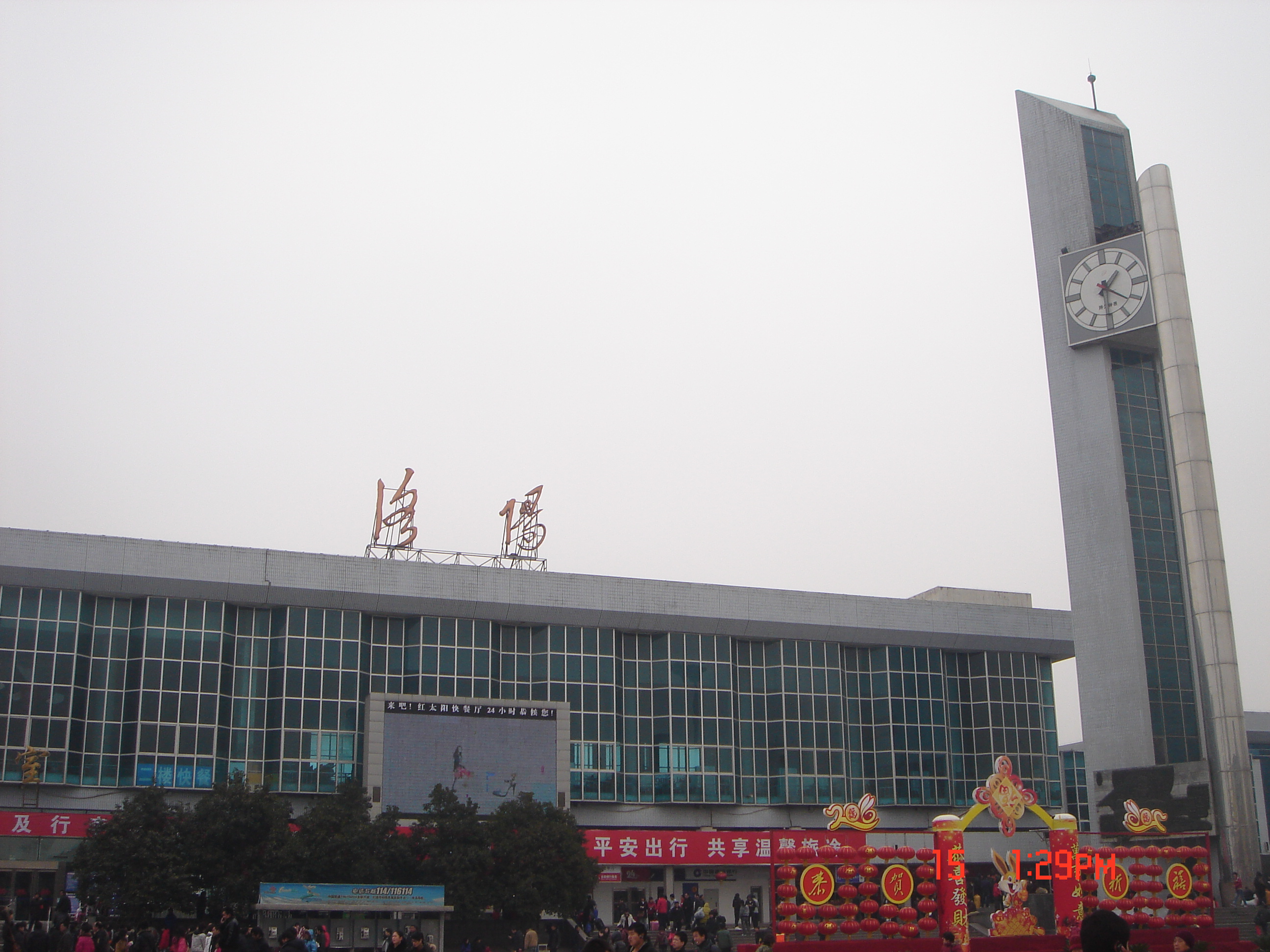

General information
- Location: 1 Daonan Road; Xigong District, Luoyang, Henan; China
- Coordinates: 34.6864°N 112.4298°E
- Operator: CR Zhengzhou
- Lines: Longhai Railway; Luoyang–Zhanjiang railway
- Platforms: 7 (1 side platform and 3 island platforms)
- Tracks: 9

Other information
- Station code: 39173 (TMIS code); LYF (telegraph code); LYA (Pinyin code)
- Classification: Class 1 station (一等站)

History
- Opened: 1912
- Former names: Jinguyuan (Chinese: 金谷园)

Services
Preceding station	China Railway	Following station
Luoyang East towards Lianyungang East	Longhai railway	Xin'anxian towards Lanzhou
Location
- Location within Henan Location within China

Luoyang railway station (simplified Chinese: 洛阳站; traditional Chinese: 洛陽站; pinyin: Luòyáng Zhàn) is a station on Longhai railway in Luoyang, Henan.

== History ==
The station was opened in 1912 as Jinguyuan railway station (Chinese: 金谷园站) on Luoyang-Tongguan railway, which commenced construction in 1910.

The station was expanded during 1957-1958 and was renamed to its current name on 1 January 1959.

The current station building was finished and opened in 1992, together with a 63 metres (207 ft) high clock tower. The station was renovated in 2009 for the China 2009 World Stamp Exhibition.

== Metro Station ==
Line 2 of the Luoyang Subway opened on 26 December 2021.

== See also ==
- Luoyang Longmen railway station
