= Luoyang Subway =

Metro system in Luoyang, Henan, China

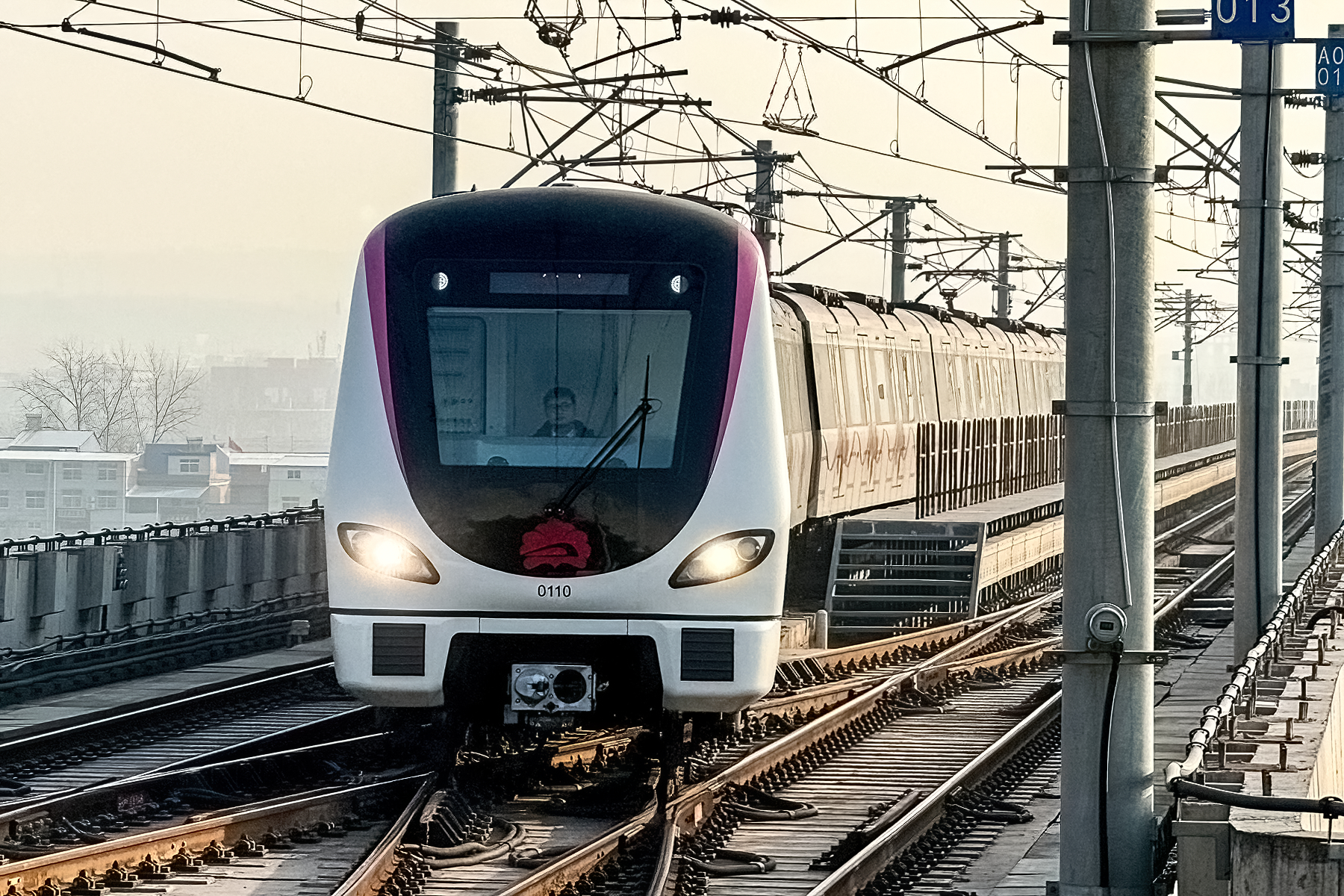
- A Line 1 train

Overview
- Owner: Luoyang Municipal People's Government
- Locale: Luoyang, Henan Province, China
- Transit type: Rapid transit
- Number of lines: 2
- Line number: Line 1 (East-West Line), Line 2 (North-South Line)
- Number of stations: 33
- Daily ridership: 515,000 (Max 31.12.2023)
- Annual ridership: 57.4 Million (2023)
- Website: www.lysubway.com.cn

Operation
- Began operation: 28 March 2021; 5 years ago
- Operators: Luoyang Subway Co., Ltd.
- Rolling stock: CRRC ZhuZhou Type-B Trains
- Number of vehicles: Line 1: 120 cars; 20 trains. Line 2: Unknown
- Train length: 6 coaches
- Headway: Line 1: Normal hours: 8-10 Min; Rush Hours: Possibly 4-6 Min Line 2: Normal hours: 7-10 Min; Rush Hours: Possibly 5-7 Min

Technical
- System length: 43.5 km
- Track gauge: 1,435 mm (4 ft 8 1/2 in) (standard gauge)
- Average speed: 60km/h
- Top speed: 80km/h
System map
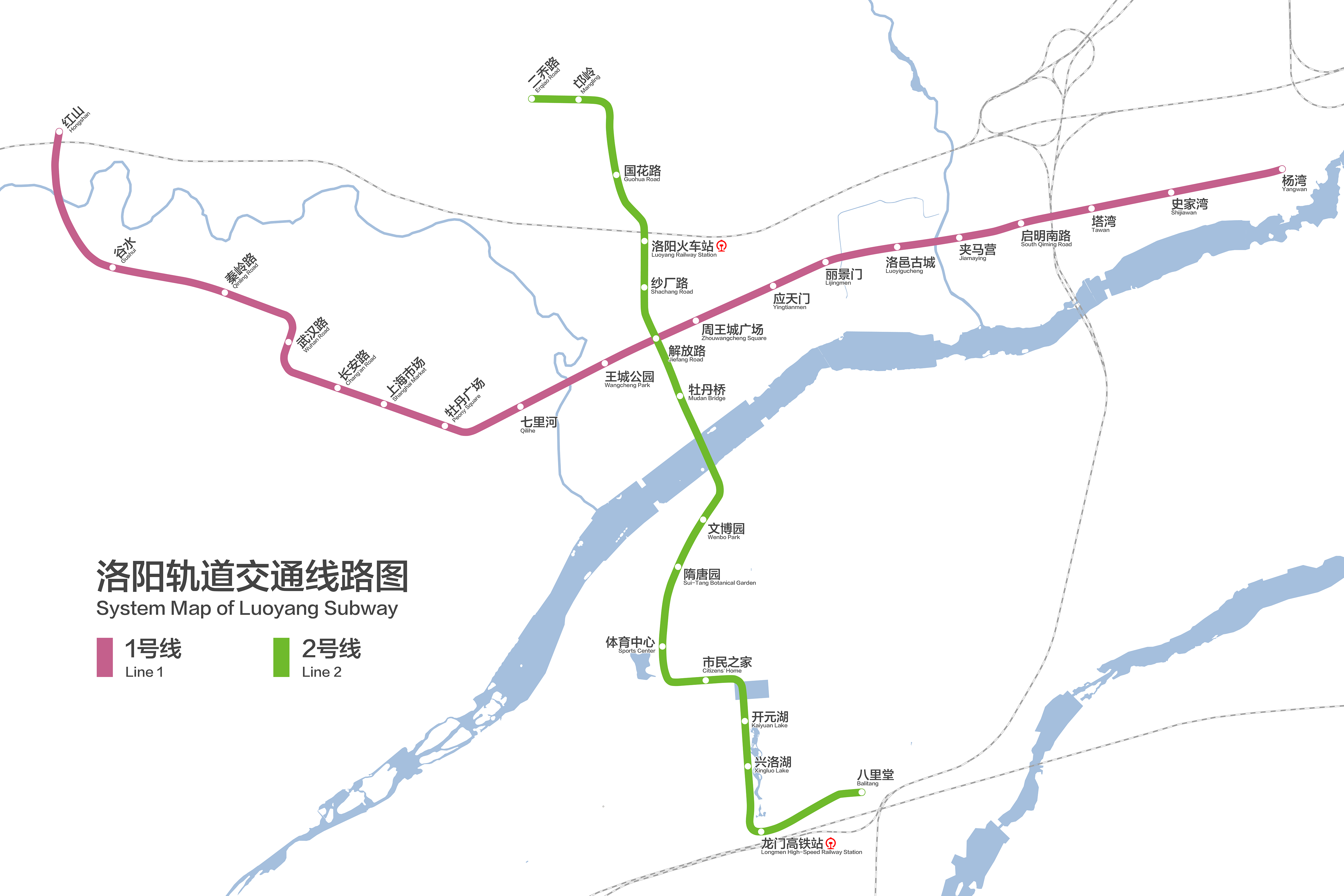

Luoyang Subway
- Traditional Chinese: 洛陽地鐵
- Simplified Chinese: 洛阳地铁
Transcriptions
Standard Mandarin
- Hanyu Pinyin: Luòyáng Dìtiě

Luoyang Subway (Chinese: 洛阳地铁; pinyin: Luòyáng Dìtiě) is a metro network serving urban and suburban districts of Luoyang. It is the second metro system in Henan Province, as well as the first metro system in a city that is not a provincial capital in central and western China.

== Lines ==
Line	Terminals (District)		Commencement	Length km	Stations
1	Hongshan (Xigong)	Yangwan (Luolong)	28 March 2021	25.342	19
2	Erqiao Road (Laocheng)	Balitang (Luolong)	26 December 2021	18.216	15

=== Line 1 ===
Line 1 is an east-west line from Yangwan station to Hongshan station. It began construction in June 2017. It was opened on 28 March 2021. Line 1 is 25.3 kilometres (15.7 mi) in length with 19 stations.

=== Line 2 ===
Line 2 is a north–south line from Erqiao Road station to Balitang station. It began construction in December 2017. It connects both Luoyang railway station and Luoyang Longmen railway station. The first phase of Line 2 is 18.216 kilometres (11.319 mi) in length with 15 stations. The line opened on 26 December 2021.

== History ==
The first phase of the system, including Line 1 and the first phase of Line 2, was approved by the National Development and Reform Commission in August 2016.

Construction of Line 1 started on 28 June 2017, and Line 2 on 26 December 2017.
