= Line 1 (Luoyang Subway) =

Line of the Luoyang Subway

- 1
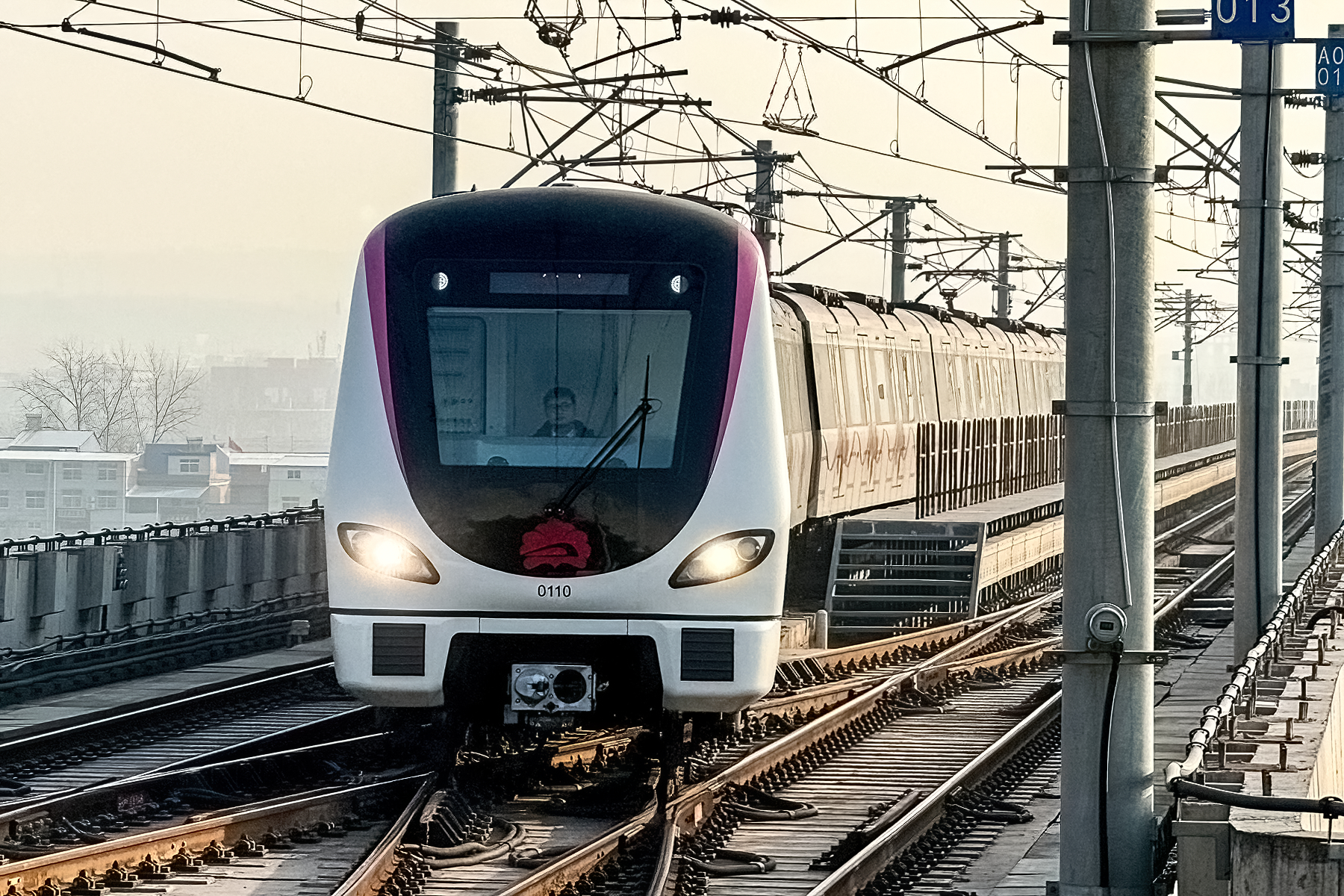
- A train of Luoyang Subway Line 1

Overview
- Status: Operational
- Locale: Luoyang, Henan, China
- Termini: Hongshan; Yangwan
- Stations: 19

Service
- Type: Rapid transit
- System: Luoyang Subway
- Operator(s): Luoyang Subway Co., Ltd.

History
- Opened: 28 March 2021; 3 years ago

Technical
- Line length: 25.342 km (15.75 mi)
- Number of tracks: 2
- Track gauge: 1,435 mm (4 ft 8 1/2 in)
Route map
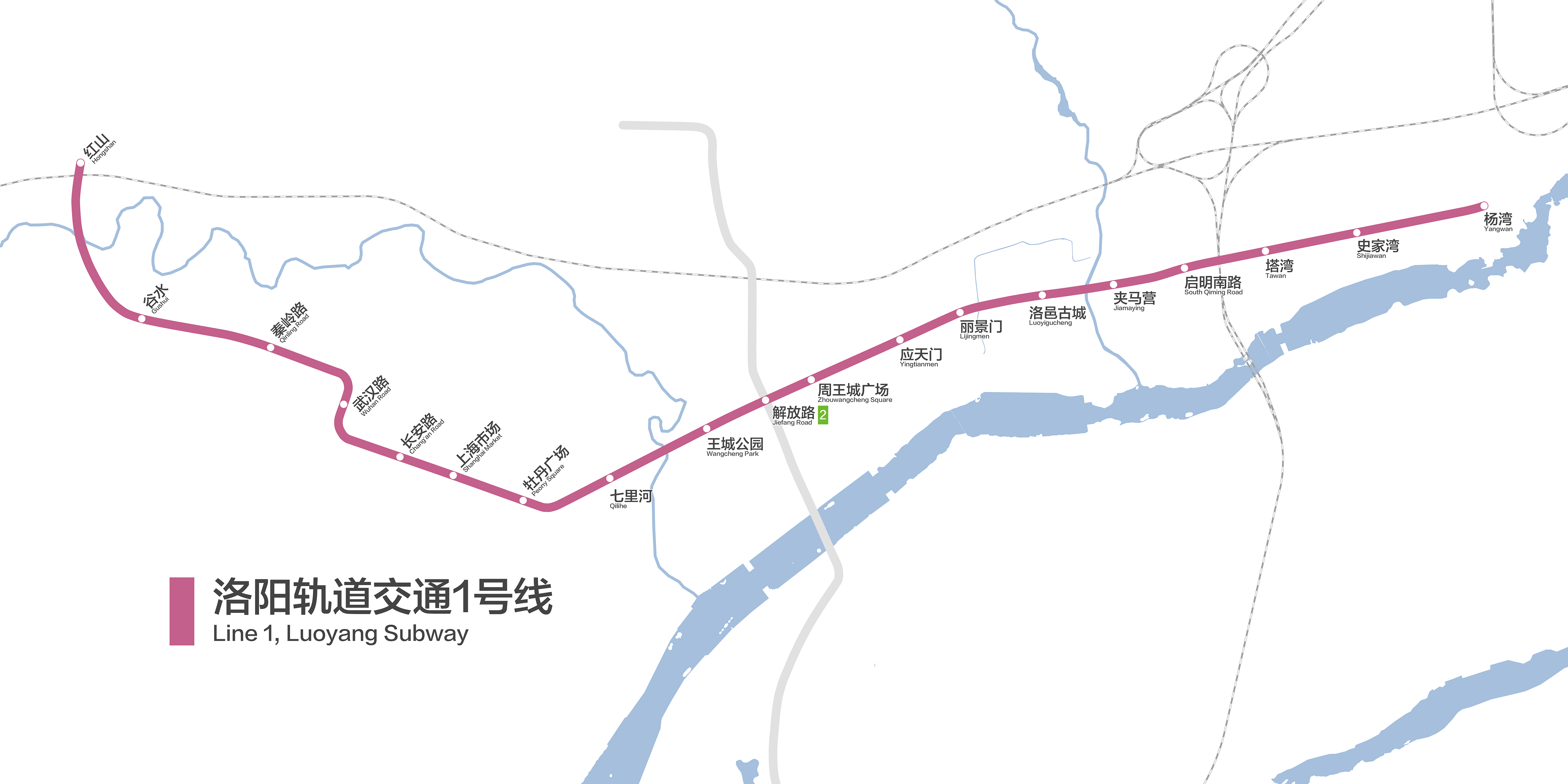

Line 1 of Luoyang Subway (Chinese: 洛阳轨道交通1号线) is the first metro line to open in Luoyang, Henan, China, which opened on 28 March 2021. The line is currently 25.342 km long with 19 stations.

== Opening timeline ==
Segment	Commencement	Length	Station(s)	Name
Hongshan — Yangwan	28 March 2021	25.342 km (15.75 mi)	19	Phase 1

== Stations ==
Station name		Connections	Distance km		Location
English	Chinese	Connections	Distance km		Location
Hongshan	红山		-	0	Xigong
Gushui	谷水				Jianxi
Qinling Road	秦岭路				Jianxi
Wuhan Road	武汉路				Jianxi
Chang'an Road	长安路				Jianxi
Shanghai Market	上海市场				Jianxi
Peony Square	牡丹广场				Jianxi
Qilihe	七里河				Jianxi
Wangcheng Park	王城公园				Xigong
Jiefang Road	解放路	2			Xigong
Zhouwangcheng Square	周王城广场				Xigong
Yingtianmen	应天门				Xigong
Lijingmen	丽景门				Laocheng
Luoyigucheng (Note: Was Qingniangong until 4 March 2024)	洛邑古城				Laocheng
Jiamaying	夹马营				Chanhe Hui
South Qiming Road	启明南路				Chanhe Hui
Tawan	塔湾				Chanhe Hui
Shijiawan	史家湾				Chanhe Hui
Yangwan	杨湾				Luolong
