= Line 2 (Luoyang Subway) =

Line of the Luoyang Subway

- 2
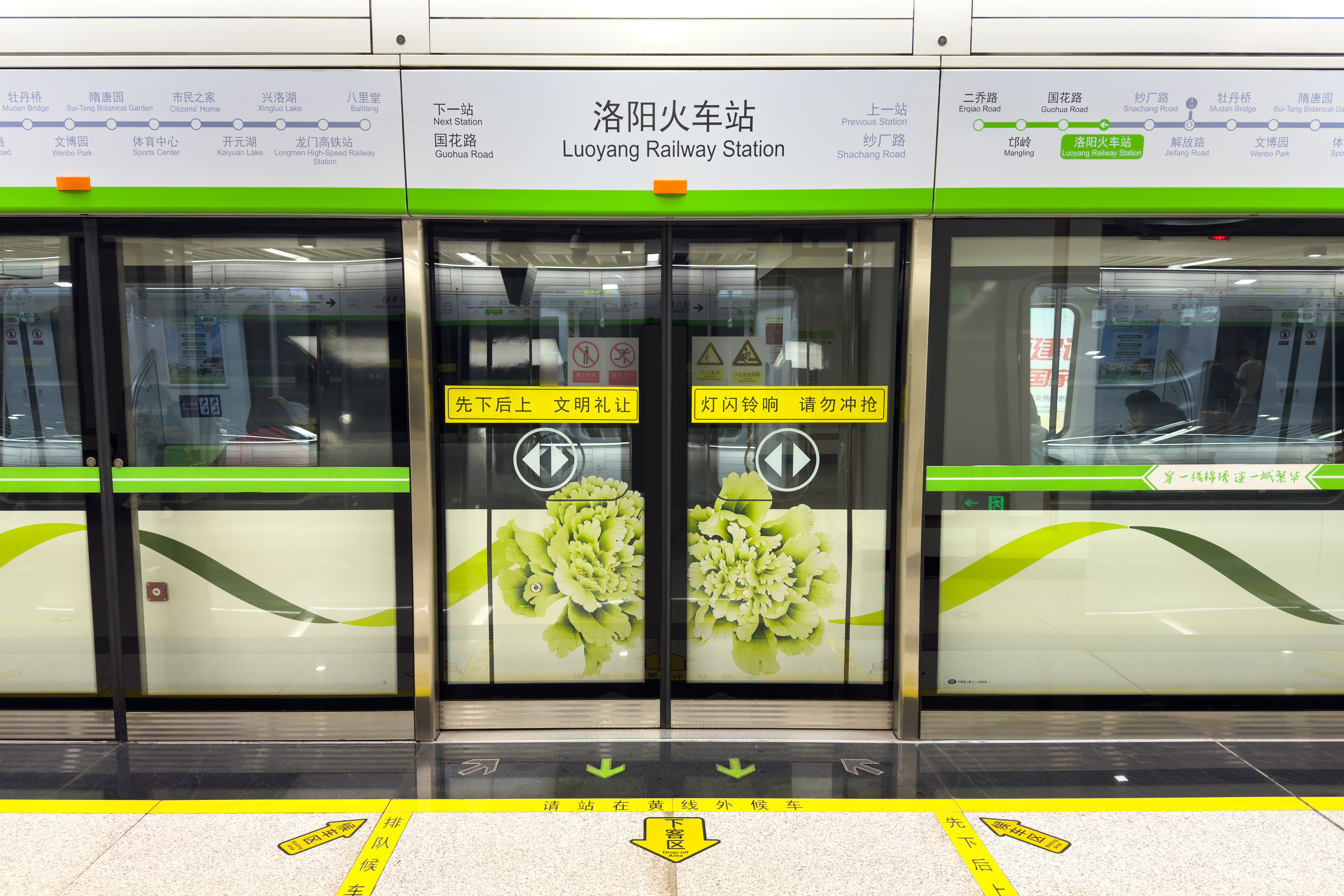
- Line 2 train stops at Luoyang railway station

Overview
- Status: Operational
- Locale: Luoyang, Henan, China
- Termini: Erqiao Road; Balitang
- Stations: 15

Service
- Type: Rapid transit
- System: Luoyang Subway
- Operator(s): Luoyang Subway Co., Ltd.

History
- Opened: 26 December 2021; 3 years ago

Technical
- Line length: 18.216 km (11.32 mi)
- Number of tracks: 2
- Track gauge: 1,435 mm (4 ft 8 1/2 in)
Route map
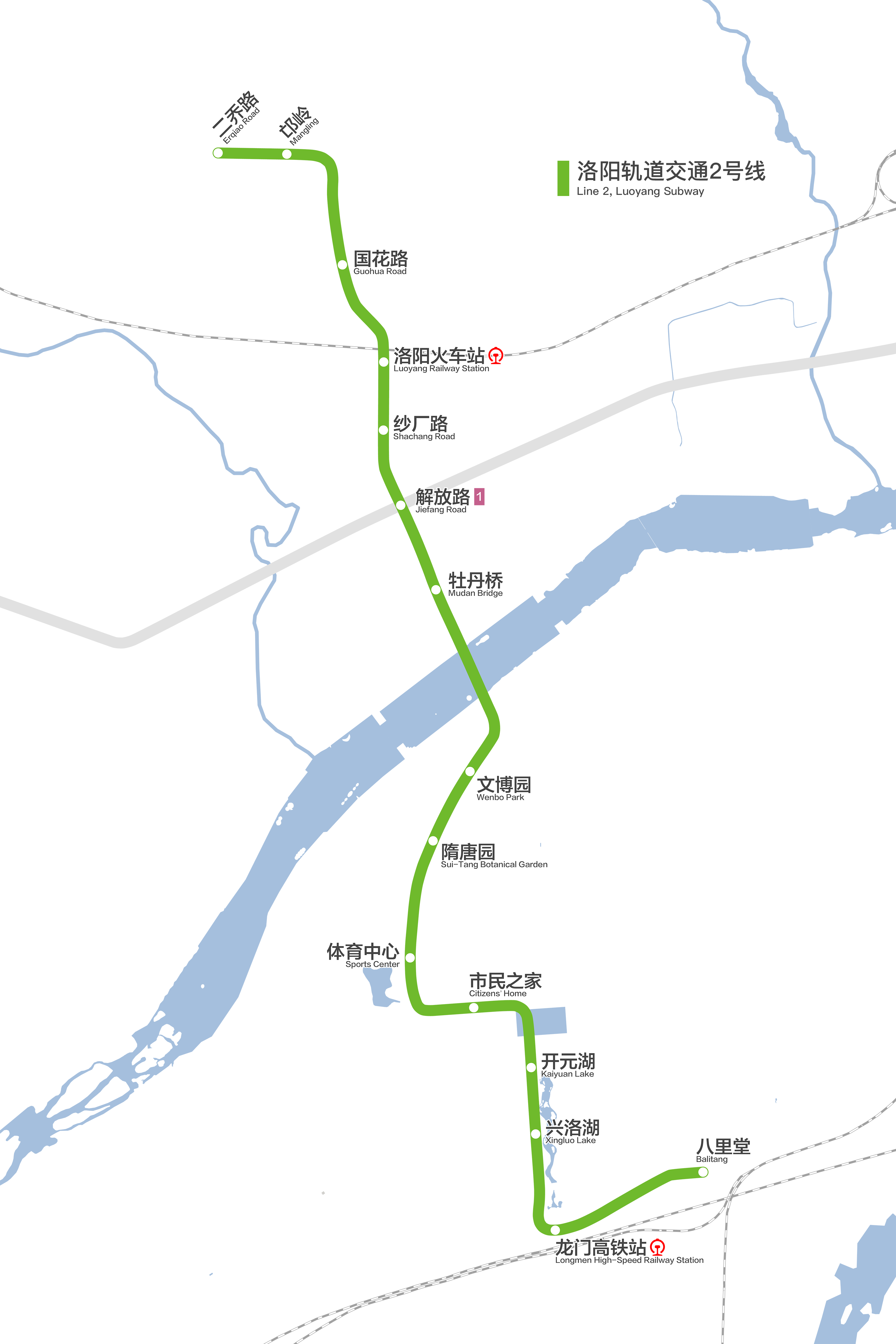

Line 2 of Luoyang Subway (Chinese: 洛阳轨道交通2号线) is the second metro line to open in Luoyang, Henan, China, which opened on 26 December 2021. The line is currently 18.216 km (11.319 mi) long with 15 stations.

== Opening timeline ==
Segment	Commencement	Length	Station(s)	Name
Erqiao Road — Balitang	26 December 2021	18.216 km (11.32 mi)	15	Phase 1

== Stations ==
Station name		Connections	Distance km		Location
English	Chinese	Connections	Distance km		Location
Erqiao Road	二乔路		-	0	Laocheng
Mangling	邙岭				Laocheng / Xigong
Guohua Road	国花路				Laocheng / Xigong
Luoyang Railway Station	洛阳火车站				Xigong
Shachang Road	纱厂路				Xigong
Jiefang Road	解放路	1			Xigong
Mudan Bridge	牡丹桥				Xigong
Wenbo Park	文博园				Luolong
Sui-Tang Botanical Garden	隋唐园				Luolong
Sports Center	体育中心				Luolong
Citizens' Home	市民之家				Luolong
Kaiyuan Lake	开元湖				Luolong
Xingluo Lake	兴洛湖				Luolong
Longmen High-Speed Railway Station	龙门高铁站				Luolong
Balitang	八里堂				Luolong
