= Luoyang Longmen railway station =

Railway station in Luoyang, China

Luoyang Longmen 洛阳龙门
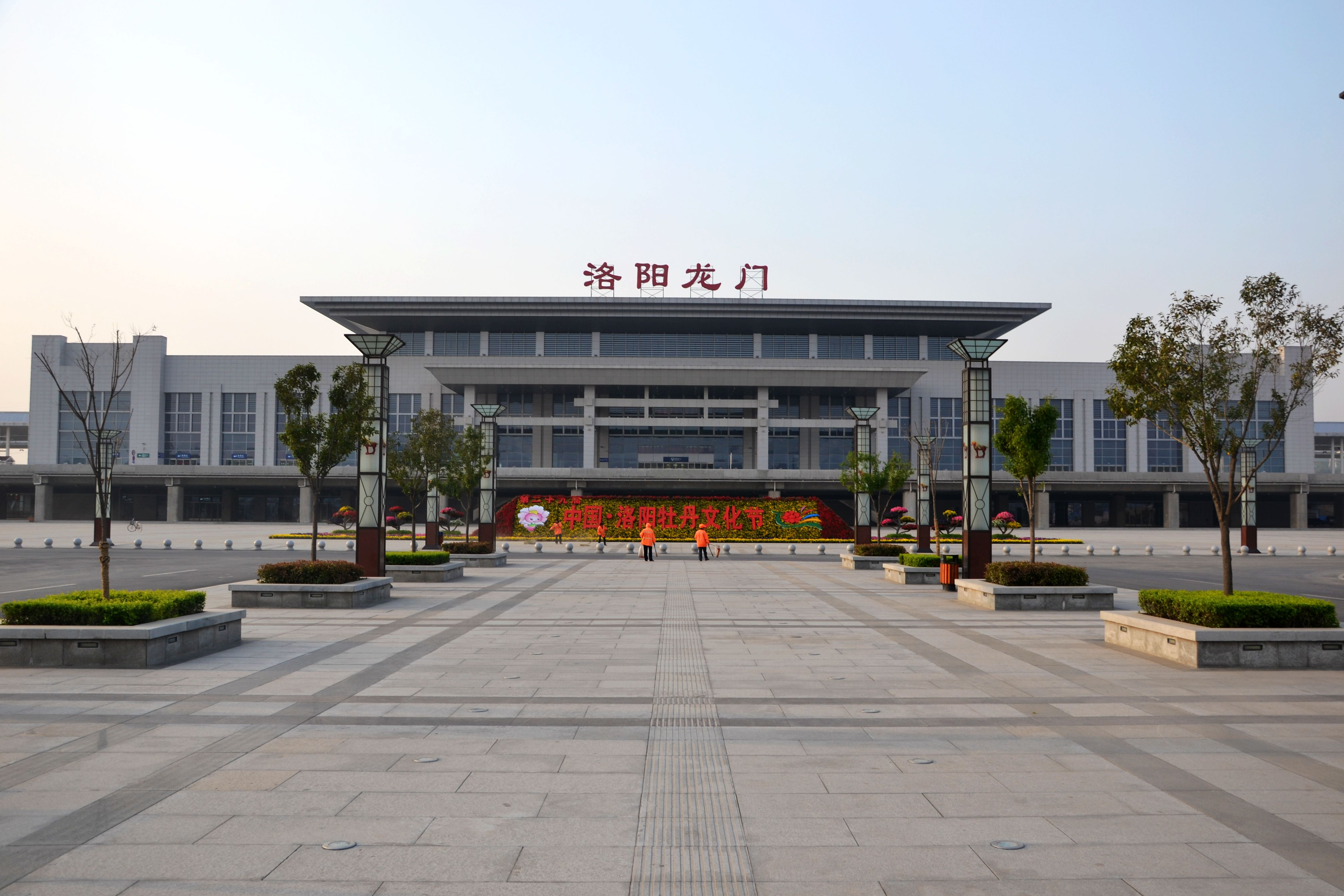

General information
- Location: 19 Tongqu Road; Luolong District, Luoyang, Henan; China
- Coordinates: 34.59514°N 112.45235°E
- Operator: CR Zhengzhou
- Line: Zhengzhou–Xi'an high-speed railway
- Platforms: 5 (2 island platforms and 1 side platform)
- Tracks: 7
- Connections: Bus terminal

Other information
- Station code: 39053 (TMIS code); LLF (telegraph code); LYM (Pinyin code)
- Classification: 1st class station

History
- Opened: 6 February 2010
- Former names: Luoyang South
Location
- Location within Henan Location within China

The Luoyang Longmen railway station (simplified Chinese: 洛阳龙门站; traditional Chinese: 洛陽龍門站; pinyin: Luòyáng Lóngmén Zhàn) is a railway station part of the Xuzhou–Lanzhou High-Speed Railway. The station is located in Luoyang, Henan, China. It was previous known as Luoyang South railway station (simplified Chinese: 洛阳南站; traditional Chinese: 洛陽南站; pinyin: Luòyáng Nán Zhàn).

== History ==
Station construction began on December 9, 2008. Prior to opening, it was renamed from Luoyang South Station to Luoyang Longmen Station on December 15, 2009. Luoyang Longmen railway station opened on February 6, 2010.

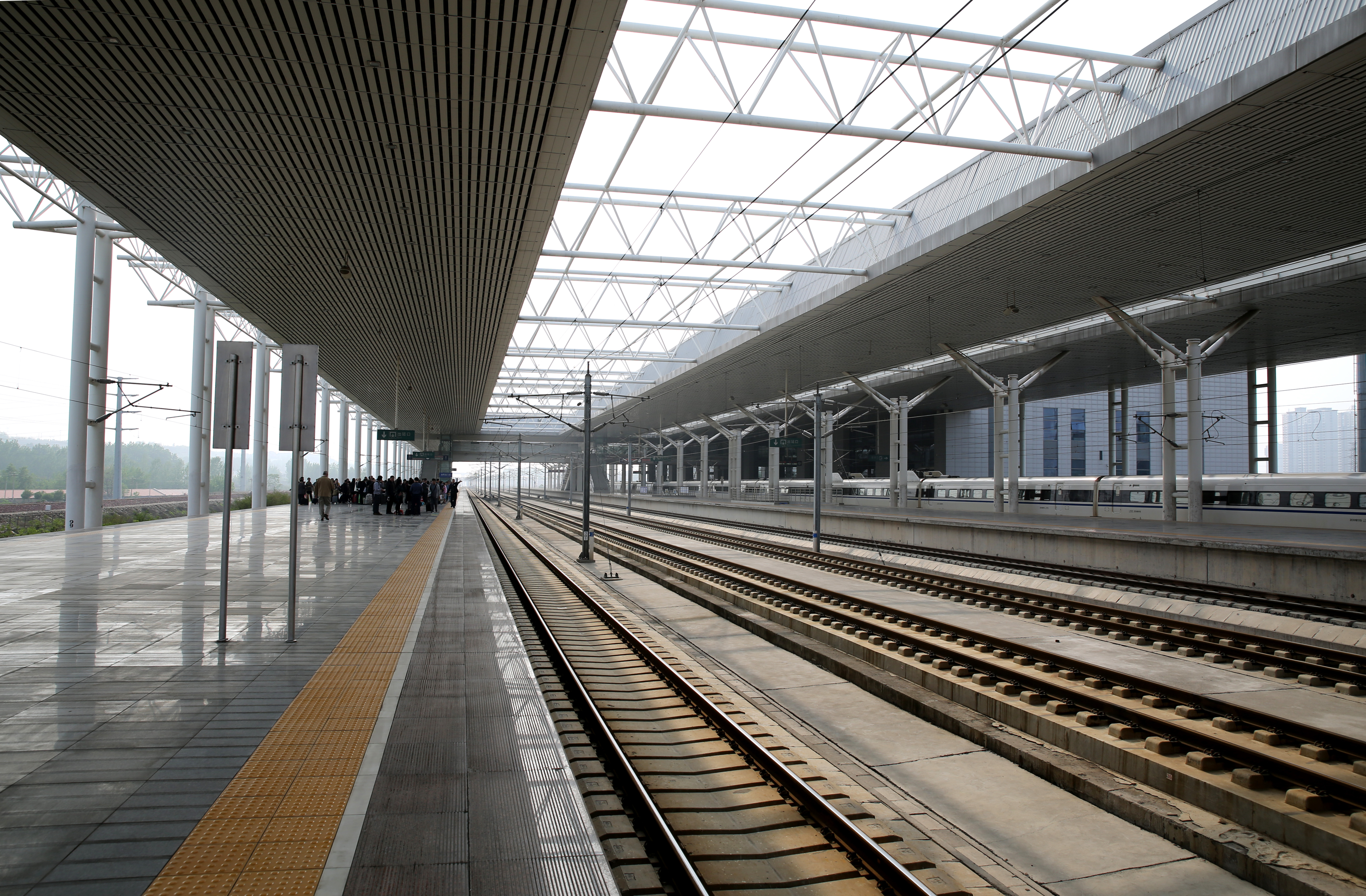
Platforms of Luoyang Longmen railway station

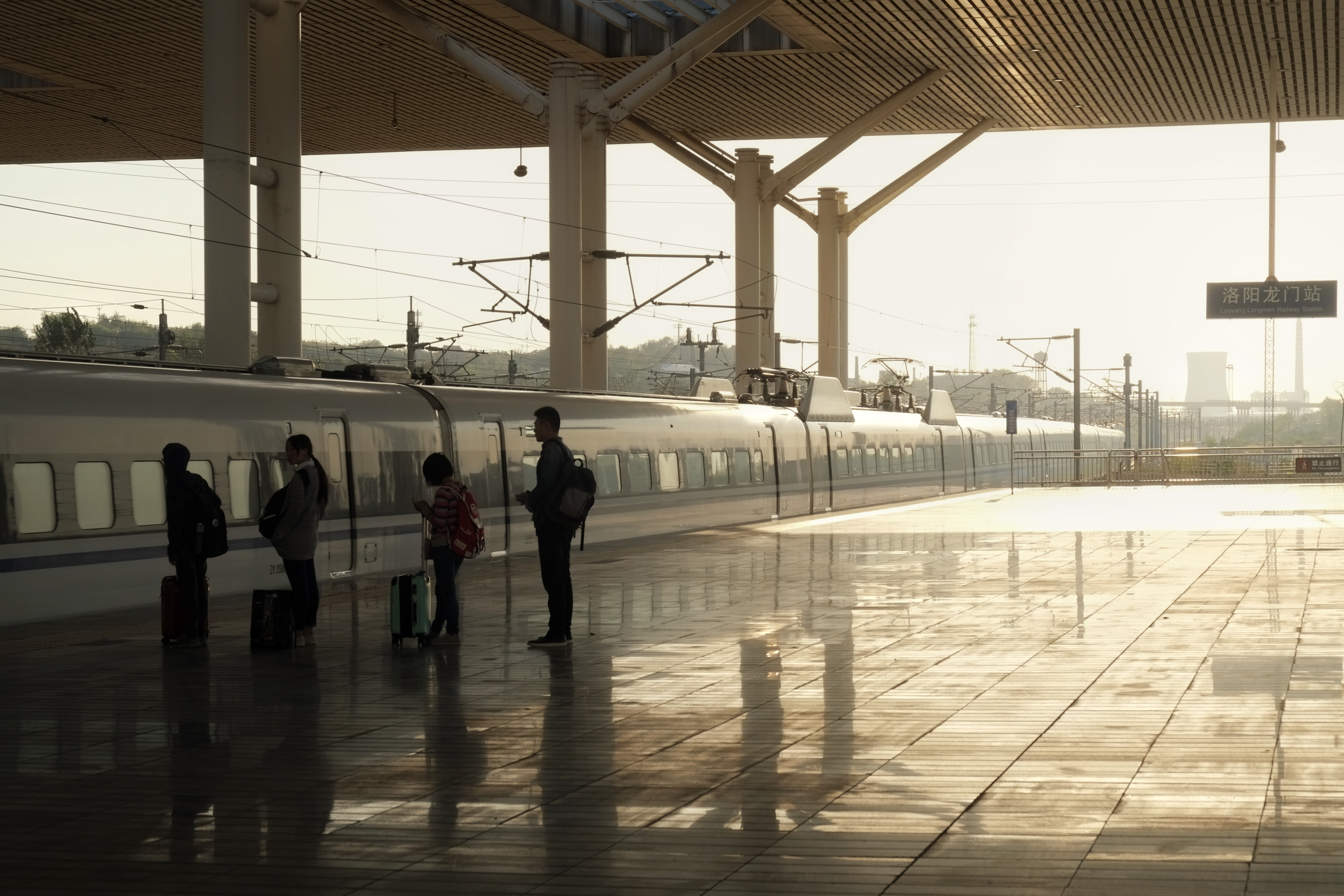
Platforms of Luoyang Longmen railway station

== Metro Station ==
Line 2 of the Luoyang Subway opened on 26 December 2021.

== See also ==
- Longmen Grottoes
- Luoyang railway station

Preceding station	China Railway High-speed	Following station
Gongyi South towards Zhengzhou	Zhengzhou–Xi'an high-speed railway Part of the Eurasia Continental Bridge corridor	Mianchi South towards Xi'an North
