= Jili, Luoyang =

Jili 吉利区
- District
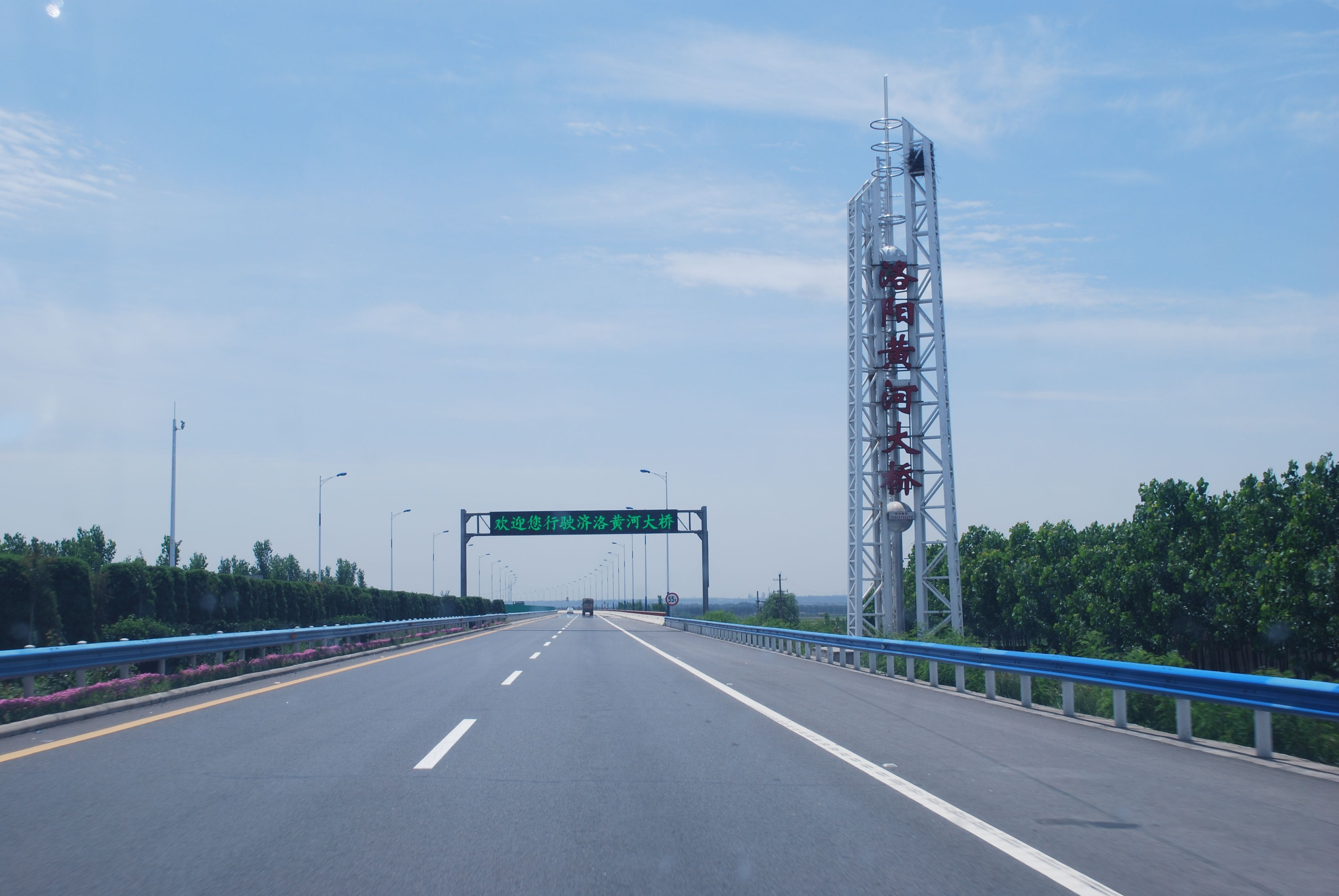
- Entrance to Jili District

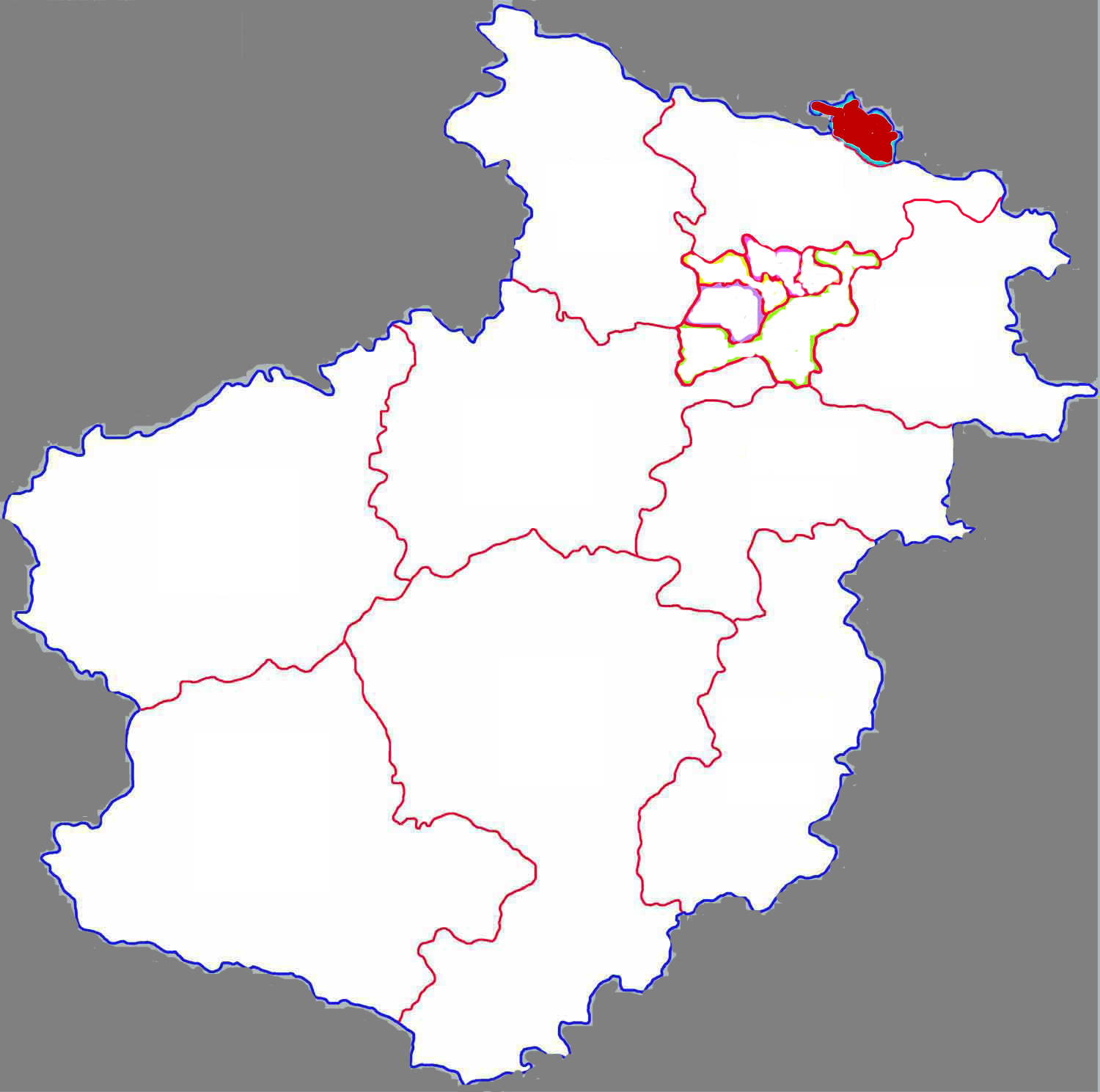
- Jili in Luoyang

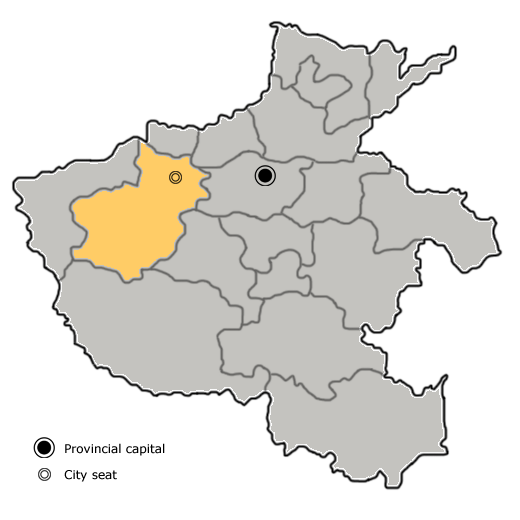
- Luoyang in Henan
- Coordinates: 34°54′04″N 112°35′20″E
- Country: People's Republic of China
- Province: Henan
- Prefecture-level city: Luoyang

Area
  - Total: 80 km^{2} (31 sq mi)

Population (2019)
  - Total: 72,300
  - Density: 900/km^{2} (2,300/sq mi)
- Time zone: UTC+8 (China Standard)
- Postal code: 471012

Jili District (Chinese: 吉利区; pinyin: Jílì Qū) was a former district of the city of Luoyang, Henan province, China. It was merged into Mengjin District of Luoyang in March 2021. It was established in 1982 for the construction of Luoyang Refinery (currently the Luoyang Petrochemical General Plant).

It was the only county-level division of Luoyang that is situated north of the Yellow River and is not contiguous with the other five districts of Luoyang.

== Administrative divisions ==
As of 2020, this district is divided to 4 subdistricts.

Subdistricts

- Xixiayuan Subdistrict (西霞院街道)
- Kangle Subdistrict (康乐街道)
- Jili Subdistrict (吉利街道)
- Heyang Subdistrict (河阳街道)
