= Qilihe station =

Qilihe station (Chinese: 七里河站) may refer to the following stations:

- Qilihe station (Zhengzhou Metro), a metro station on Line 4 Line 5 (Zhengzhou Metro), China
- Qilihe station (Lanzhou Metro), a metro station on Line 1 (Lanzhou Metro), China
- Qilihe station (Luoyang Subway), a metro station on Line 1 (Luoyang Subway), China
