= Sai Kung =

Sai Kung may refer to:

- Sai Kung Town, or just Sai Kung, a town and administrative area in the Sai Kung District, Hong Kong
- Sai Kung Peninsula, a peninsula in Hong Kong
- Sai Kung District, an administrative district in Hong Kong, which does not cover the northern half of Sai Kung Peninsula

== See also ==
- Sai Kung District Council
- Sai Kung Commons, a political grouping
- Sai Kung Hoi, a bay near Sai Kung Town, Hong Kong
- Sai Kung East Country Park
- Sai Kung West Country Park
- Sai Kung West Country Park (Wan Tsai Extension)
- Tseung Kwan O New Town, another town centre of Sai Kung District
