= Luoyang =

City in Henan, China

Luoyang 洛阳市 Loyang
- Prefecture-level city
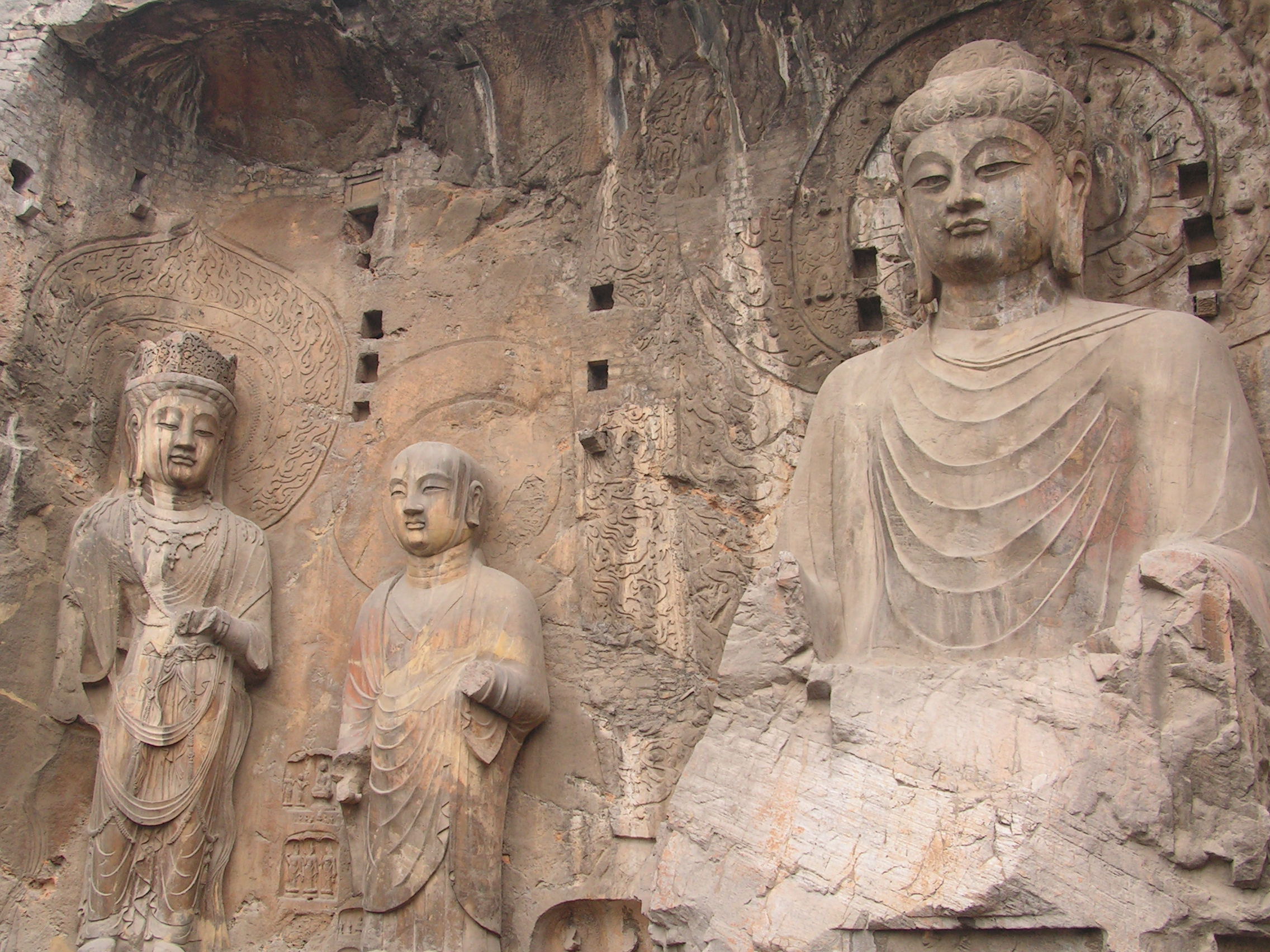
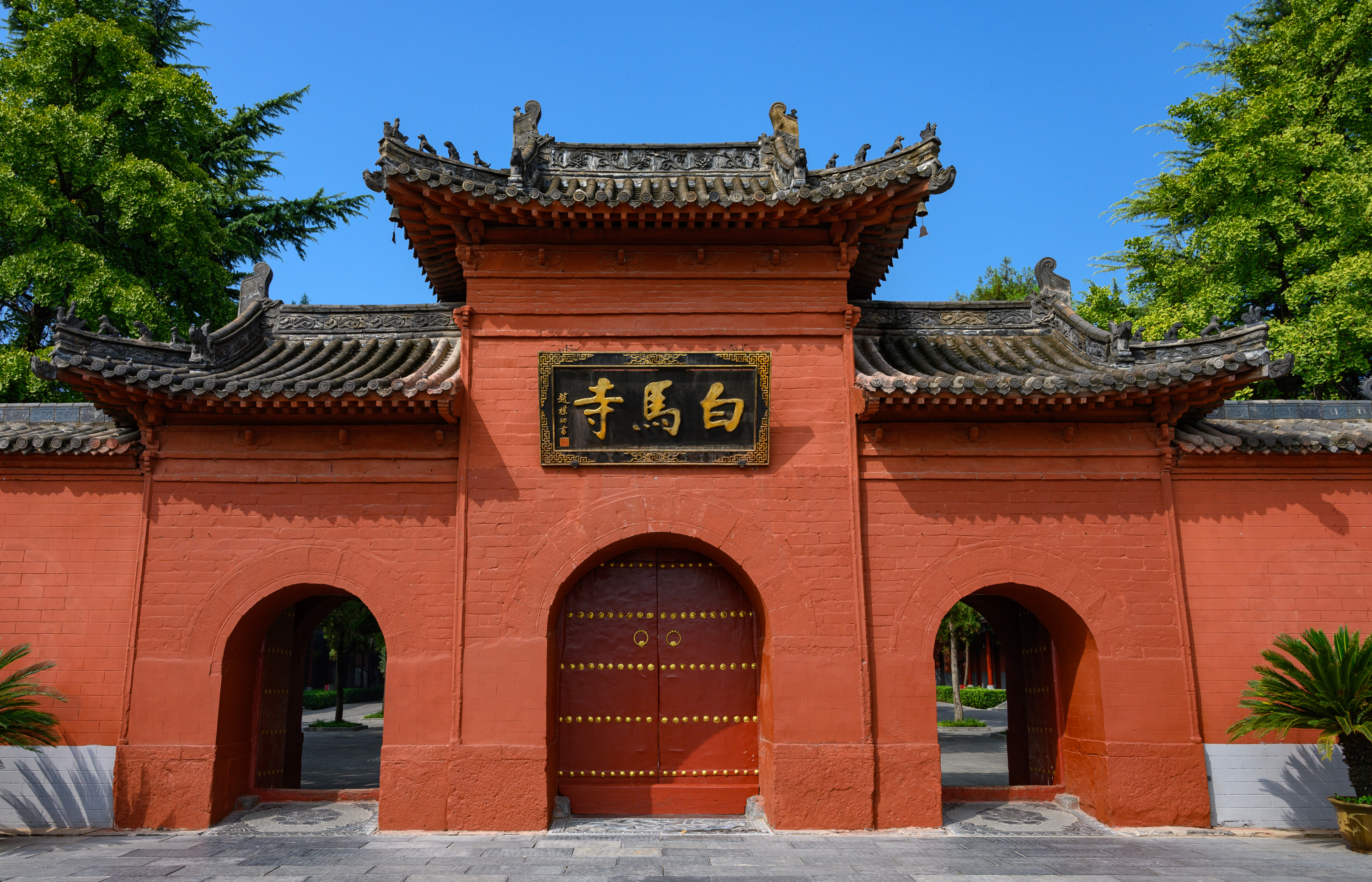
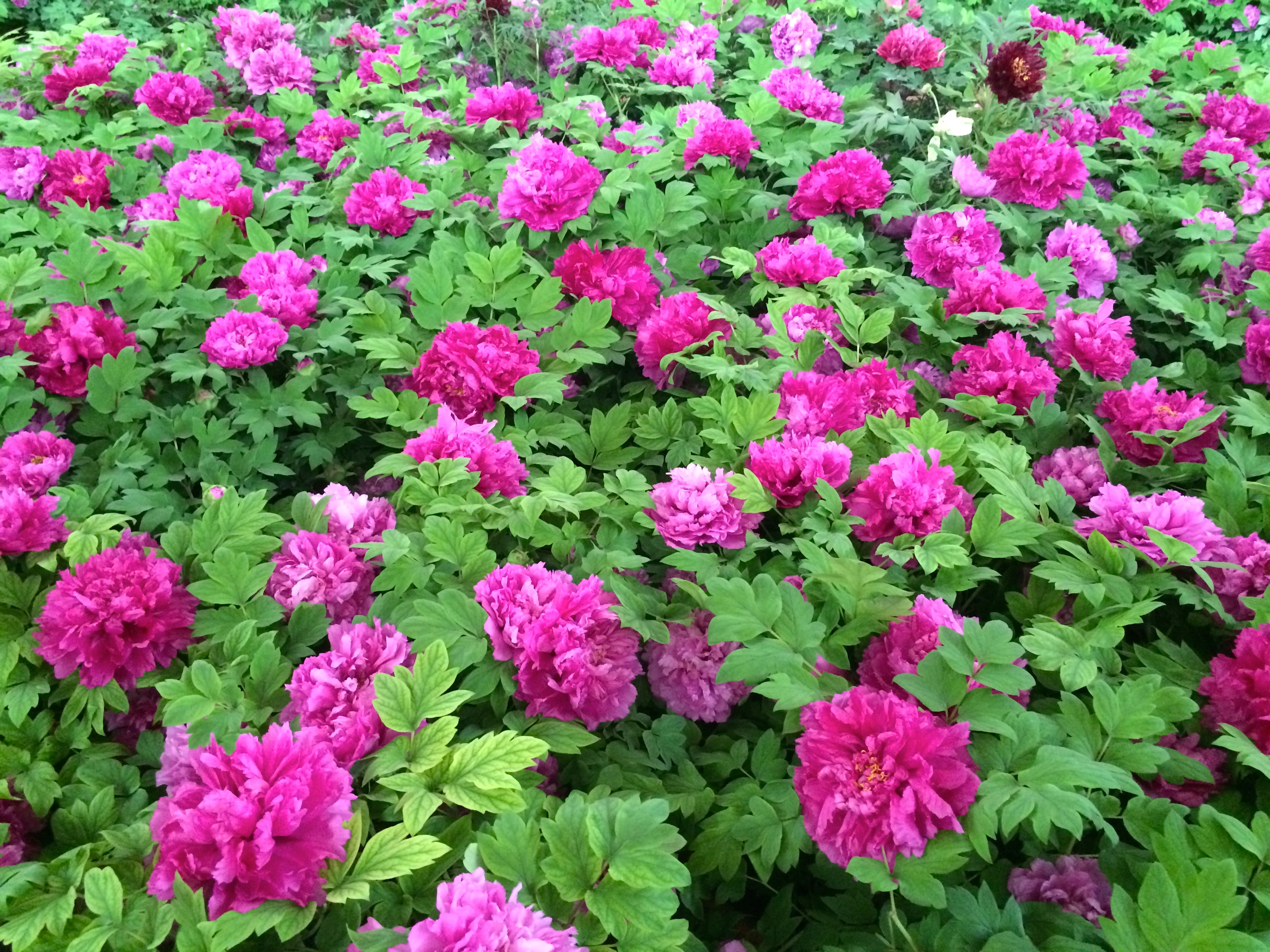
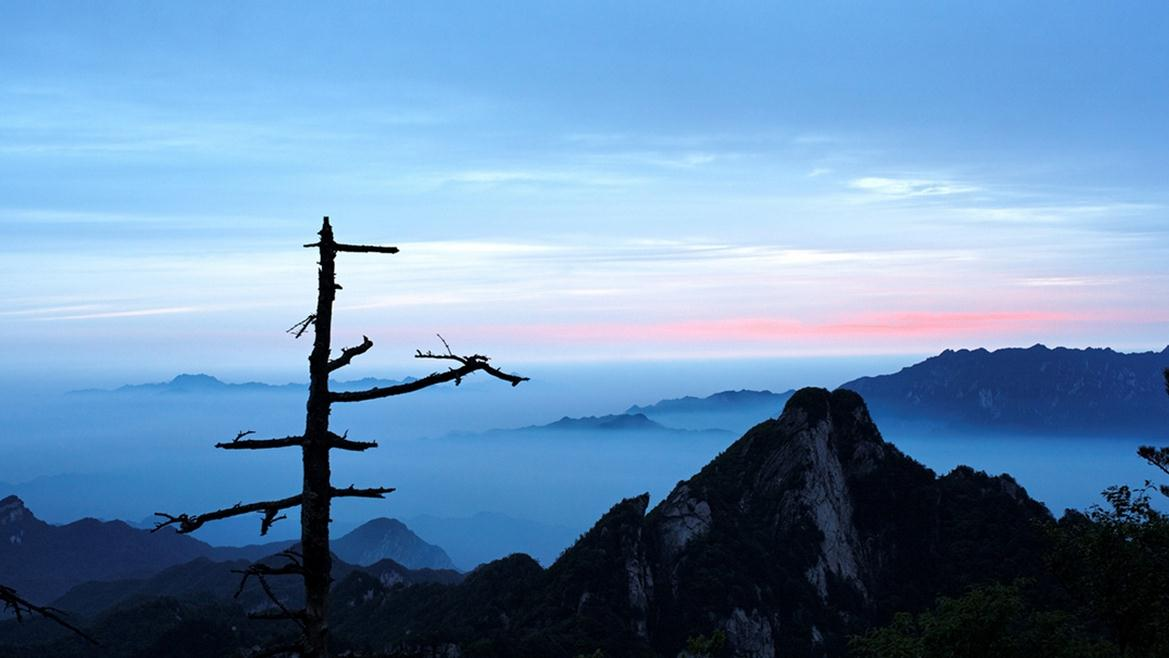
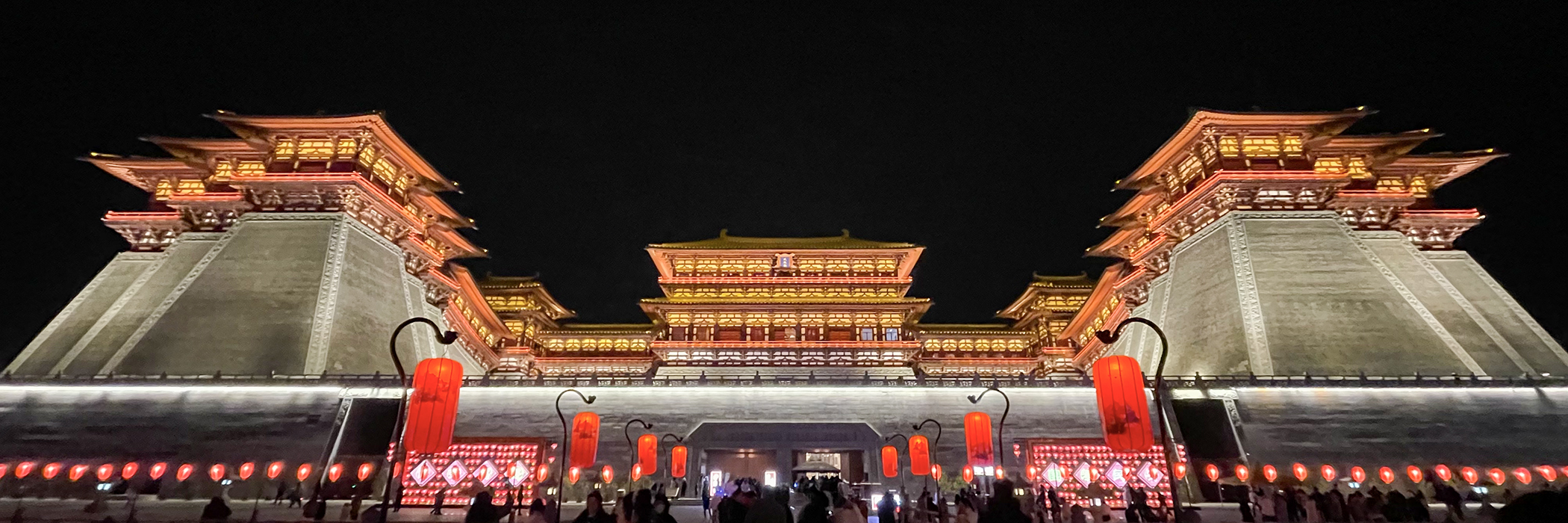
- Longmen Grottoes White Horse Temple Mudan in Luoyang Baiyun Mountain Yingtian Gate

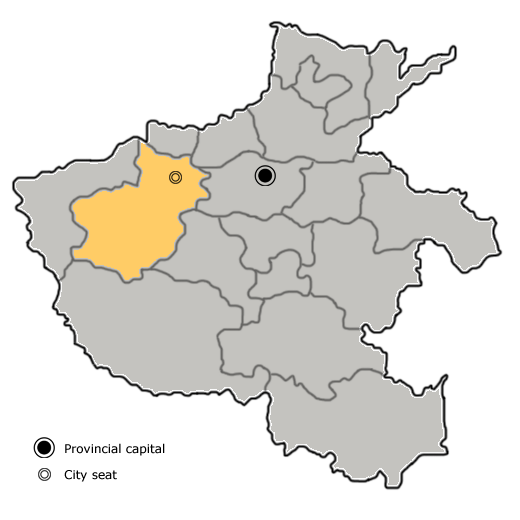
- Location of Luoyang City jurisdiction in Henan

- Location on the North China Plain Luoyang (China)
- Coordinates (Luoyang municipal government): 34°37′11″N 112°27′14″E
- Country: People's Republic of China
- Province: Henan
- Municipal seat: Luolong District

Government
  - Party Secretary: Li Ya
  - Mayor: Liu Wankang

Area
  - Prefecture-level city: 15,229.15 km^{2} (5,880.01 sq mi)
  - Urban: 810.4 km^{2} (312.9 sq mi)
  - Metro: 1,402.3 km^{2} (541.4 sq mi)
- Elevation: 144 m (472 ft)

Population (2020 census, 2018 for otherwise)
  - Prefecture-level city: 7,056,699
  - Density: 463.3679/km^{2} (1,200.117/sq mi)
  - Urban: 2,249,300
  - Urban density: 2,776/km^{2} (7,189/sq mi)
  - Metro: 2,751,400
  - Metro density: 1,962.1/km^{2} (5,081.7/sq mi)

GDP
  - Prefecture-level city: CN¥ 382.0 billion US$ 57.5 billion
  - Per capita: CN¥ 56,410; US$ 8,493
- Time zone: UTC+8 (China Standard)
- Area code: 379
- ISO 3166 code: CN-HA-03
- Ethnicities: Han, Hui, Manchu, Mongolian
- County-level divisions: 15
- License plate prefixes: 豫C
- Website: www.ly.gov.cn

Luoyang is a city located in the confluence area of the Luo River and the Yellow River in the west of Henan province, China. Governed as a prefecture-level city, it borders the provincial capital of Zhengzhou to the east, Pingdingshan to the southeast, Nanyang to the south, Sanmenxia to the west, Jiyuan to the north, and Jiaozuo to the northeast. As of December 31, 2018, Luoyang had a population of 6,888,500 inhabitants with 2,751,400 people living in the built-up (or metro) area made of the city's five out of six urban districts (except the Jili District not continuously urbanized) and Yanshi District, later being conurbated. By the end of 2022, Luoyang Municipality had jurisdiction over 7 municipal districts, 7 counties and 1 development zone. The permanent population was 7.079 million as of 2022.

Situated on the central plain of China, Luoyang is among the oldest cities in China and one of the cradles of Chinese civilization. It is the earliest of the Four Great Ancient Capitals of China.

== Etymology ==
The name "Luoyang" originates from the city's location on the north or sunny ("yang") side of the Luo River. Since the river flows from west to east and the sun is to the south of the river, the sun always shines on the north side of the river. Luoyang has had several names over the centuries, including Luoyi (洛邑) and Luozhou (洛州), and Luoyang has been its primary name. It has also been called Dongdu (東都; 'eastern capital') during the Tang dynasty, Xijing (西京; 'western capital') during the Song dynasty, or Jingluo (Chinese: 京洛; lit. 'capital Luo'). During the rule of Wu Zetian, the only female emperor in Chinese history, the city was known as Shendu (神都; 'divine capital'). Luoyang was later renamed Henanfu (河南府) until regained its former name in 1912.

== History ==
=== Classical era ===
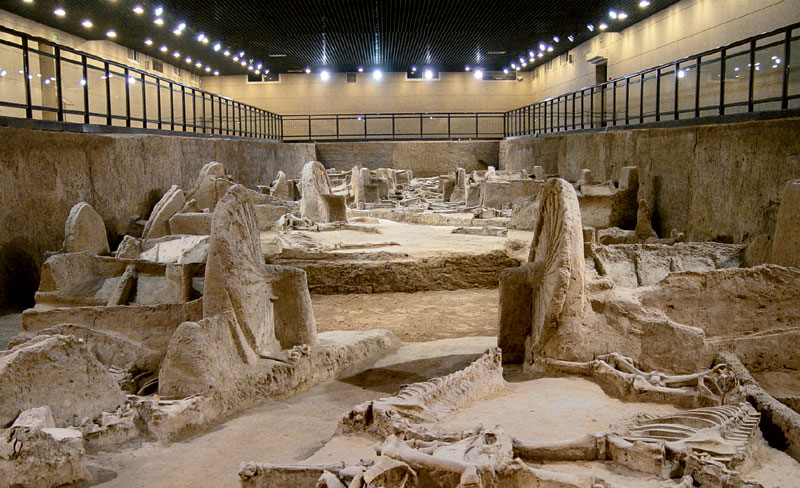
Museum of Luoyang Eastern Zhou Royal Horse and Chariot Pits

In 1036 BC a settlement named Chengzhou (成周) was constructed by the Duke of Zhou for the remnants of the captured Shang nobility. The Duke also moved the Nine Tripod Cauldrons to Chengzhou from the Zhou dynasty capital at Haojing. A second Western Zhou capital, Wangcheng (also: Luoyi) was built 15 km (9.3 mi) west of Chengzhou. Wangcheng became the capital of the Eastern Zhou dynasty in 771 BC. The Eastern Zhou dynasty capital was moved to Chengzhou in 510 BC. Later, the Eastern Han dynasty capital of Luoyang would be built over Chengzhou. Modern Luoyang is built over the ruins of Wangcheng, which are visible at Wangcheng Park.

Qin Shi Huang's chief minister, Lu Buwei, was given Luoyang. Lu began programs to develop and beautify Luoyang. It is said that Liu Bang visited Luoyang and considered making it his capital and was persuaded to reconsider by his ministers to turn to Chang'an instead for his capital.

=== Han dynasty ===
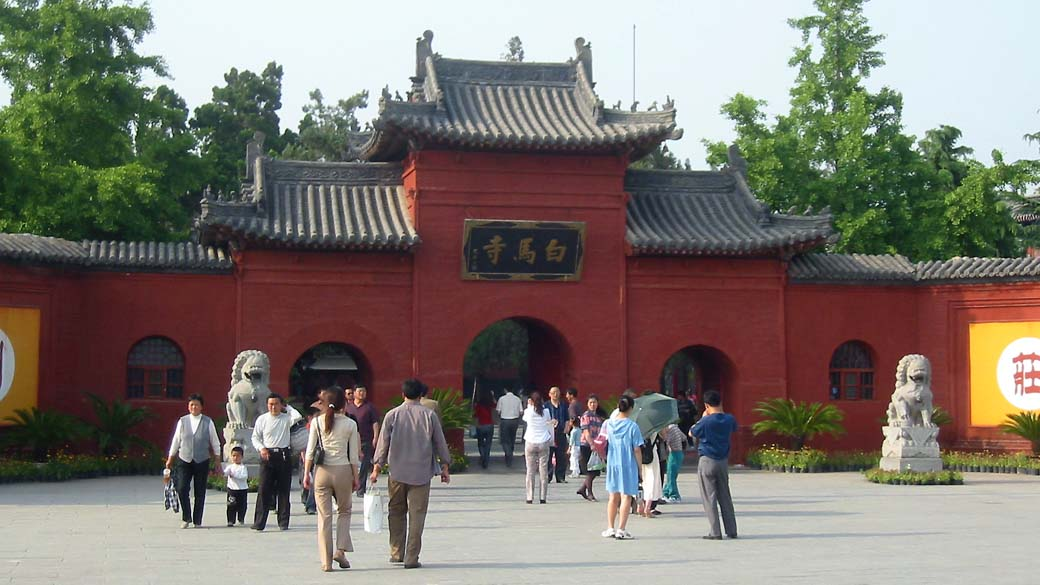
White Horse Temple gate

In 25 AD, Luoyang was declared the capital of the Eastern Han dynasty on November 27 by Emperor Guangwu of Han. The city walls formed a rectangle 4 km south to north and 2.5 km west to east, with the Gu River, a tributary of the Luo River just outside the northern eastern walls. The rectangular Southern Palace and the Northern Palace were 3 km apart and connected by The Covered Way. In 26 AD, the Altar of the Gods of the Soils and Grains, the Altar of Heaven, and the Temple of the Founder, Emperor Gao of Former Han were inaugurated. The Imperial University was restored in 29 AD. In 48 AD, the Yang Canal linked the capital to the Luo. In 56 AD, the main imperial observatory, the Spiritual Terrace, was constructed.

In 166 AD, the first Roman mission, sent by "the king of Da Qin [the Roman Empire], Andun" (Marcus Aurelius Antoninus, r. 161–180 AD), reached Luoyang after arriving by sea in Rinan Commandery in what later is central Vietnam.

The late 2nd century saw China decline into anarchy:

The decline was accelerated by the rebellion of the Yellow Turbans, who, although defeated by the Imperial troops in 184 AD, weakened the state to the point where there was a continuing series of rebellions degenerating into civil war, culminating in the burning of the Han capital of Luoyang on 24 September 189 AD. This was followed by a state of continual unrest and wars in China until a modicum of stability returned in the 220s, but with the establishment of three separate kingdoms, rather than a unified empire.

=== Wei and Jin dynasties ===
On April 4, 190 AD, Chancellor Dong Zhuo ordered his soldiers to ransack, pillage, and raze the city as he retreated from the coalition set up against him by regional lords all over China. The court was subsequently moved to the more defensible western city of Chang'an. Following a period of disorder, during which warlord Cao Cao held the last Han emperor Xian in Xuchang (196–220), Luoyang was restored to prominence when his son Cao Pi, Emperor Wen of the Wei dynasty, declared it his capital in 220 AD. The Jin dynasty, successor to Wei, was also established in Luoyang. At the height of Jin rule, Luoyang had a population of 600,000 and was probably the second largest city in the world after Rome.

At the start of the 4th century, Luoyang was subjected to repeated attacks during the War of the Eight Princes and Upheaval of the Five Barbarians under the Jin. In 311 AD, rebel forces of the Xiongnu-led Han-Zhao dynasty sacked and razed the city in an event known as the Disaster of Yongjia. For the next two centuries, Luoyang remained a contested region among states to come. It was the site of a battle in 328 between the Han-Zhao and Later Zhao dynasties which established the latter as a hegemonic power in the north.

=== Northern Wei ===
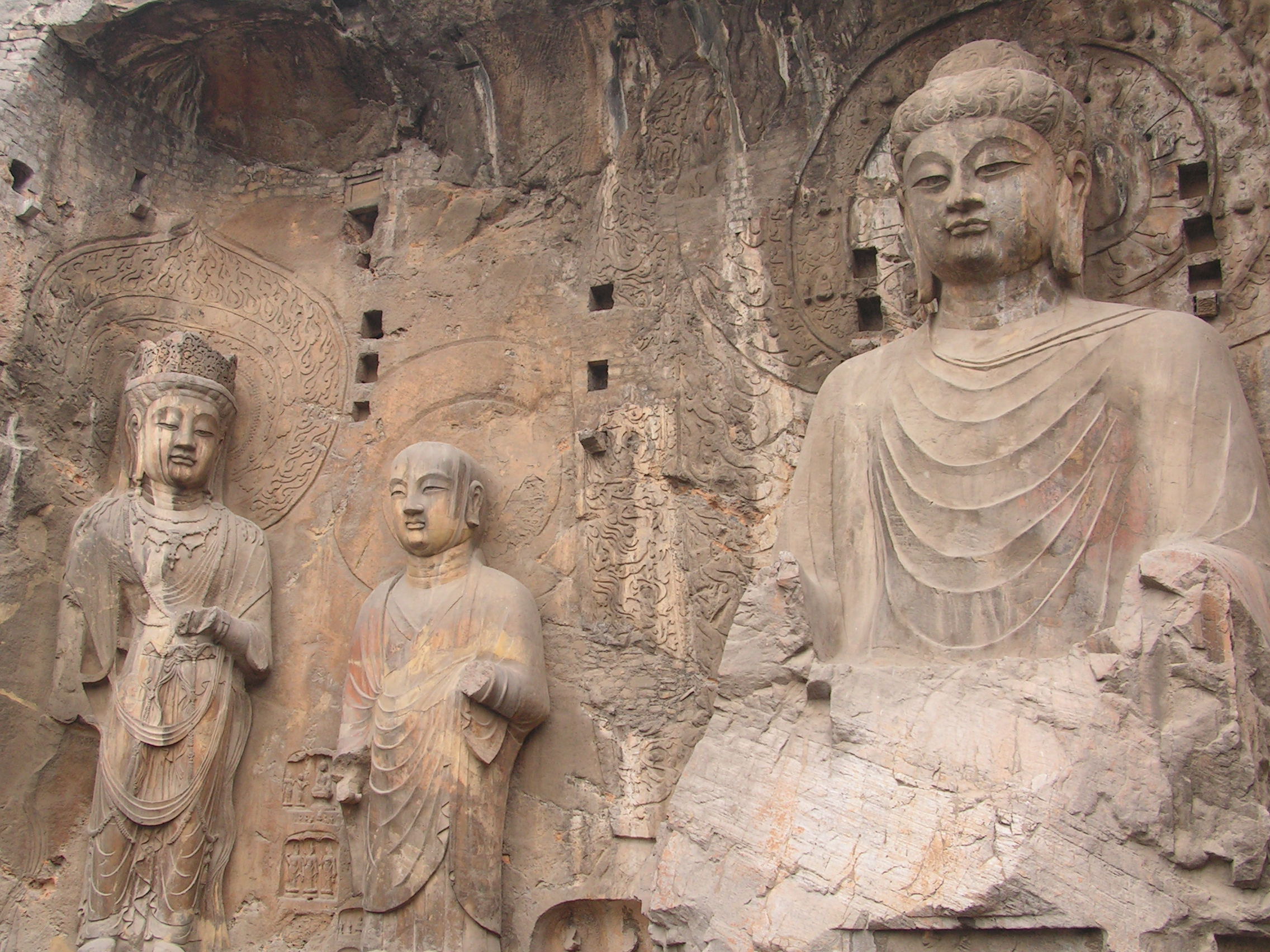
Longmen Grottoes

Luoyang
- "Luoyang" in Simplified (top) and Traditional (bottom) Chinese characters
- Simplified Chinese: 洛阳
- Traditional Chinese: 洛陽
- Literal meaning: "Northern Bank of the Luo [River]"
Transcriptions
Standard Mandarin
- Hanyu Pinyin: Luòyáng
- Wade–Giles: Lo^{4}-yang^{2}
- IPA: [lwô.jǎŋ]
Yue: Cantonese
- Yale Romanization: Lohk-yèuhng
- Jyutping: Lok^{6}-joeng^{4}
- IPA: [lɔk̚˨.jœŋ˩]
Southern Min
- Tâi-lô: Lo̍k-iông

In winter 416, during Liu Yu's northern expedition against the Later Qin, Luoyang fell to the Jin general Tan Daoji. In 422, the city was captured by Xianbei-led Northern Wei dynasty. The Liu Song dynasty, which succeeded the Jin, recovered the city in 430, and by the 460s, Luoyang was definitively under Wei control. In 493 AD, as part of his sinicization campaign, Emperor Xiaowen of Northern Wei moved the capital from Datong to Luoyang, moving over 150,000 people to the site by 495, and started the construction of the rock-cut Longmen Grottoes. More than 30,000 Buddhist statues from the time of this dynasty have been found in the caves (which were chapels dug into cliffs). The classical temple located at the caves, "Gate of Dragons," protected the statues/sculptures and the cave of Buddha. Some of these sculptures were two-faced. At the same time, the Shaolin Temple was also built by the Emperor to accommodate an Indian monk on the Mount Song next to Luoyang City. The Yongning Temple, the tallest pagoda in China, was also built in Luoyang. The city reached a population of 600,000 at its height during the Northern Wei. The city was destroyed by the warlord Gao Huan, who captured the city and forced its population to move to his capital at Ye in 534.

=== Sui and Tang dynasties ===
When Emperor Yang of Sui took control in 604 AD he founded the new Luoyang on the site of the existing city using a layout inspired by his father Emperor Wen of Sui's work in newly rebuilt Chang'an.

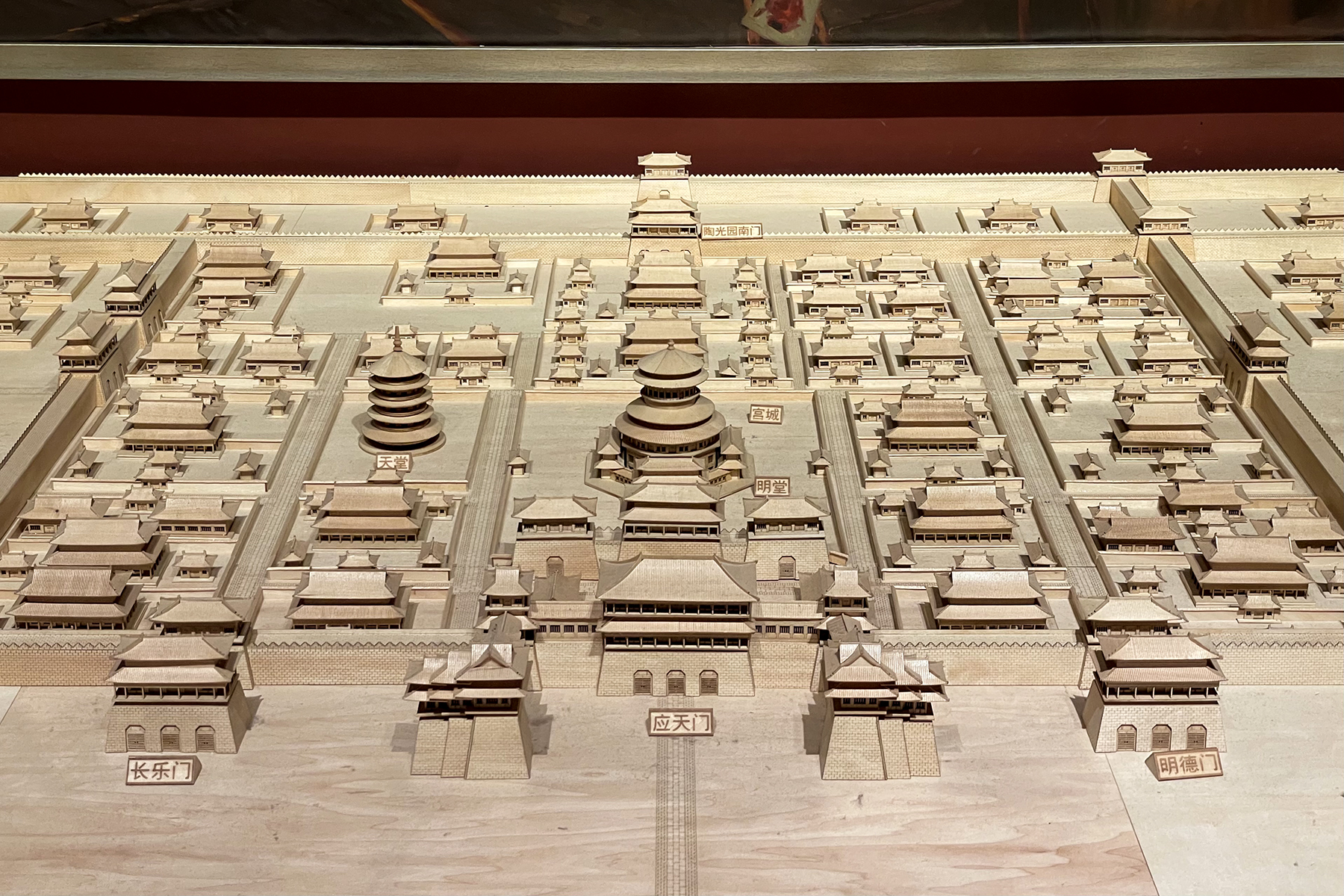
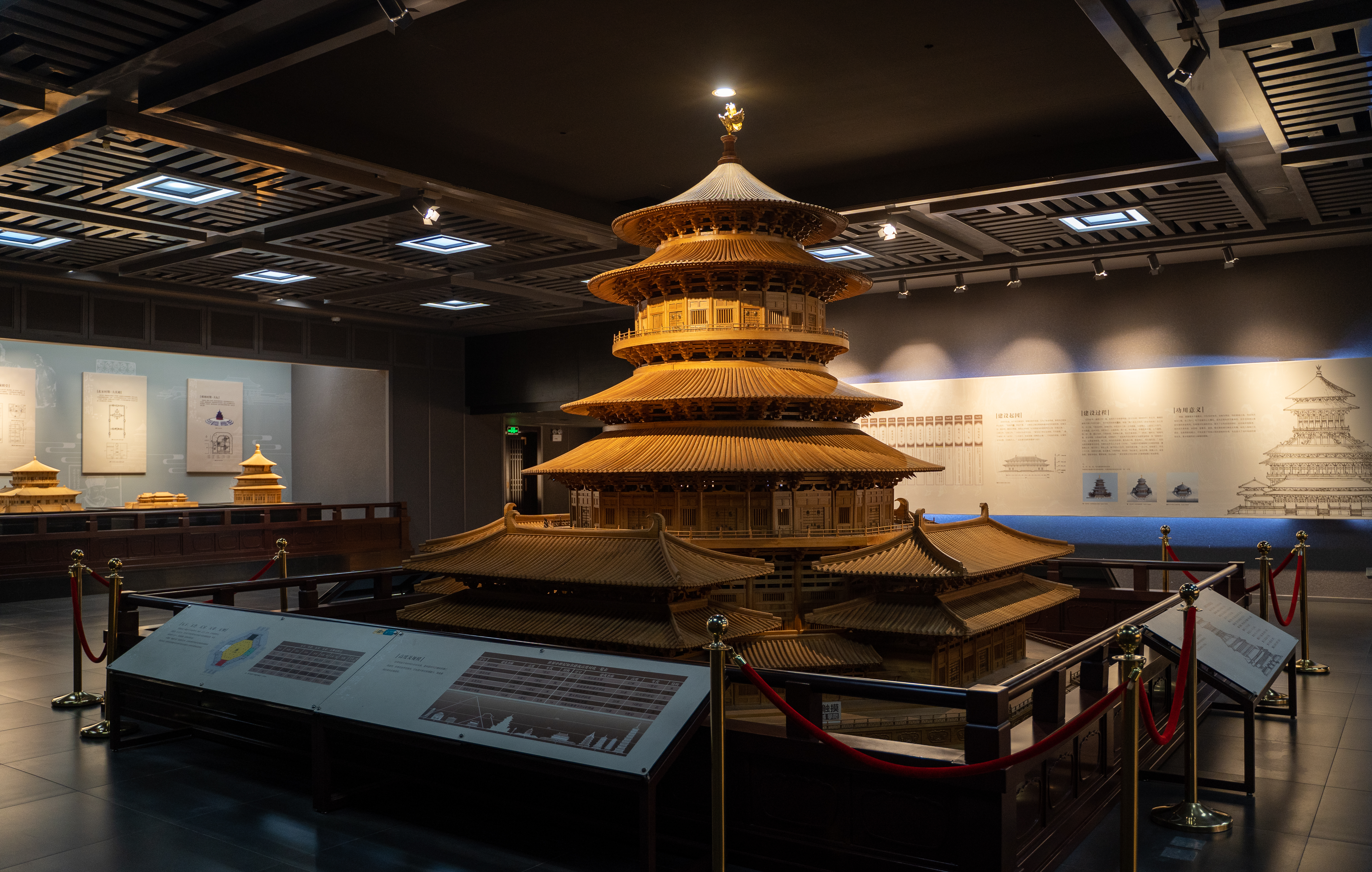
Model of Luoyang palace city during Wu Zetian's reign. Construction projects were commissioned during Wu Zetian's time, such as the Bright Hall of Luoyang (right) commissioned by Wu Zetian (original 294 chi = 93m tall).

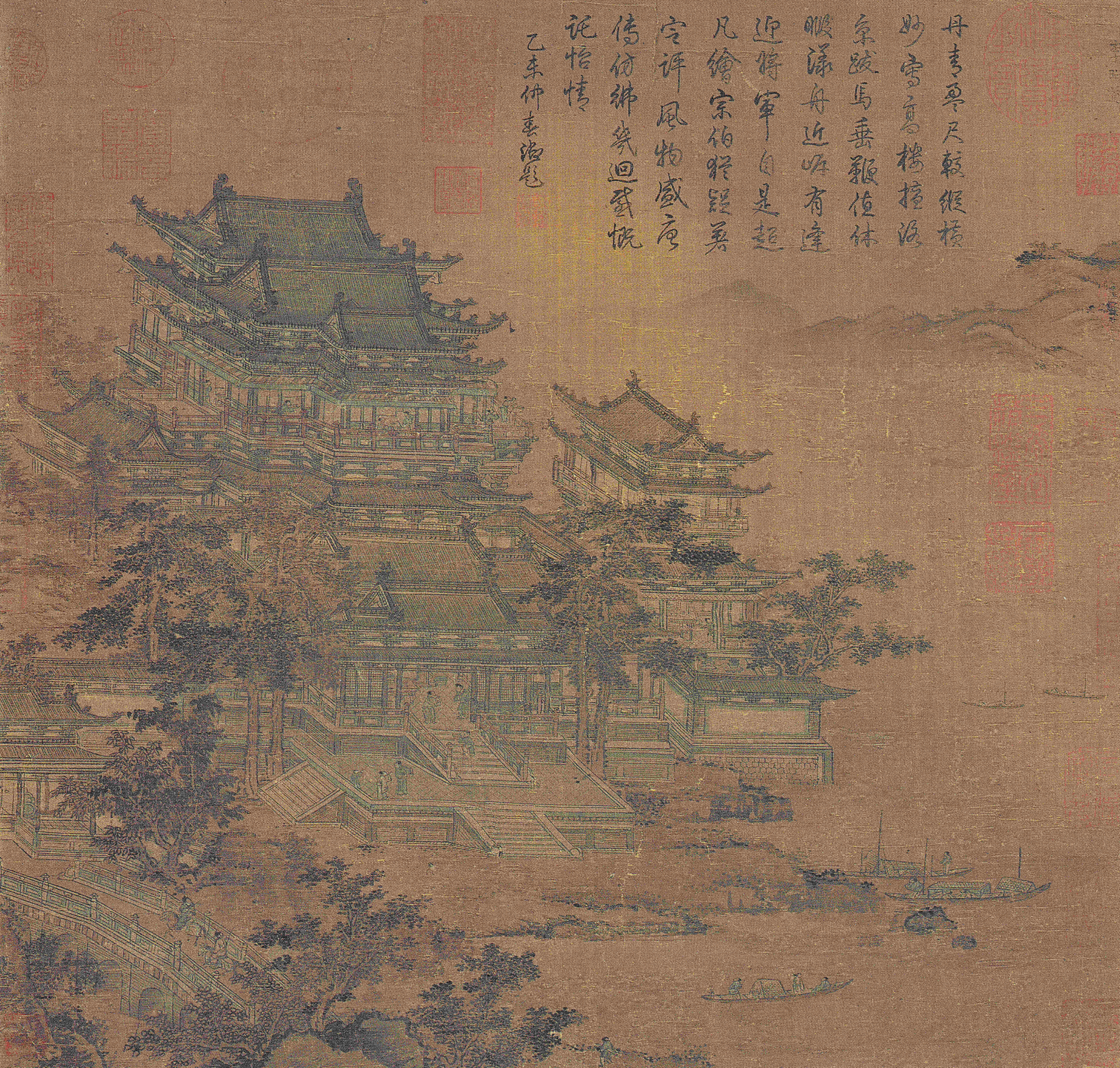
The Luoyang Pavilion by Li Zhaodao (675–758)

During the Tang dynasty, Luoyang was Dongdu (東都), the "Eastern Capital", and at its height had a population of around one million, second only to Chang'an, which, at the time, was the largest city in the world.

During an interval in the Tang dynasty, the first and the only empress in Chinese history – Empress Wu, moved the capital of her Zhou dynasty to Luoyang and named it as Shen Du (Capital of the God). She constructed the tallest palace in Chinese history, which is later in the site of Sui Tang Luoyang city. Luoyang was damaged during the An Lushan Rebellion.

Epitaphs were found dating from the Tang dynasty of a Christian couple in Luoyang of a Nestorian Christian Sogdian woman, Lady An (安氏), who died in 821, and her Nestorian Christian Han Chinese husband, Hua Xian (花献), who died in 827. These Han Chinese Christian men may have married Sogdian Christian women because of a lack of Han Chinese women belonging to the Christian religion, limiting their choice of spouses among the same ethnicity. Another epitaph in Luoyang of a Nestorian Christian Sogdian woman also surnamed An was discovered and she was put in her tomb by her military officer son on 22 January, 815. This Sogdian woman's husband was surnamed He (和) and he was a Han Chinese man and the family was indicated to be multiethnic on the epitaph pillar. In Luoyang, the mixed raced sons of Nestorian Christian Sogdian women and Han Chinese men has career paths available for them. Neither their mixed ethnicity nor their faith were barriers and they were able to become civil officials, a military officers and openly celebrated their Christian religion and support Christian monasteries. Central Asians like Sogdians were called "Hu" (胡) by the Chinese during the Tang dynasty. Central Asian "Hu" women were stereotyped as barmaids or dancers by Han in China. Occasionally, "Hu" women would be involved in prostitution as the "Hu" women in China were at times in occupations that doubled as illicit services.

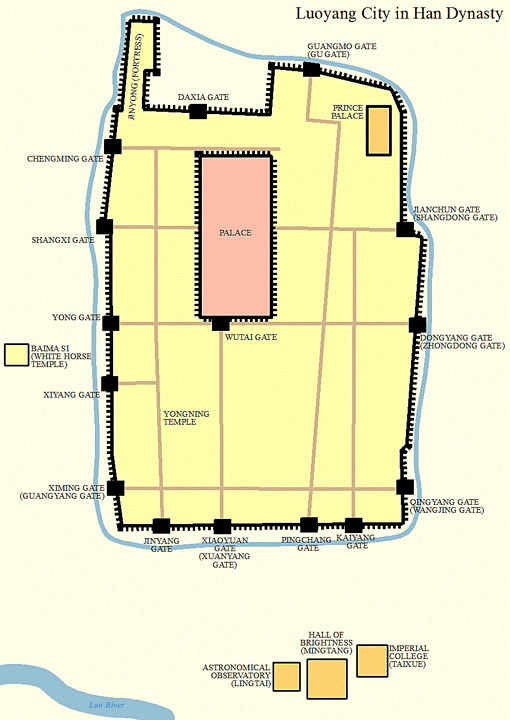
Map of Luoyang during the Eastern Han dynasty when it was the capital of China

=== Song dynasty ===
During the Northern Song dynasty, Luoyang was the 'Western Capital' and birthplace of Zhao Kuangyin, the founder of the Song dynasty. It served as a cultural center, housing some philosophers. This prosperity was mainly caused by Luoyang undergoing new developments and reconstruction during this period.

== UNESCO World Heritage Site ==
- Longmen Grottoes, added to the UNESCO World Heritage List in 2000
- The Grand Canal – Huiluo Barn, Hanjia Barn, added to the UNESCO World Heritage List in 2014
- Silk Roads – Han Wei Luoyang City Site, Dingding Gate Site of Sui Tang Luoyang City, Xin'an Hangu Guan Site, added to the UNESCO World Heritage List in 2014

== Administrative divisions ==
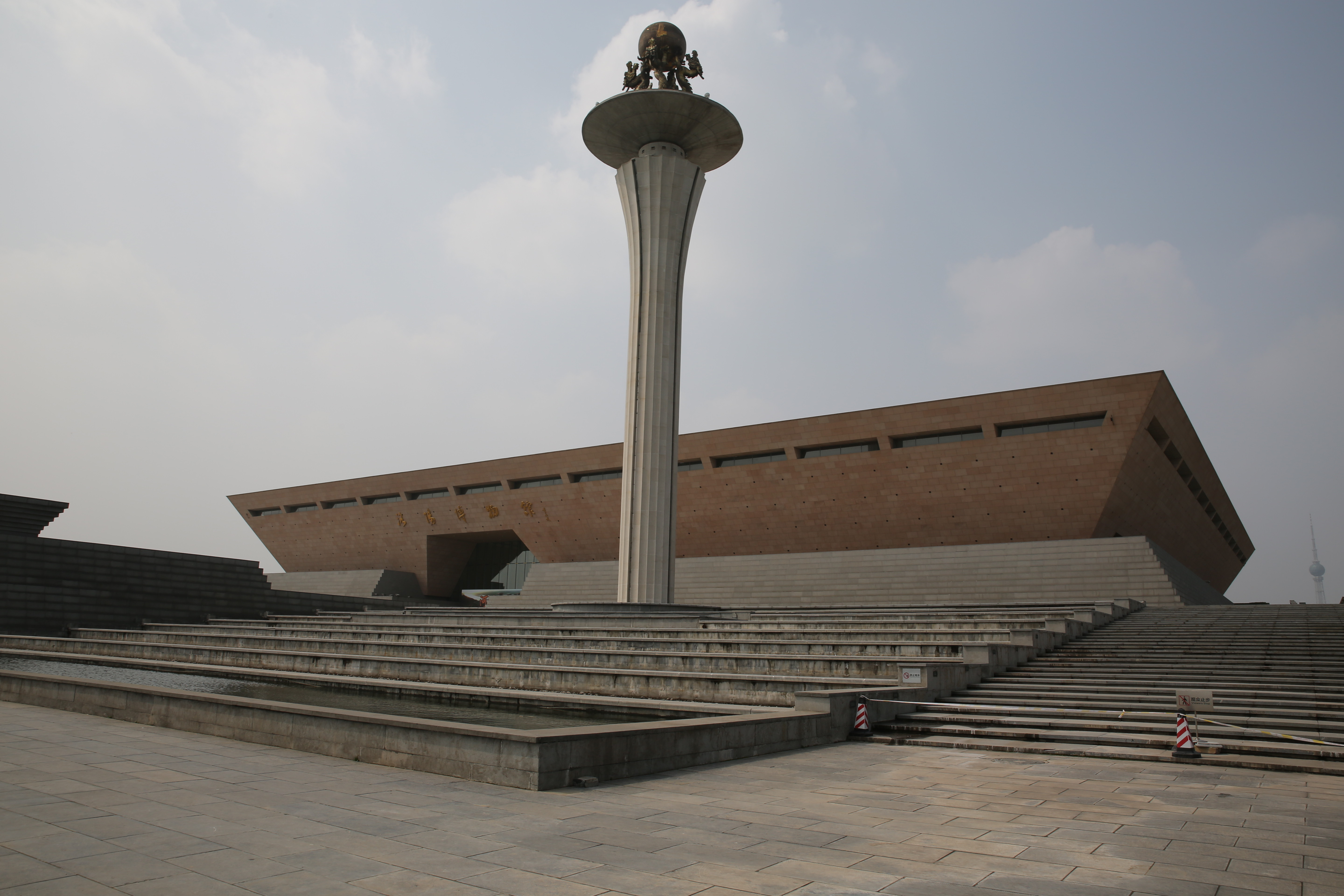
Luoyang Museum

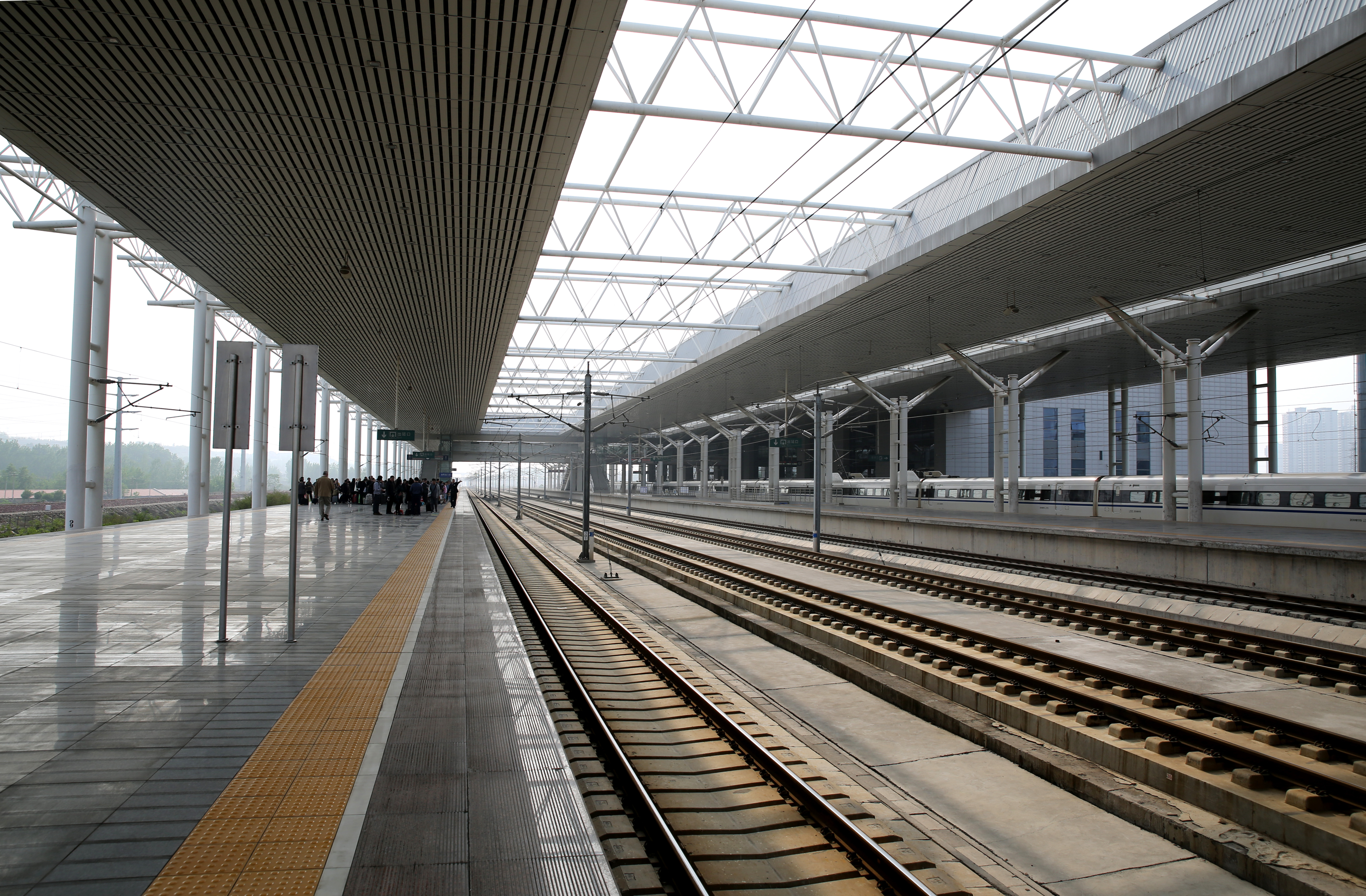
Luoyang Longmen railway station (HSR)

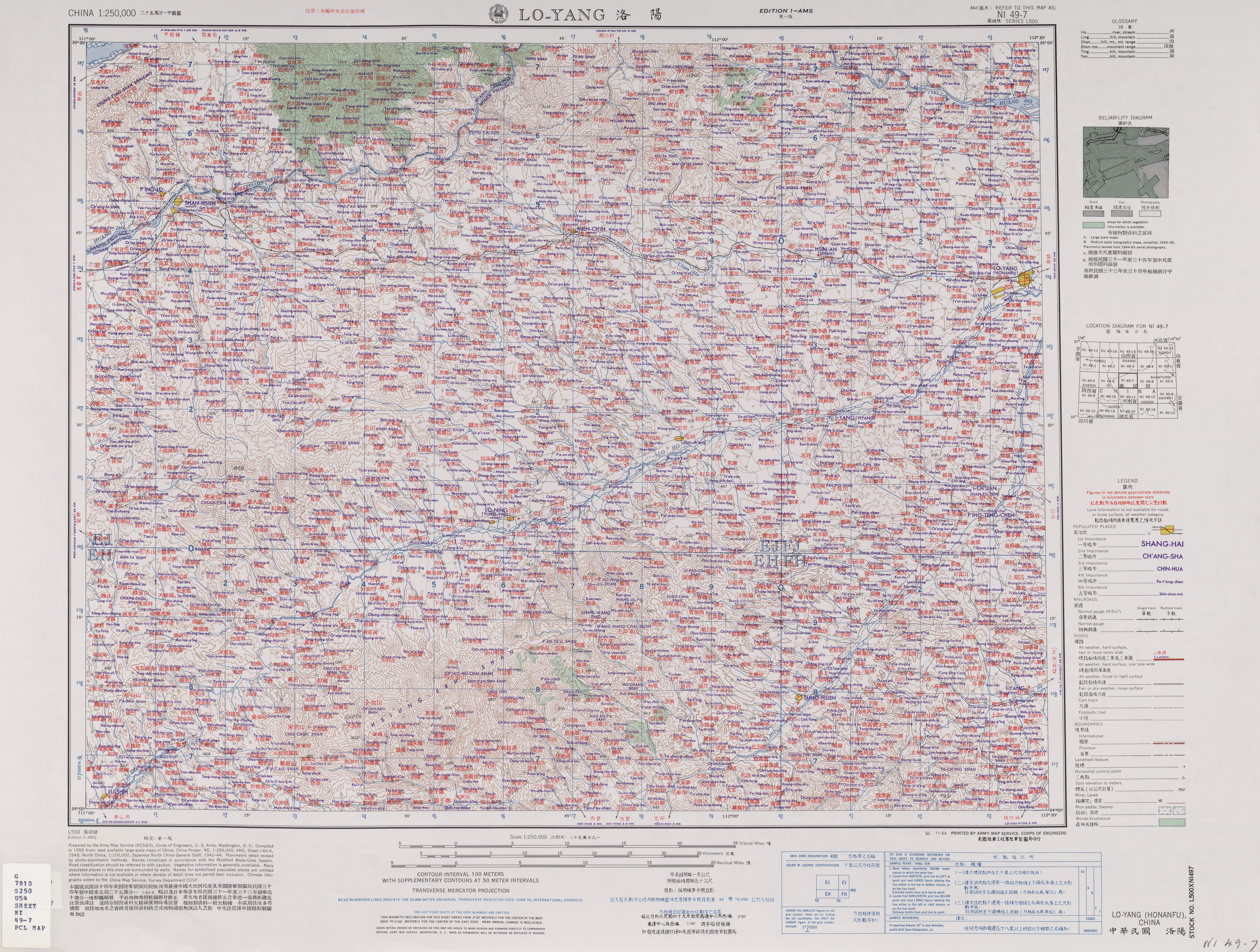
Map including Luoyang (labeled as LO-YANG (HONANFU) 洛陽) (AMS, 1955)

The prefecture-level city of Luoyang administers 7 districts and 7 counties:

- Districts
  - Jianxi District
  - Xigong District
  - Laocheng District
  - Chanhe Hui District
  - Luolong District
  - Yanshi District
  - Mengjin District
- Defunct District
  - Jili District, now part of Mengjin District
- Counties
  - Xin'an County
  - Luoning County
  - Yiyang County
  - Yichuan County
  - Song County
  - Luanchuan County
  - Ruyang County

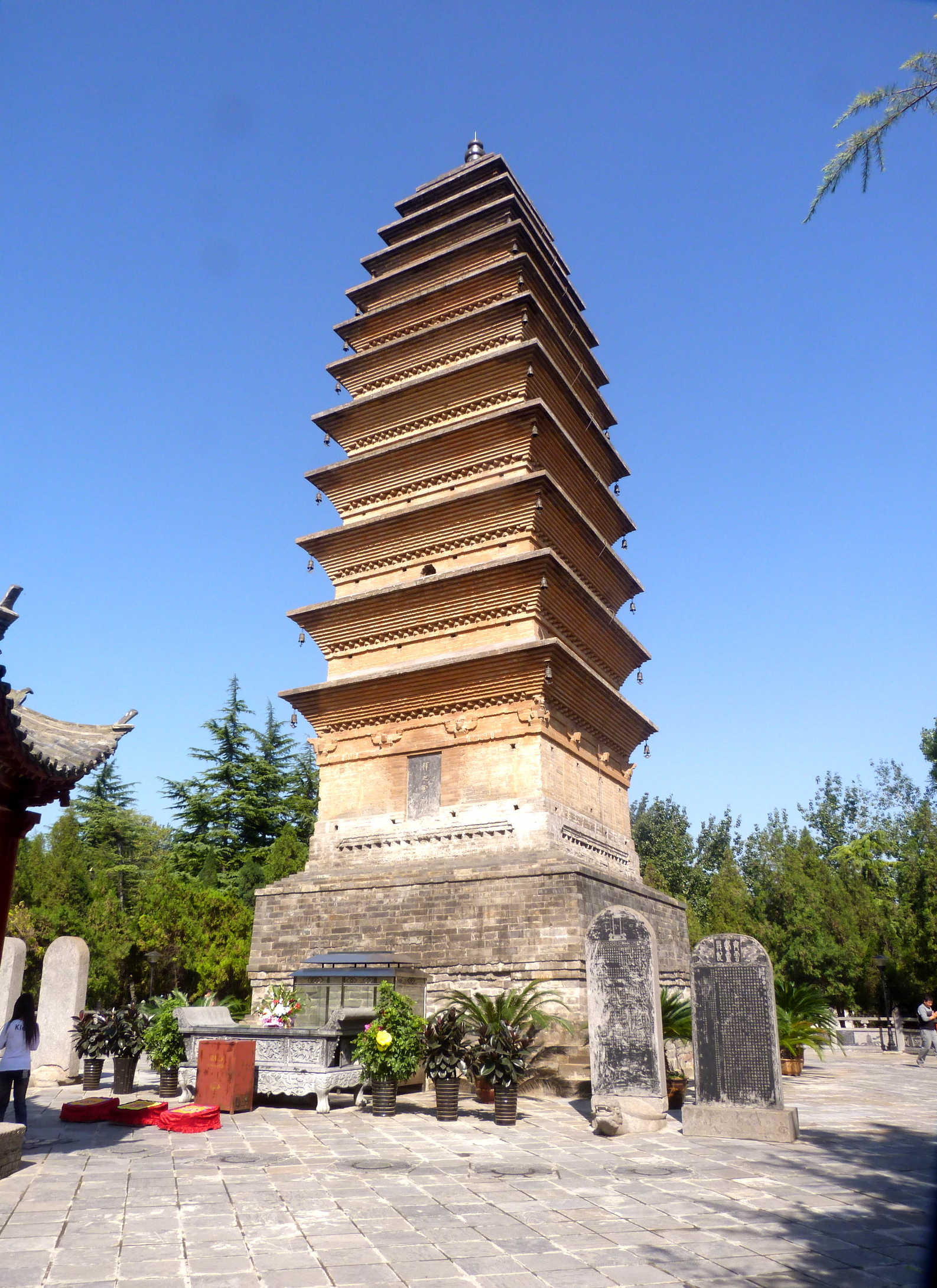
Qiyun Pagoda in White Horse Temple

During the 2010 census, the 5 "built-up" urban districts held a population of 1,857,003, making it the fourth-largest city in Henan. The entire area of Luoyang's municipal government held 6,549,941 inhabitants total.

Map
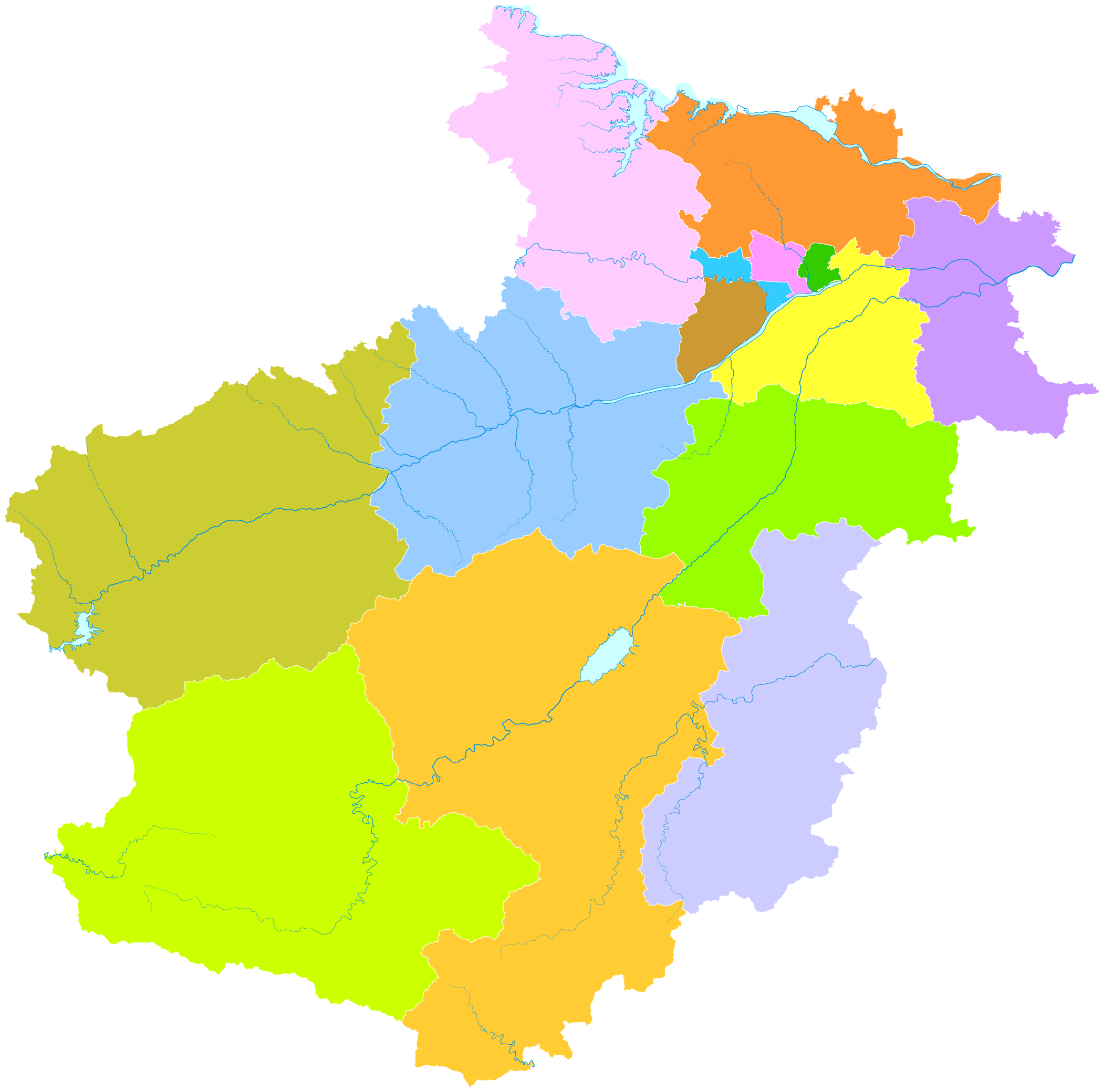

=== 2021 administrative reorganization ===
With the 2017 designation of Zhengzhou as a National Central City, Henan Province in 2020 proposed a new development plan for Zhengzhou Metropolitan Area, which called for the development of Luoyang as a sub-central city. As part of this development, authorities decided to expand the urban area of Luoyang. This facilitated planning and coordinated use of resources and infrastructure in Luoyang, and allowed for better integration towards Zhengzhou, as Yanshi, Jili and Mengjin previously separated the Luoyang urban area from Zhengzhou.

On 28 March 2021, the central government approved an administrative reorganization of Luoyang city. Yanshi City was reorganized into an urban district (Yanshi District), while Jili District and Mengjin County were merged into Mengjin District. This reorganization effectively doubled the urban area of Luoyang.

== Geography ==
The countryside controlled by the municipal government includes more rugged land: mountains comprise 45.51% of the total area; hills, 40.73%; and plains, 13.8%.

=== Climate ===
Luoyang has a highly continental dry-winter humid subtropical climate (Köppen climate classification: Cwa). Extremes since 1951 have ranged from −18.2 °C (−1 °F) (unofficial record of −20 °C (−4 °F)) was on January 17, 1936) to 44.2 °C (112 °F).

Climate data for Luoyang (Yanshi District), elevation 190 m (620 ft), (1991–2020 normals, extremes 1951–)
Month	Jan	Feb	Mar	Apr	May	Jun	Jul	Aug	Sep	Oct	Nov	Dec	Year
Record high °C (°F)	20.2 (68.4)	28.0 (82.4)	33.0 (91.4)	38.5 (101.3)	41.9 (107.4)	43.4 (110.1)	42.0 (107.6)	41.7 (107.1)	40.3 (104.5)	35.2 (95.4)	30.5 (86.9)	24.4 (75.9)	43.4 (110.1)
Mean daily maximum °C (°F)	6.5 (43.7)	10.5 (50.9)	16.5 (61.7)	23.3 (73.9)	28.5 (83.3)	32.9 (91.2)	33.0 (91.4)	31.3 (88.3)	27.4 (81.3)	21.9 (71.4)	14.6 (58.3)	8.4 (47.1)	21.2 (70.2)
Daily mean °C (°F)	1.0 (33.8)	4.5 (40.1)	10.2 (50.4)	16.7 (62.1)	22.1 (71.8)	26.7 (80.1)	27.8 (82.0)	26.3 (79.3)	21.8 (71.2)	15.9 (60.6)	8.7 (47.7)	2.8 (37.0)	15.4 (59.7)
Mean daily minimum °C (°F)	−3.2 (26.2)	−0.4 (31.3)	4.9 (40.8)	10.7 (51.3)	16.2 (61.2)	21.3 (70.3)	23.7 (74.7)	22.4 (72.3)	17.4 (63.3)	11.2 (52.2)	4.1 (39.4)	−1.4 (29.5)	10.6 (51.0)
Record low °C (°F)	−19.5 (−3.1)	−19.1 (−2.4)	−9.9 (14.2)	−3.0 (26.6)	1.9 (35.4)	9.2 (48.6)	15.6 (60.1)	12.9 (55.2)	6.9 (44.4)	−2.4 (27.7)	−8.4 (16.9)	−18.5 (−1.3)	−19.5 (−3.1)
Average precipitation mm (inches)	7.7 (0.30)	10.3 (0.41)	19.4 (0.76)	33.5 (1.32)	49.0 (1.93)	64.6 (2.54)	113.9 (4.48)	95.9 (3.78)	69.4 (2.73)	37.1 (1.46)	24.4 (0.96)	5.1 (0.20)	530.3 (20.87)
Average precipitation days	3.5	3.9	4.9	5.6	7.3	7.7	10.4	10.0	8.7	6.5	5.2	2.8	76.5
Average snowy days	3.7	3.2	1.0	0.2	0	0	0	0	0	0	0.9	2.4	11.4
Average relative humidity (%)	59	58	55	58	59	59	73	76	72	68	67	60	64
Mean monthly sunshine hours	133.6	141.5	177.3	204.7	220.4	204.4	182.5	176.7	153.3	151.3	145.7	146.4	2,037.8
Percentage possible sunshine	43	45	48	52	51	47	42	43	42	44	47	48	46
Source 1: China Meteorological Administration
Source 2: Weather China data.ac.cn

Climate data for Mengjin, elevation 329 m (1,079 ft), (1991–2020 normals, extremes 1951–present)
Month	Jan	Feb	Mar	Apr	May	Jun	Jul	Aug	Sep	Oct	Nov	Dec	Year
Record high °C (°F)	20.5 (68.9)	26.7 (80.1)	32.3 (90.1)	38.7 (101.7)	40.5 (104.9)	43.7 (110.7)	41.5 (106.7)	41.0 (105.8)	37.7 (99.9)	34.3 (93.7)	29.3 (84.7)	23.9 (75.0)	43.7 (110.7)
Mean daily maximum °C (°F)	5.4 (41.7)	9.1 (48.4)	15.0 (59.0)	21.9 (71.4)	27.1 (80.8)	31.3 (88.3)	31.3 (88.3)	29.7 (85.5)	25.8 (78.4)	20.5 (68.9)	13.5 (56.3)	7.5 (45.5)	19.8 (67.7)
Daily mean °C (°F)	0.5 (32.9)	3.8 (38.8)	9.3 (48.7)	15.8 (60.4)	21.2 (70.2)	25.6 (78.1)	26.6 (79.9)	25.1 (77.2)	20.9 (69.6)	15.4 (59.7)	8.5 (47.3)	2.5 (36.5)	14.6 (58.3)
Mean daily minimum °C (°F)	−3.1 (26.4)	−0.2 (31.6)	4.8 (40.6)	10.6 (51.1)	15.9 (60.6)	20.6 (69.1)	22.8 (73.0)	21.7 (71.1)	17.0 (62.6)	11.3 (52.3)	4.6 (40.3)	−1.2 (29.8)	10.4 (50.7)
Record low °C (°F)	−17.2 (1.0)	−15.7 (3.7)	−8.2 (17.2)	−2.4 (27.7)	4.6 (40.3)	10.0 (50.0)	15.4 (59.7)	11.7 (53.1)	5.7 (42.3)	−1.9 (28.6)	−11.7 (10.9)	−13.5 (7.7)	−17.2 (1.0)
Average precipitation mm (inches)	9.3 (0.37)	12.5 (0.49)	23.0 (0.91)	40.3 (1.59)	53.4 (2.10)	68.6 (2.70)	123.4 (4.86)	100.4 (3.95)	88.9 (3.50)	43.3 (1.70)	27.0 (1.06)	6.3 (0.25)	596.4 (23.48)
Average precipitation days (≥ 0.1 mm)	3.8	4.3	5.7	6.1	7.3	7.8	10.9	10.3	9.2	6.9	5.5	3.2	81
Average snowy days	4.3	4.0	1.9	0.2	0	0	0	0	0	0	1.5	3.0	14.9
Average relative humidity (%)	53	54	54	56	57	59	75	78	72	64	60	53	61
Mean monthly sunshine hours	142.3	144.6	182.1	213.0	227.9	206.8	177.3	177.7	159.9	162.3	153.3	158.4	2,105.6
Percentage possible sunshine	45	46	49	54	52	48	41	43	43	47	50	52	48
Source: China Meteorological Administration

== Culture ==
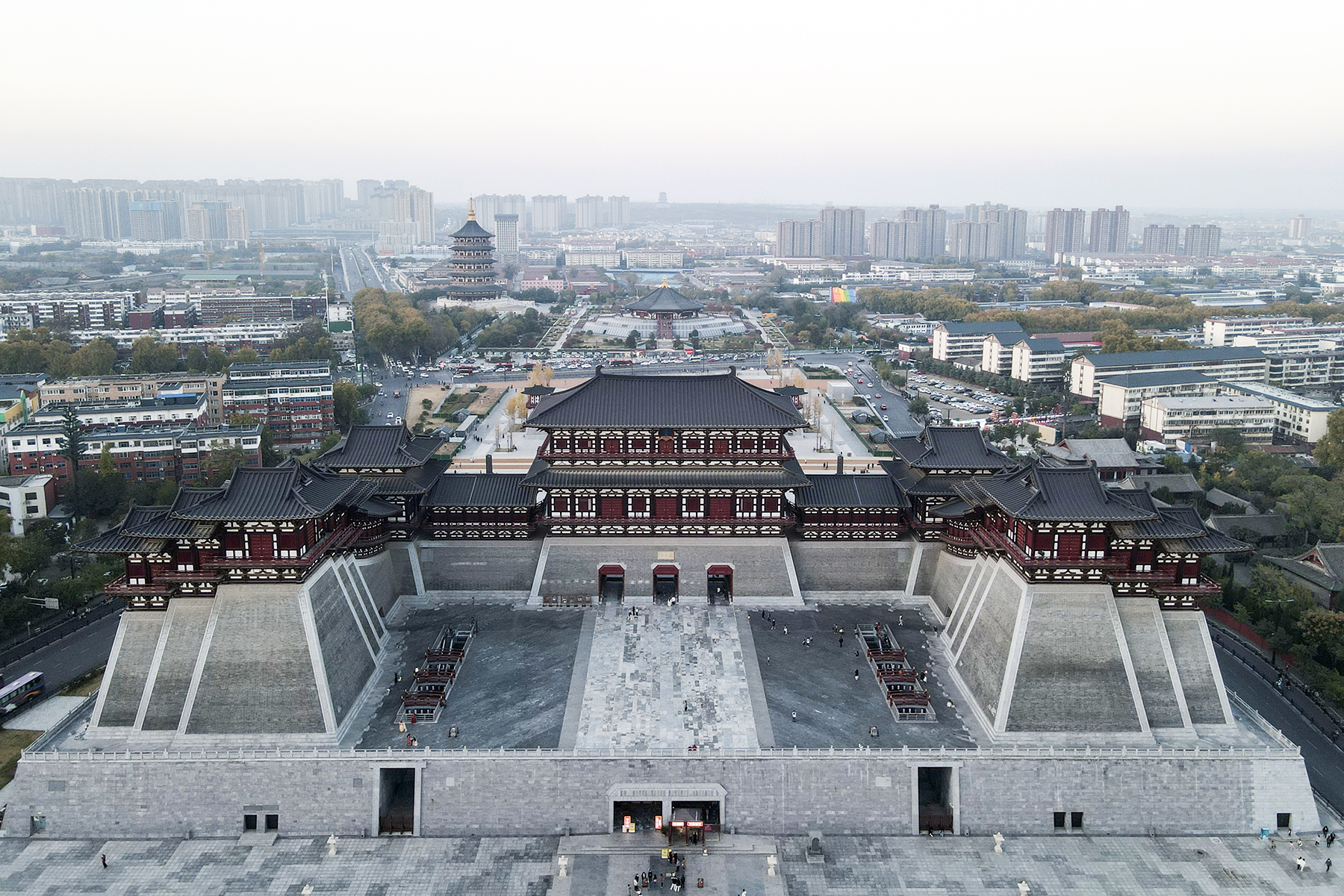
Museum of the site of Yingtian Gate, with recreations of Bright Hall (明堂) and Heaven Hall (天堂) rebuilt in the Tang dynasty style behind it.

Sites

Guanlin Temple in May 2007

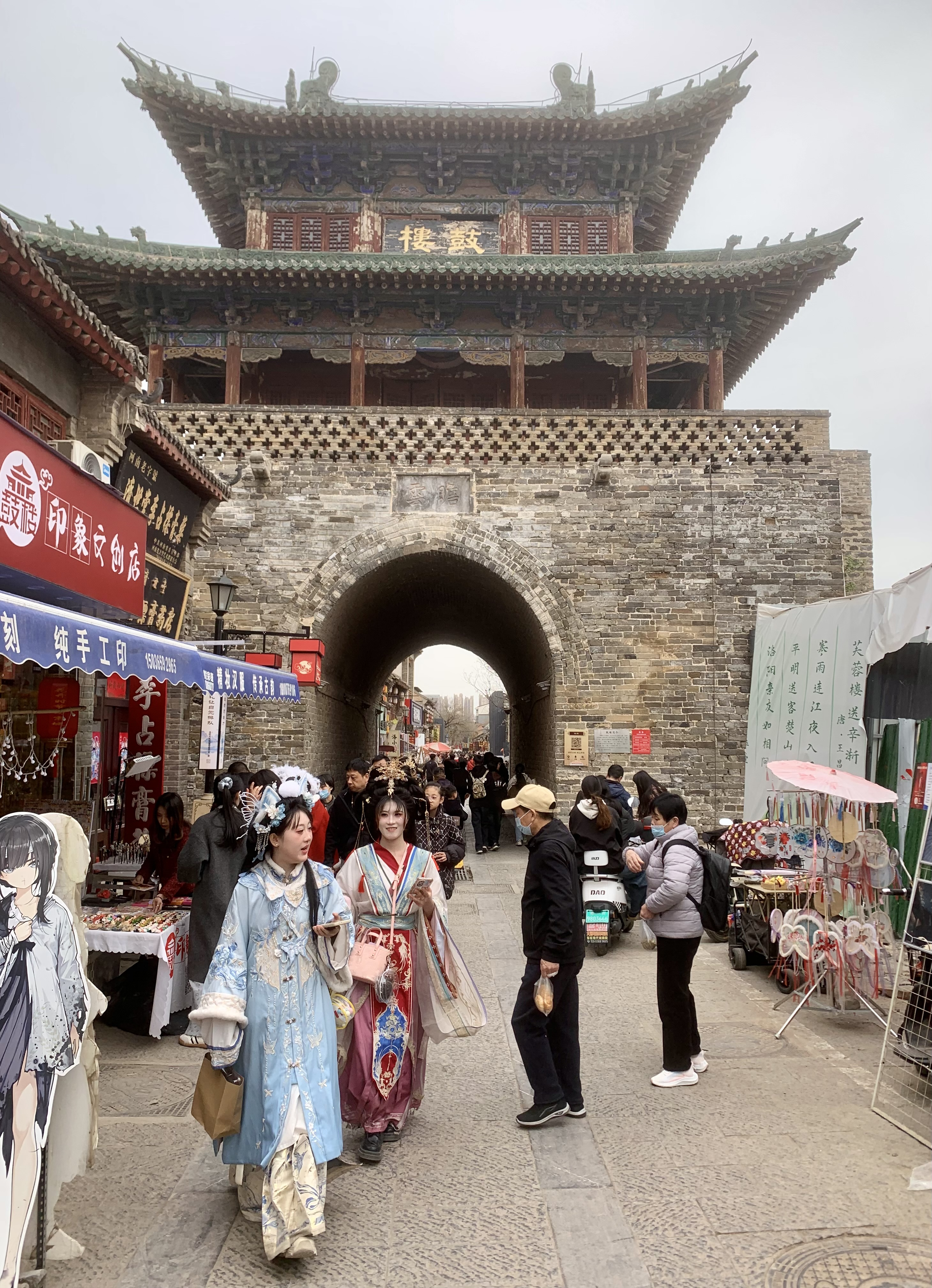
Drum tower in the old city

The Luoyang Museum (established 1958) features relics dating back to the Xia, Shang, and Zhou dynasties. The total number of exhibits on display is 1,700.

The Gaocheng Astronomical Observatory (also known as the Dengfeng Observatory or the Tower of Chou Kong) stands 80 km (50 mi) south-east of Luoyang. It was constructed in 1276 during the Yuan dynasty by Guo Shoujing as a gnomon for "the measurement of the sun's shadow". Prior to the Jesuit China Missions, it was used for establishing the summer and winter solstices in traditional Chinese astronomy.

Luoyang is the foundation of Confucianism, the birth of Taoism, the first transmission of Buddhism, the formation of metaphysics, and the origin of neo-Confucianism. All kinds of cultural thoughts are integrated here. The compass, paper making and printing among the four great inventions of ancient China were born here. Luoyang is the cultural root and ancestral lineage of the global Chinese, more than 100 million Hakka ancestral home in the world, 70% of China's clan name originated here, Heluo culture represented by "Hetu Luoshu" is the ancestral source of Chinese civilization.

Botany

Luoyang is celebrated for the cultivation of peonies, its city flower. Since 1983, Luoyang hosts the annual National Peony Fair (牡丹花会) and is the birthplace of the "Luoyang Water Banquet" (洛阳水席), a 24-course culinary tradition. More than 19 million tourists visited Luoyang during the 2014 festival.

=== Archaeological Site Conservation Mobile Lab ===
The Luoyang Municipal Institute of Archaeology operates a mobile laboratory for the on-site conservation of artifacts during excavations. This vehicle is equipped with tools for emergency stabilization, cleaning, and preliminary analysis of unearthed objects, particularly fragile organic materials and metals, allowing for immediate intervention before transfer to a full conservation facility.

== Cuisine ==
Luoyang Water Banquet: A traditional dish of Luoyang, renowned for its unique cooking techniques and rich combination of dishes.

Luoyang Beef Soup: Made with beef, carefully stewed to create a broth, and authentic beef.

Luoyang Roasted Chicken: Made with free-range chickens, it undergoes multiple processes including marinating, frying, and stewing, resulting in tender, juicy, and fragrant meat.

Potstickers: Originating in the Northern Song Dynasty, potstickers are very popular in Luoyang. The potstickers are very beautiful, with a bright color, and they are crispy on the outside and tender on the inside, with a crispy and soft texture.

Luoyang "No-Flipping Soup": This is a rich broth made with pork bones, chicken bones, mutton, and other ingredients, then topped with vermicelli, bean curd sheets, and shredded tofu. Its unique feature is that the soup is drunk without stirring the bowl, hence the name "No-Flipping Soup."

Fermented Noodle Soup: Made with noodles and a hot and sour broth The noodles have a smooth and chewy texture, and a hot and sour flavor.

== Transportation ==
=== Subway ===
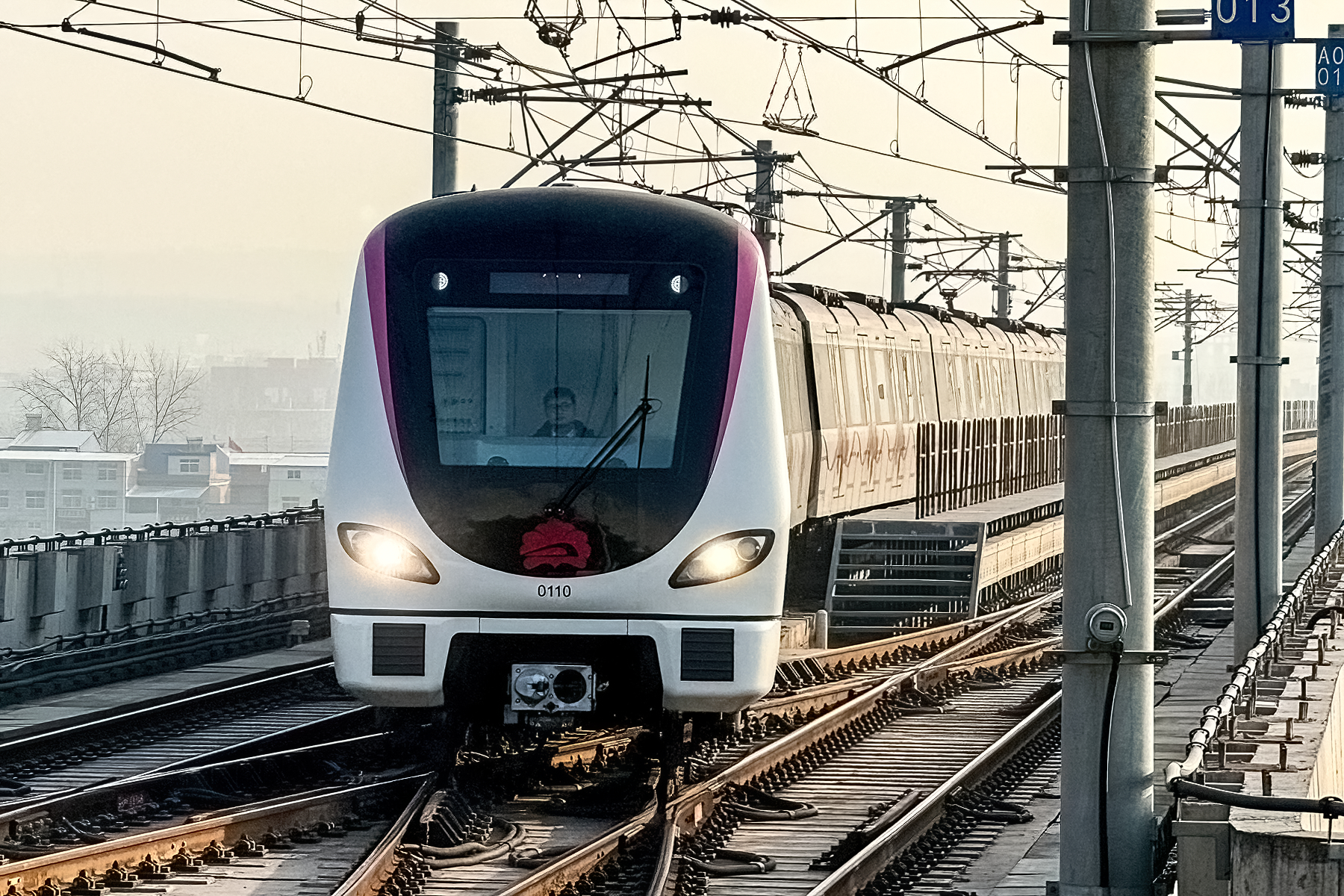
A train of Luoyang Subway Line 1

Luoyang Rail Transit currently has two lines. Line 1 was completed and opened to traffic on 28 March 2021, and Phase I of Line 2 was completed and opened to traffic at the end of 2021. Luoyang has also become the first non-provincial capital city in central and western China to have a subway.

== See also ==
- Roman Catholic Diocese of Luoyang
- Silk Road

Preceded by Fenghao	Primary capital of China; 771–256 BC	Succeeded by — then Xianyang
Preceded by Xianyang then —	Primary capital of China; 202–200 BC	Succeeded by Chang'an
Preceded by Chang'an	Primary capital of China; AD 25–190	Succeeded by — then Chang'an
Preceded by Chang'an	Primary capital of China; AD 196	Succeeded by Xuchang
