= Laocheng, Luoyang =

Laocheng 老城区
- District
- Interactive map of Laocheng
- Coordinates: 34°42′39″N 112°29′48″E
- Country: People's Republic of China
- Province: Henan
- Prefecture-level city: Luoyang

Area
  - Total: 57 km^{2} (22 sq mi)

Population (2010)
  - Total: 197,800
  - Density: 3,500/km^{2} (9,000/sq mi)
- Time zone: UTC+8 (China Standard)
- Postal code: 471000

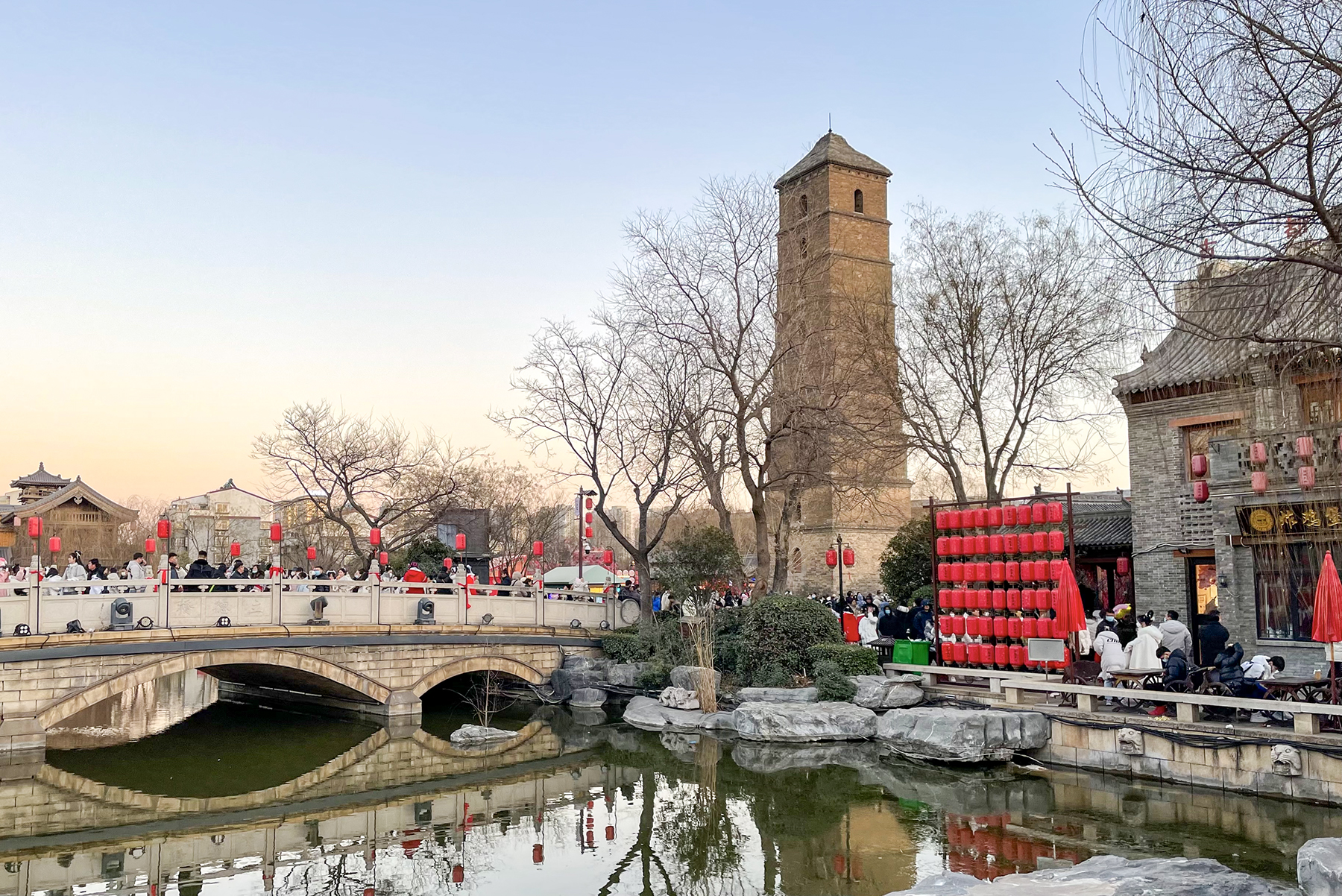
Luoyi Ancient City in Laocheng

Laocheng (Chinese: 老城; pinyin: Lǎochéng; lit. 'old city') is a district of Luoyang in Henan, China.

Laocheng District's history could be retrospect to BC 1042 the Xizhou Dynasty. Lao in Chinese means "old", and cheng means "city, downtown", so Laocheng's original meaning is "old downtown". Laocheng is a historical district and a cultural and business center.

== Administrative divisions ==
As of 2012, this district is divided to 6 subdistricts.

Subdistricts

- Xibeiyu Subdistrict (西北隅街道)
- Xinanyu Subdistrict (西南隅街道)
- Dongbeiyu Subdistrict (东北隅街道)
- Dongnanyu Subdistrict (东南隅街道),
- Xiguan Subdistrict (西关街道)
- Nanguanlu Subdistrict (南关路街道)
