= Xigong, Luoyang =

Xigong 西工区
- District
- Location in Henan
- Coordinates: 34°39′36″N 112°25′41″E
- Country: People's Republic of China
- Province: Henan
- Prefecture-level city: Luoyang

Area
  - Total: 56 km^{2} (22 sq mi)

Population (2019)
  - Total: 367,500
  - Density: 6,600/km^{2} (17,000/sq mi)
- Time zone: UTC+8 (China Standard)
- Postal code: 471000

Xigong District (Chinese: 西工区; pinyin: Xīgōng Qū) is a district of the city of Luoyang, Henan province, China.

Xigong District is located in the center of Luoyang City, and is the economy, finance and business center of the city.

== Administrative divisions ==
As of 2012, this district is divided to 8 subdistricts and 2 townships.

Subdistricts

- Wangcheng Road Subdistrict (王城路街道)
- Xigong Subdistrict (西工街道)
- Kaixuandonglu Subdistrict (凯旋东路街道)
- Jinguyuan Subdistrict (金谷园街道)
- Daobeilu Subdistrict (道北路街道)
- Manglinglu Subdistrict (邙岭路街道)
- Hantunlu Subdistrict (汉屯路街道)
- Tanggonglu Subdistrict (唐宫路街道)

Townships

- Luobei Township (洛北乡)
- Hongshan Township (红山乡)
