= Twin pagodas =

Twin pagodas may refer to:

- Twin Pagoda Temple, in Taiyuan, Shanxi province, China
- Twin Pagodas in Suzhou, Jiangsu, China
- Twin Pagodas of Qingshou Temple, formerly standing in Beijing, China
- Twin Pagodas of Baisikou, in Helan County, Ningxia, China
