= Christ's Church, Jinyuan =

Church in Taiyuan, Shanxi, China

- 晋源基督教堂
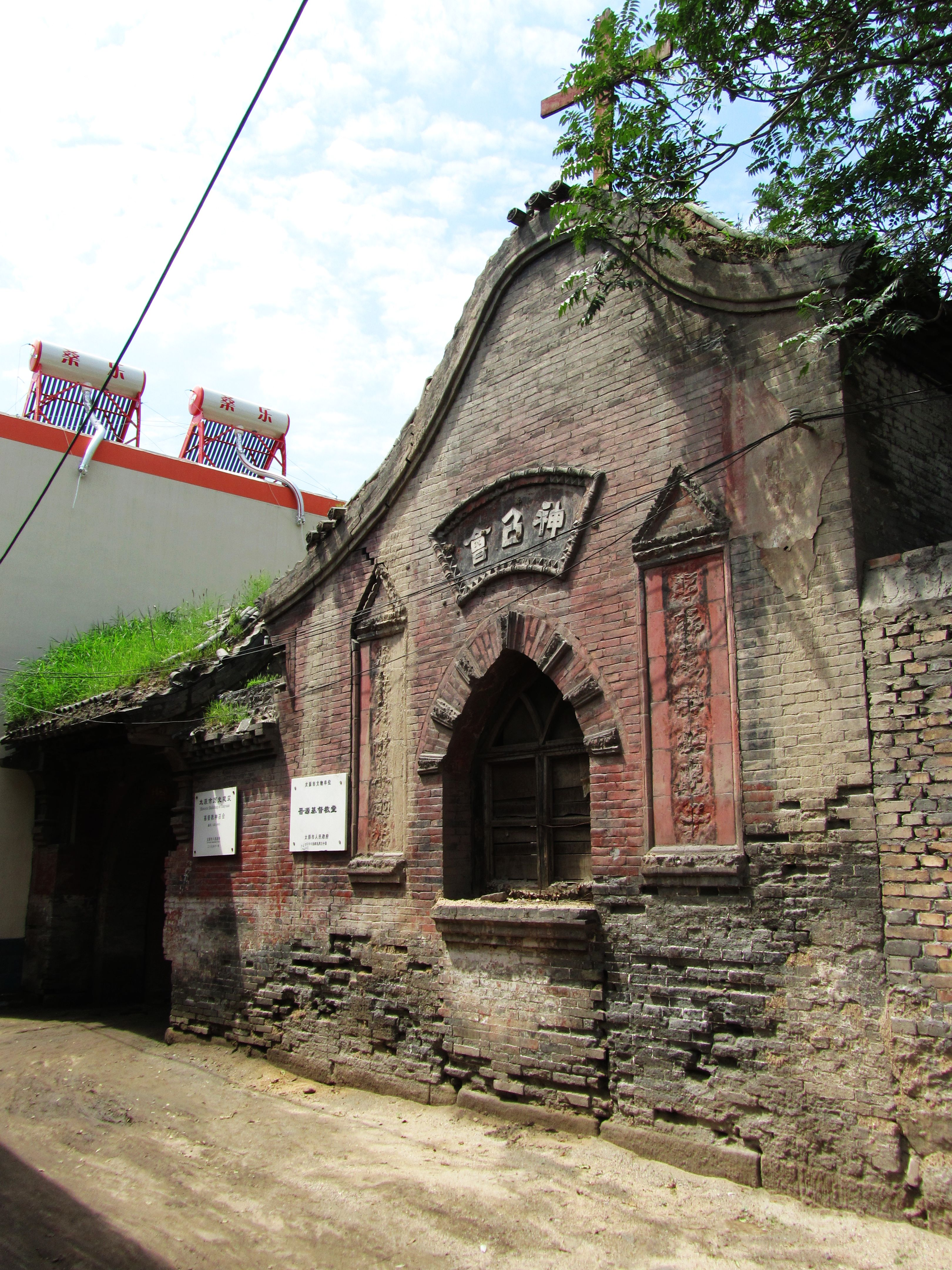
- Christ's Church, Jinyuan, in 2011

- Location in Shanxi
- 37°49′04″N 112°30′56″E
- Location: Jinyuan District, Taiyuan, Shanxi, China
- Denomination: Protestantism
- Previous denomination: Assemblies of God

History
- Status: Parish church
- Founded: 1914
- Founder: Nie Erde

Architecture
- Functional status: Active
- Architectural type: Church building

Specifications
- Materials: Granite

Chinese name
- Simplified Chinese: 晋源基督教堂
- Traditional Chinese: 晉源基督教堂
Transcriptions
Standard Mandarin
- Hanyu Pinyin: Jīnyuán Jīdūjiàotáng

Christ's Church, Jinyuan (Chinese: 晋源基督教堂) is a Protestant church located in Jinyuan District, Taiyuan, Shanxi, China.

== History ==
The church was built in 1914 by the American minister Nie Erde (聂尔德). It was added to Taiyuan's list of historical cultural heritage in 2009.
