= Shanxi Experimental Secondary School =

- 山西省实验中学
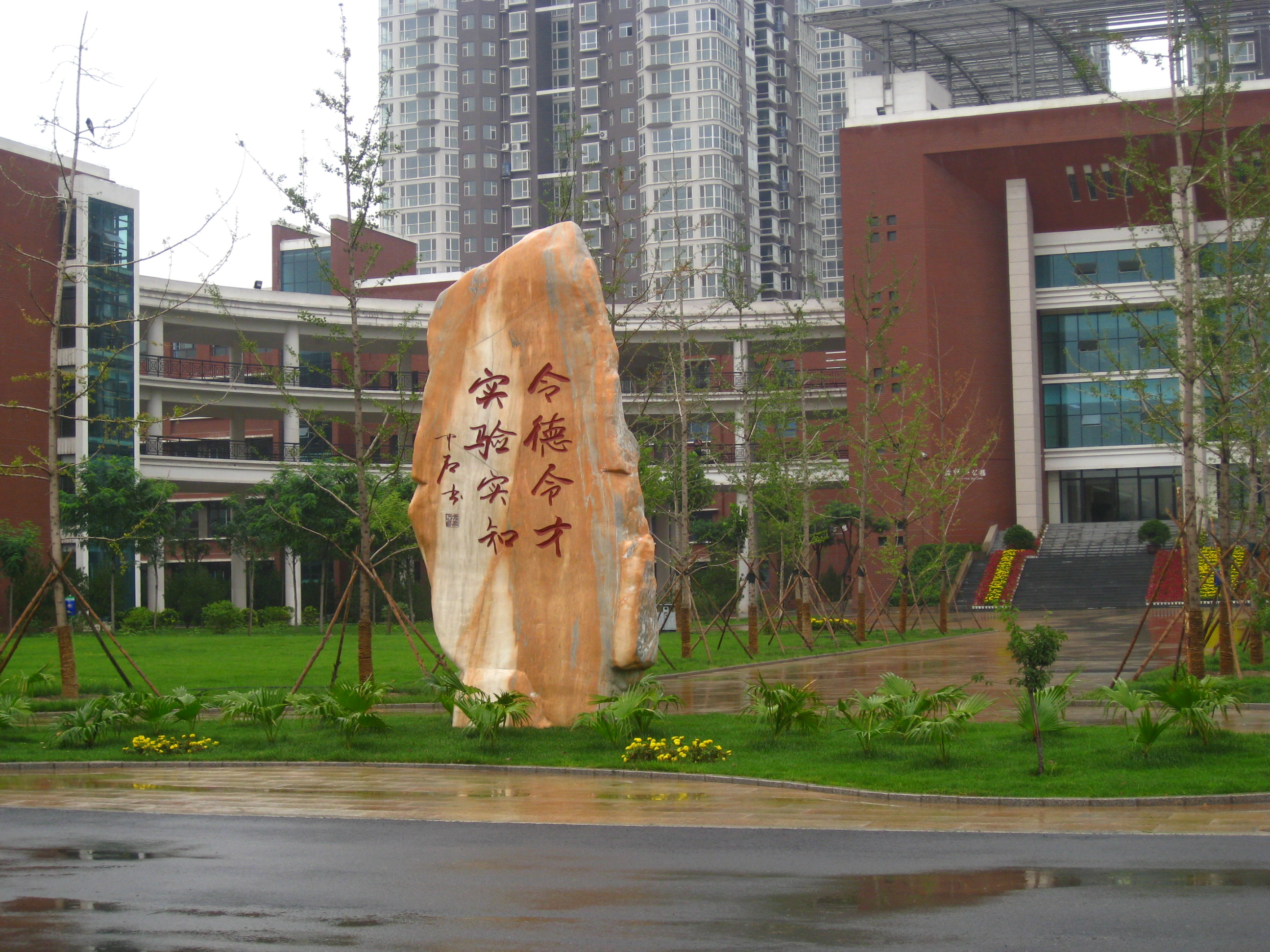
- Shanxi Experimental Secondary School new campus

Location
- 85 Jiefang Road (middle school); Taiyuan, Shanxi, 030002; China
- Coordinates: 37.7897°N 112.5453°E

Information
- Motto: 令德令才，实验实知。 (Only fine morality makes fine talent; only experiment makes true knowledge.)
- Founded: 1883
- Founder: Zhang Zhidong

Shanxi Experimental Secondary School (SESS) (Chinese: 山西省实验中学) is a public, co-educational day school in Taiyuan, Shanxi province. Founded as Ling Detang School in 1883 by Zhang Zhidong in response to manage severe corruption in Shanxi Province. SESS is the only official key middle school in Shanxi Province, directly administrated by Shanxi Department of Education.
