= Jinyuan, Taiyuan =

District in Taiyuan, Shanxi, China

Coordinates: 37°43′42″N 112°28′36″E

Jinyuan 晋源区
- District
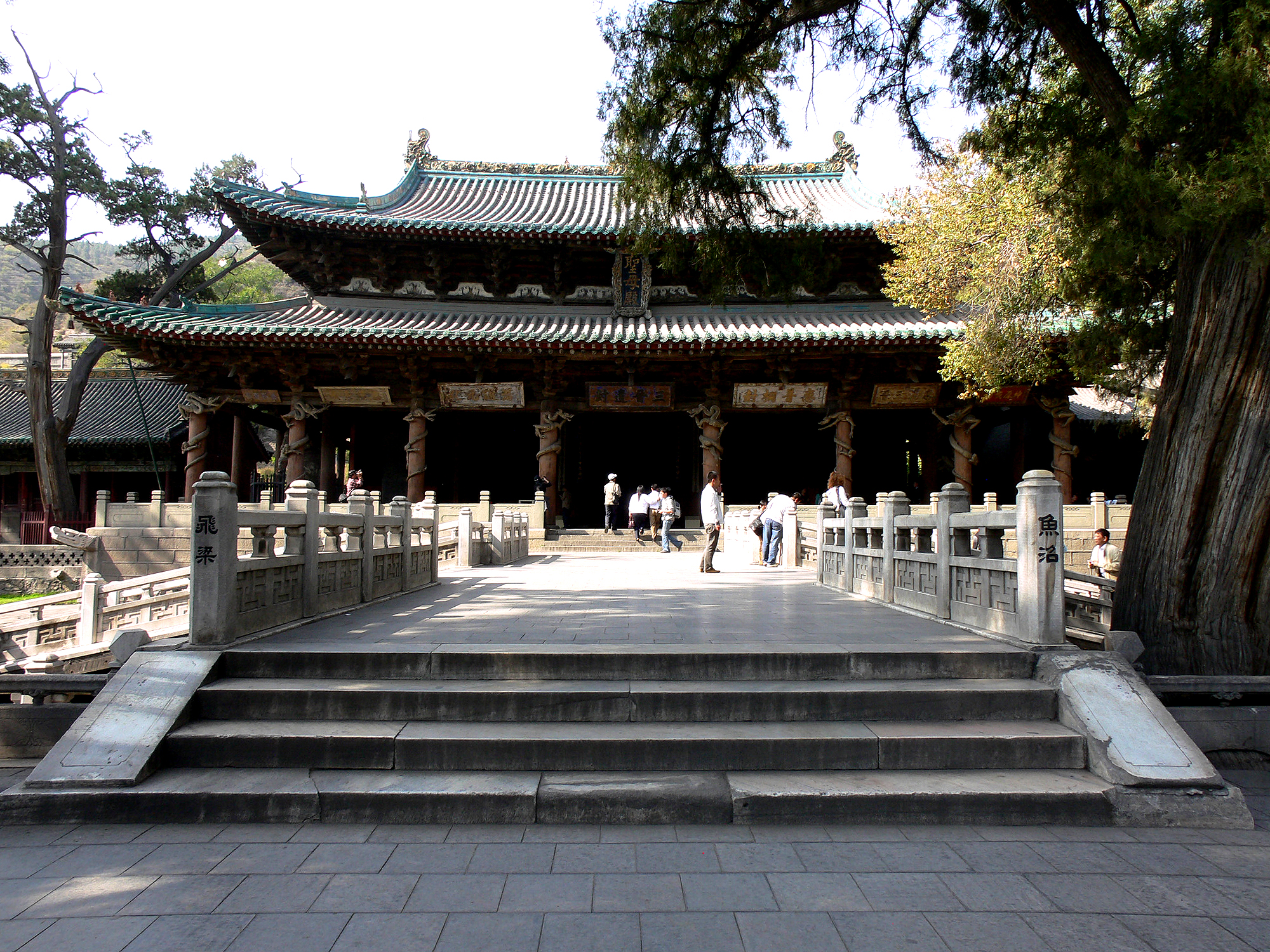
- Goddess Temple in Jinsi town

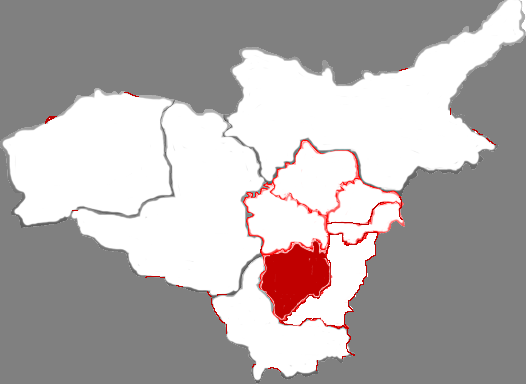
- Location in Taiyuan

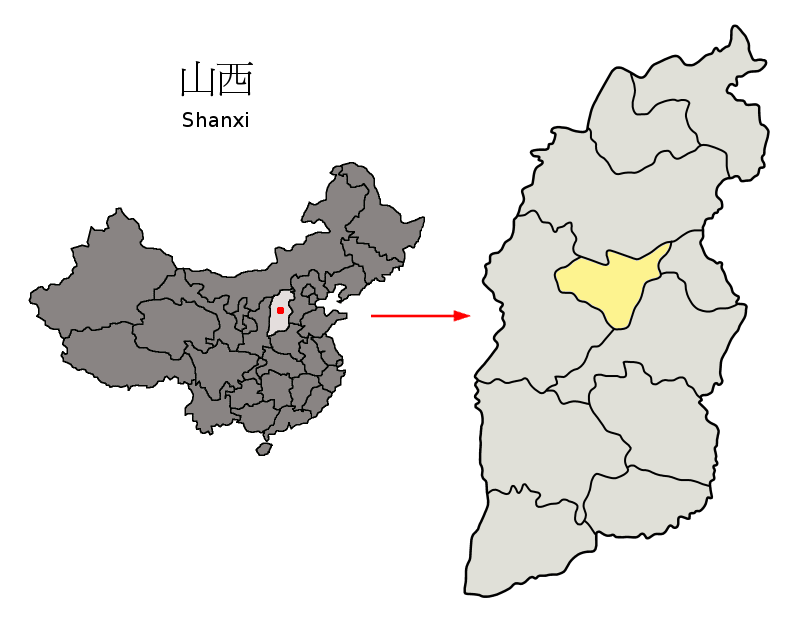
- Taiyuan in Shanxi
- Country: People's Republic of China
- Province: Shanxi
- Prefecture-level city: Taiyuan

Population (2020)
  - Total: 316,445
- Time zone: UTC+8 (China Standard)

Jinyuan District (simplified Chinese: 晋源区; traditional Chinese: 晉源區; pinyin: Jìnyuán Qū) is one of six districts of the prefecture-level city of Taiyuan, the capital of Shanxi Province, North China.

== See also ==
- Jinci, famous temple complex located in the district
