= Affiliated High School of Shanxi University =

School in Taiyuan, Shanxi, China

Coordinates: 37.814125°N 112.581893°E

- (China) Taiyuan, Shanxi Province

Information
- Type: Public, co-educational
- Headmaster: Liu Wei

The Affiliated High School of Shanxi University (Chinese: 山西大学附属中学) is a public, co-educational day school in Taiyuan, Shanxi province. It was founded in 1955.
