= Taiyuan =

Capital of Shanxi, China

Taiyuan 太原市
- Prefecture-level city
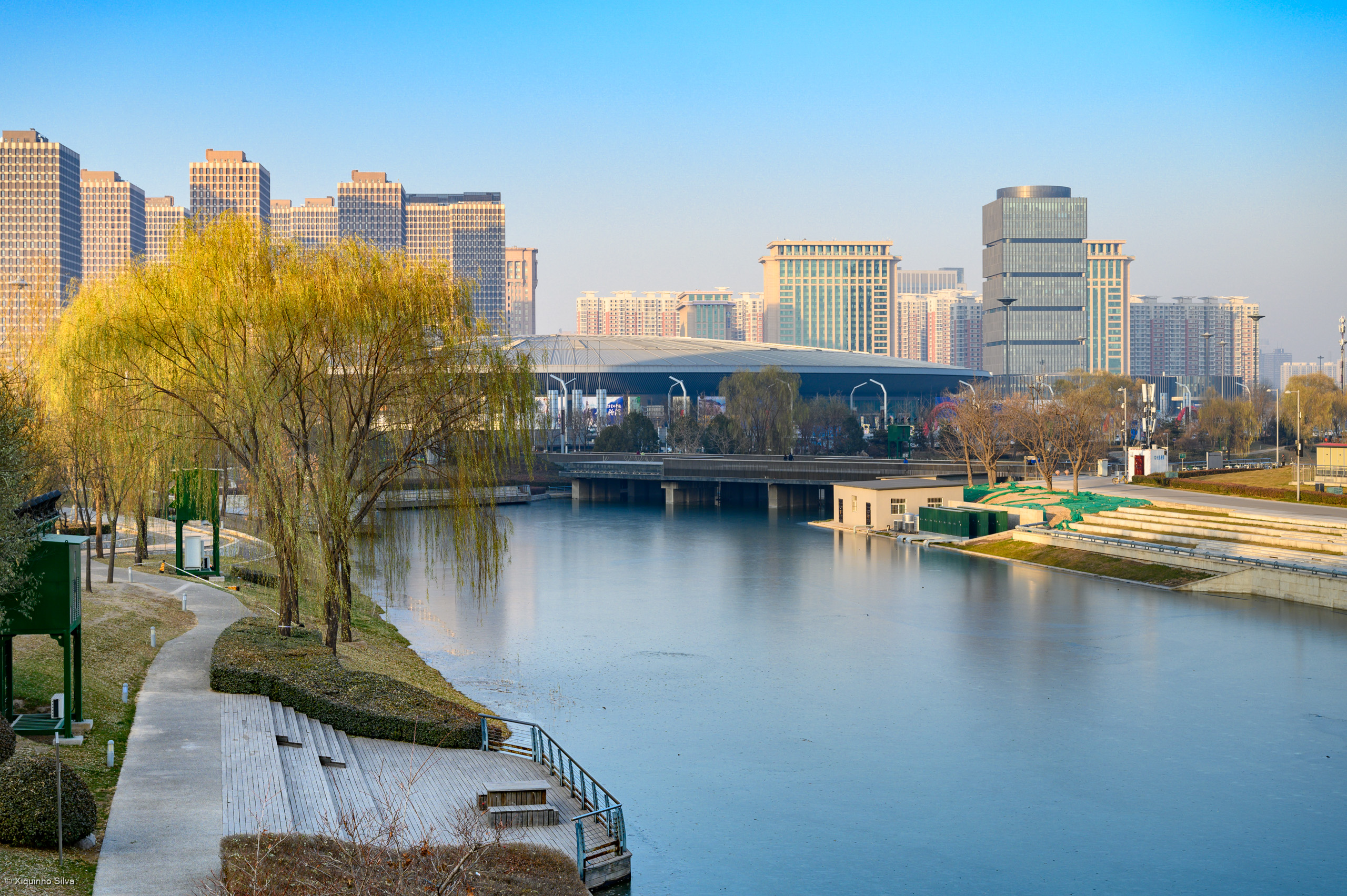
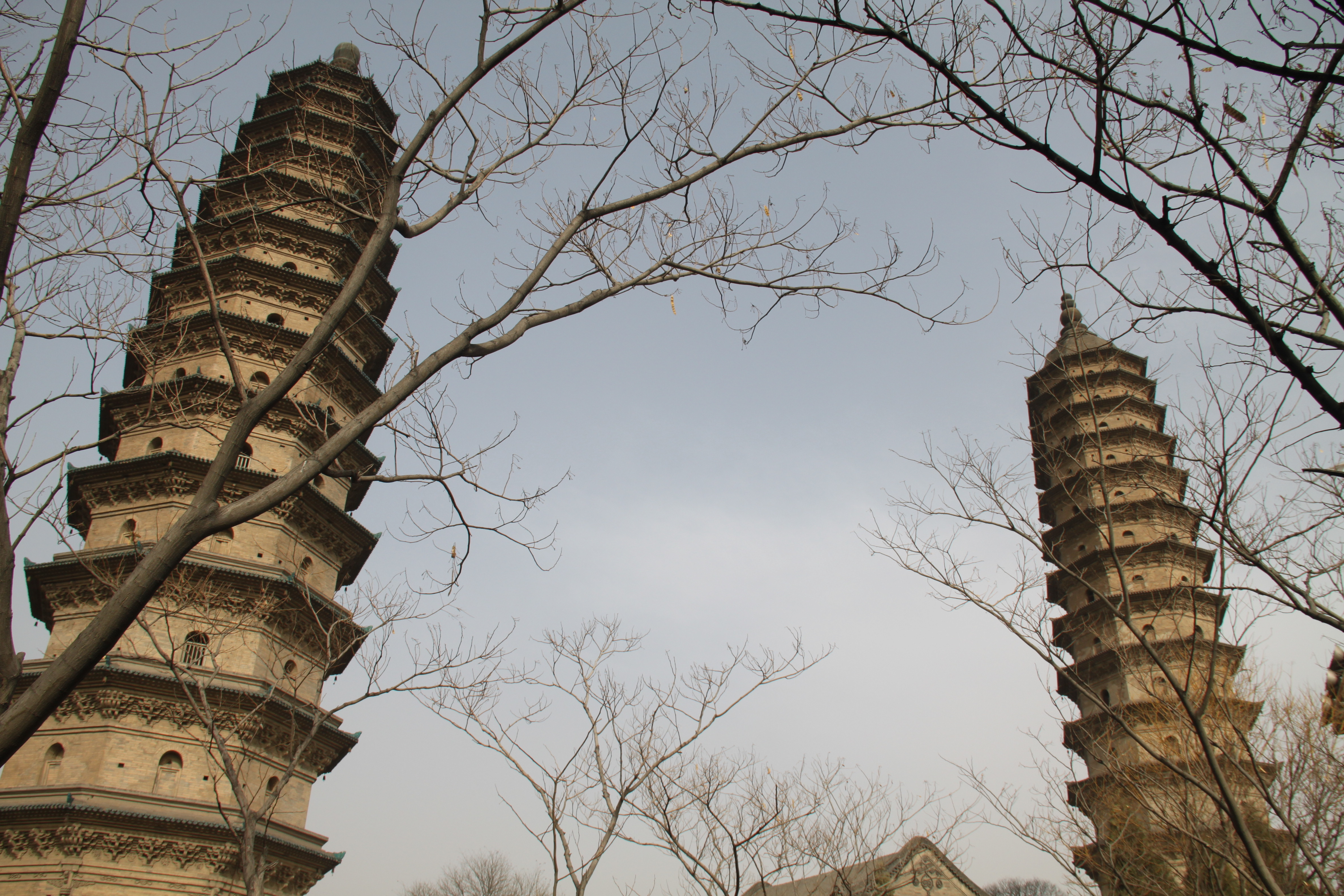
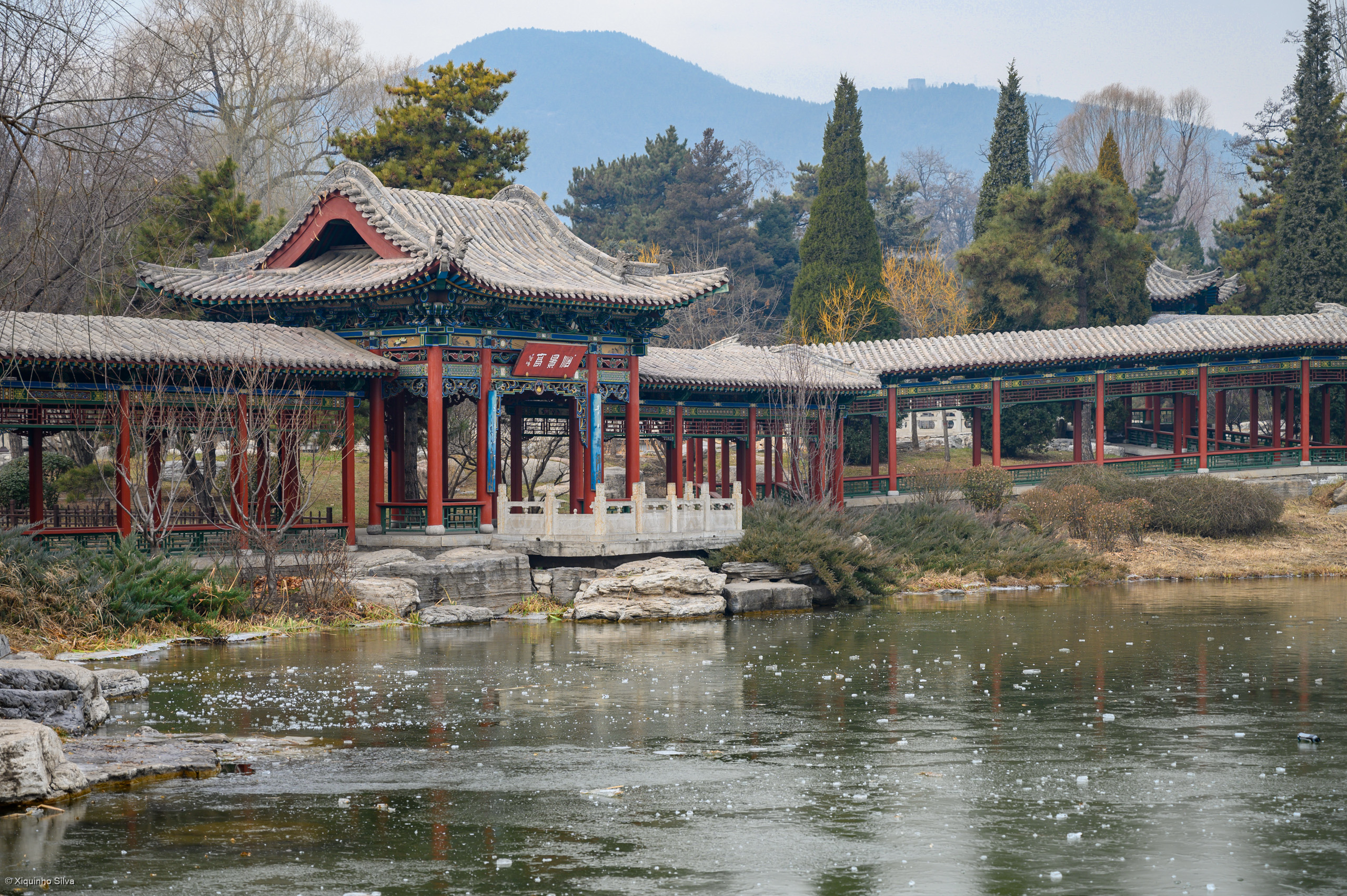
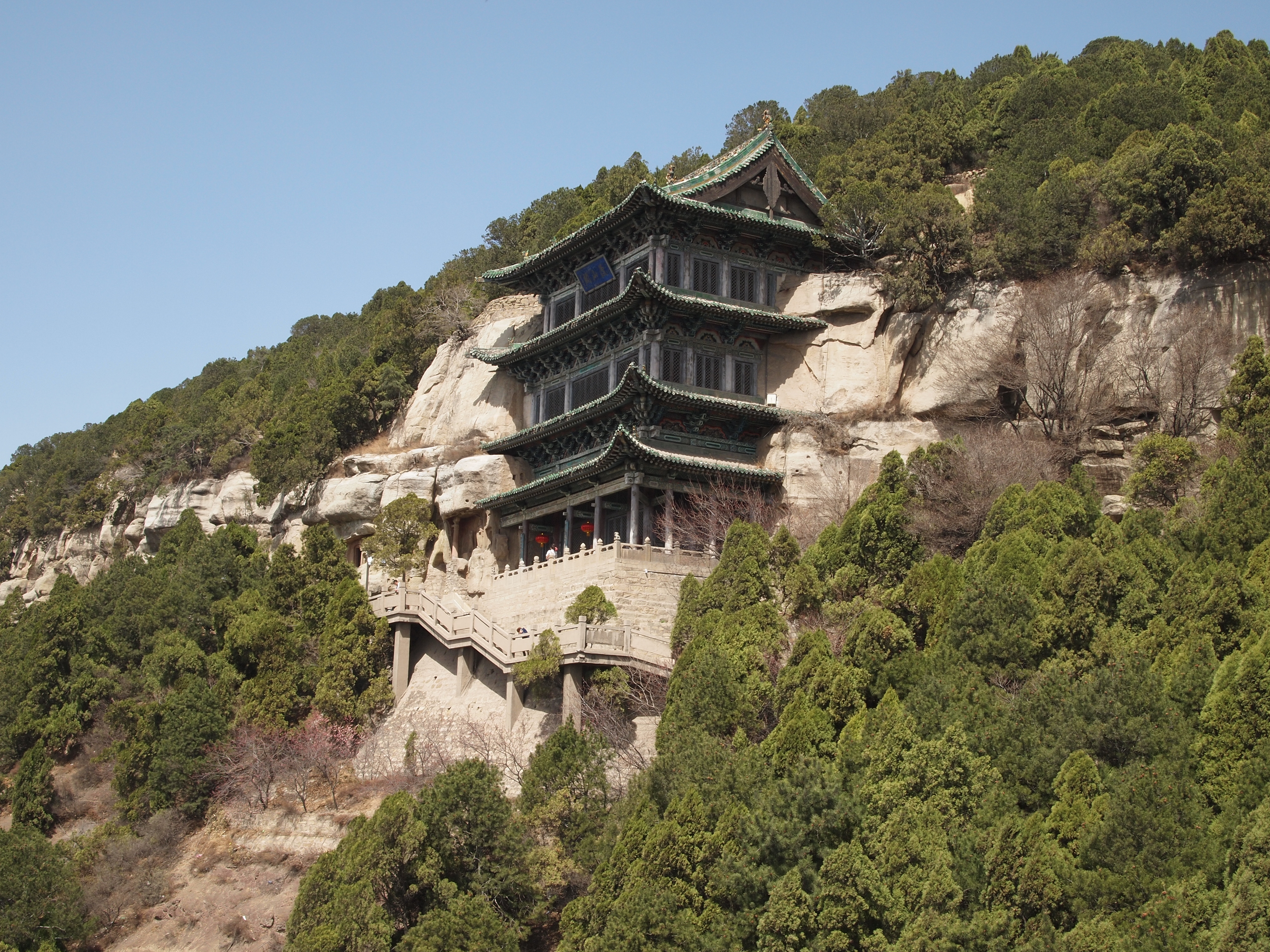
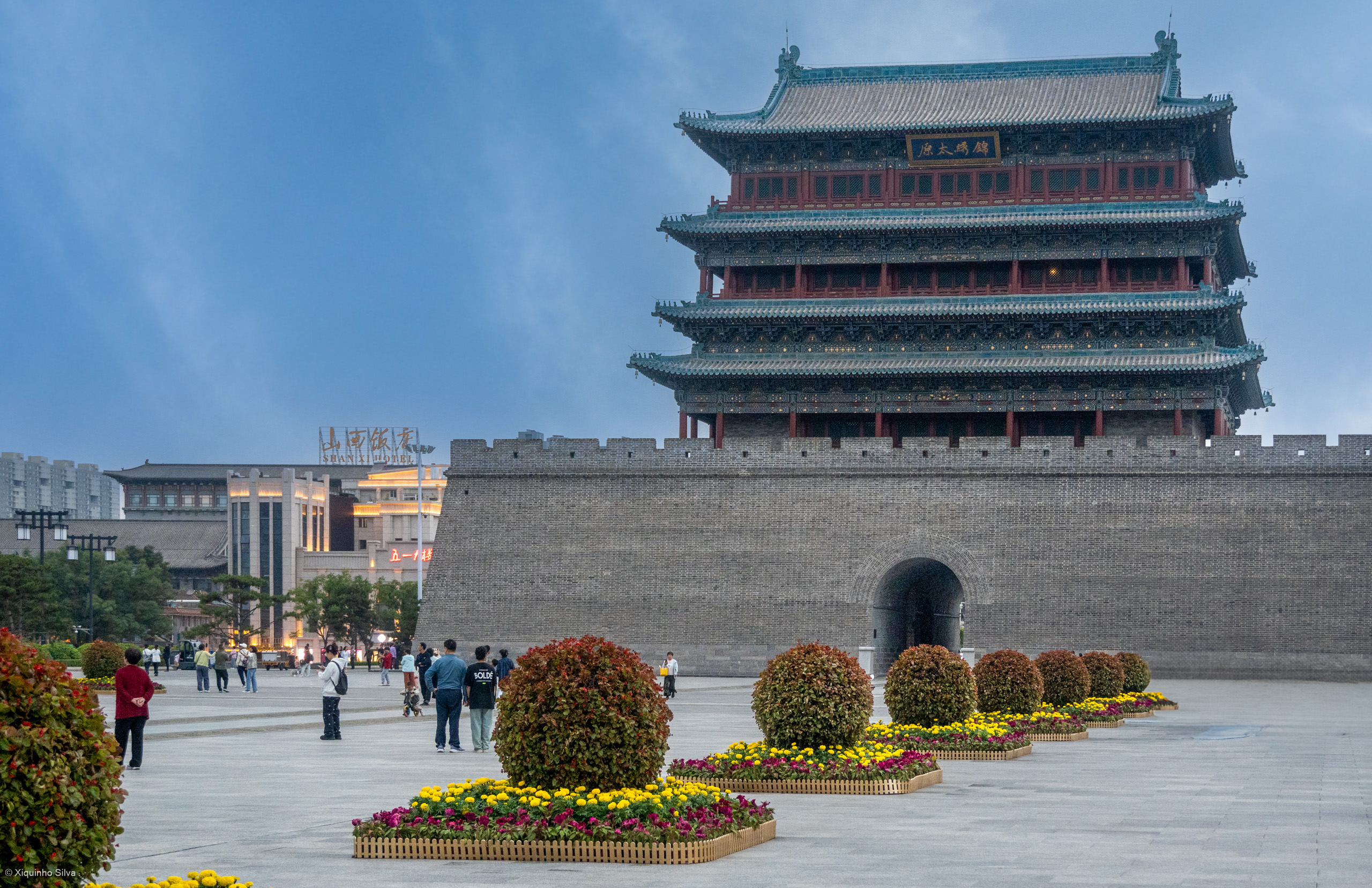
- Taiyuan skyline Twin Pagoda Temple Jinci Tianlongshan Grottoes Shouyi Gate
- Nicknames: Bīngzhōu (并州); Jìnyáng (晋阳); Dragon City (龙城)
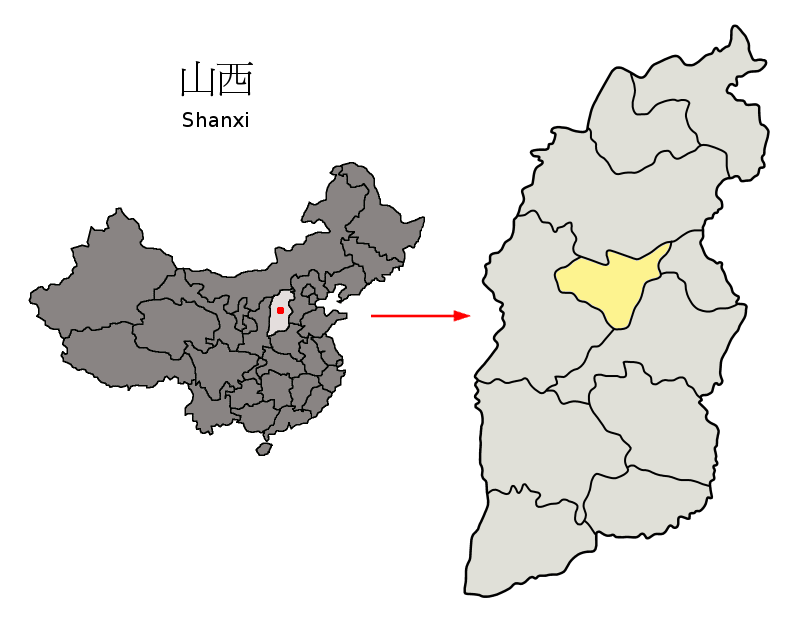
- Location of Taiyuan City jurisdiction in Shanxi

- Location of the city center in Shanxi Taiyuan (China)
- Coordinates (Taiyuan municipal government): 37°52′13″N 112°32′59″E
- Country: China
- Province: Shanxi
- Municipal seat: Xinghualing District
- Divisions: County-level divisions: 10, Township-level divisions: 83

Government
  - Type: Prefecture-level city
  - Body: Taiyuan Municipal People's Congress
  - CCP Secretary: Luo Qingyu
  - Congress Chairman: Wei Min
  - Mayor: Fan Zhaosen; Acting
  - CPPCC Chairman: Cao Xuecheng

Area
  - Prefecture-level city: 6,959 km^{2} (2,687 sq mi)
  - Urban: 1,460 km^{2} (560 sq mi)
  - Metro: 2,787 km^{2} (1,076 sq mi)
- Elevation: 800 m (2,600 ft)
- Highest elevation: 2,670 m (8,760 ft)
- Lowest elevation: 760 m (2,490 ft)

Population (2020 census)
  - Prefecture-level city: 5,305,061
  - Density: 762.3/km^{2} (1,974/sq mi)
  - Urban: 4,529,141
  - Urban density: 3,100/km^{2} (8,030/sq mi)
  - Metro: 5,433,659
  - Metro density: 1,950/km^{2} (5,050/sq mi)

GDP
  - Prefecture-level city: CN¥ 415 billion US$ 65.3 billion
  - Per capita: CN¥ 78,284; US$ 12,570
- Time zone: UTC+08:00 (China Standard)
- Postal code: 030000
- Area code: 351
- ISO 3166 code: CN-SX-01
- Vehicle registration: 晋A
- GaWC Global City level classification: Gamma -
- Major Nationalities: Han
- Administrative division code: 140100
- Website: taiyuan.gov.cn

Taiyuan
- "Taiyuan" in Chinese characters
- Chinese: 太原
- Literal meaning: "Great Plain"
Transcriptions
Standard Mandarin
- Hanyu Pinyin: Tàiyuán
- Bopomofo: ㄊㄞˋ ㄩㄢˊ
- Gwoyeu Romatzyh: Tayyuan
- Wade–Giles: Tʻai^{4}-yüan^{2}
- IPA: [tʰâɪ.ɥɛ̌n]
Yue: Cantonese
- Yale Romanization: Taai-yùhn
- Jyutping: Taai^{3}-jyun^{4}
- IPA: [tʰaj˧.jyn˩]
Southern Min
- Hokkien POJ: Thài-goân
Middle Chinese
- Middle Chinese: Thaj^{H}-ŋʉan

Taiyuan (Note: /ˌtaɪjuˈɑːn/; /ˈtaɪˈjwɛn/; Chinese: 太原; pinyin: Tàiyuán; Mandarin pronunciation: [tʰâɪ.ɥɛ̌n]; Jin Chinese pronunciation: [tʰai˦˥ ye˩˩]) is the capital of Shanxi, China. It is the political, economic, cultural, and international exchange center of the province, containing an industrial base focusing on energy and heavy chemicals. Throughout its long history, Taiyuan was the capital or provisional capital of many dynasties in China, hence the name Lóngchéng (龙城; The City of the Dragon).

As of 2021, the city governed six districts and three counties, with a total area of 6,988 square kilometers and a permanent population of 5,390,957.

Taiyuan is located roughly in the centre of Shanxi, with the Fen River flowing through the centre of the city.

== Etymology and names ==
The two Chinese characters of the city's name are 太 (tài, "great") and 原 (yuán, "plain"), referring to the location where the Fen River leaves the mountains and enters a relatively flat plain. Throughout its long history, the city had various names, including Bīngzhōu (并州) (from which its abbreviated single-character name Bīng (并) is derived), Jìnyáng (晋阳), and Lóngchéng (龙城).

During the Tang and subsequent Five Dynasties, the status of the city of Taiyuan was elevated to be the northern capital, hence the names Běidū (北都) and Běijīng (北京, different from present-day Beijing).

== History ==
Taiyuan is an ancient city with more than 2,500 years of urban history, dating back to 497 BC. It was the capital or secondary capital (陪都, 别都) of Zhao, Former Qin, Eastern Wei, Northern Qi, Northern Jin, Later Tang, Later Jin, Later Han, and Northern Han. Its strategic location and rich history make Taiyuan one of the economic, political, military, and cultural centers of northern China.

=== Pre-Qin dynasty history ===
From about 859 BC, the area around modern-day Taiyuan was occupied by the Rong people. In 662 BC, these were driven out by the Di people.

In 497 BC, the first ancient city of Jinyang was built around the southern Jinyuan district of present-day Taiyuan by Dong Anyu (董安于), who was a steward of Zhao Jianzi (赵鞅), an upper-level official of the state of Jin.

During the Battle of Jinyang in 453 BC, Zhi Yao diverted the flow of the Fen River to inundate the city of Jinyang, causing significant damage to the Zhao. Later, Zhao Xiangzi alerted the Wei and Han, who both decided to ally with the Zhao. On the night of 8 May 453 BC, Zhao troops broke the dams of the Fen River and let the river flood the Zhi armies, which they eventually annihilated, with help from the Wei and Han.

The partition of Jin happened in 403 BC, when the state of Jin, then a strong power in northern China, was divided into the three smaller states of Han, Zhao, and Wei. This event is the watershed between the Spring and Autumn and Warring States periods in Chinese history.

=== Qin dynasty ===
In 248 BC, the state of Qin attacked Zhao under General Meng'ao and obtained the area around Jinyang. Qin set up the Commandery of Taiyuan (太原郡), with the city of Jinyang as its administrative center. Although the name "Taiyuan" had appeared in historic records before, potentially referring to different regions in present-day southern and central Shanxi, this was the first time the name was officially used to refer to what is today Taiyuan.

Between 229 and 228 BC, the Qin general Li Xin led two armies from the cities of Taiyuan and Yunzhong to attack Zhao's northern commandery of Dai. Three months after General Li Mu's death, Wang Jian, Li Xin, and Qiang Lei conquered Zhao.

In 221 BC, Qin conquered the rest of China and officially started the nation's first imperial dynasty. Qin established 36 commanderies on its territory, and Taiyuan was one of them, with Jinyang as its capital.

=== Jin dynasty and Sixteen Kingdoms ===
During the Jin dynasty, Taiyuan was again transformed into a vassal state. Following the ending of the Jin dynasty, ethnic minority peoples settled a series of short-lived sovereign states in northern China, commonly referred to as Sixteen Kingdoms. Taiyuan was part of Former Zhao, Later Zhao, Former Qin, Former Yan, Former Qin again, Western Yan, and Later Yan, chronologically.

In 304, Liu Yuan founded the Xiongnu state of Former Zhao, whose army raided the area around Taiyuan for years and eventually conquered it in 316. In 319, Taiyuan became part of Later Zhao, founded by Shi Le. It was then obtained by Former Yan in 358 and by Former Qin in 370.

Fu Jian died in 384. His son Fu Pi declared himself an emperor in 385, with Jinyang as his capital. The following year, he was defeated by the Western Yan prince Murong Yong, and Taiyuan became part of Western Yan.

=== Southern and Northern Dynasties ===
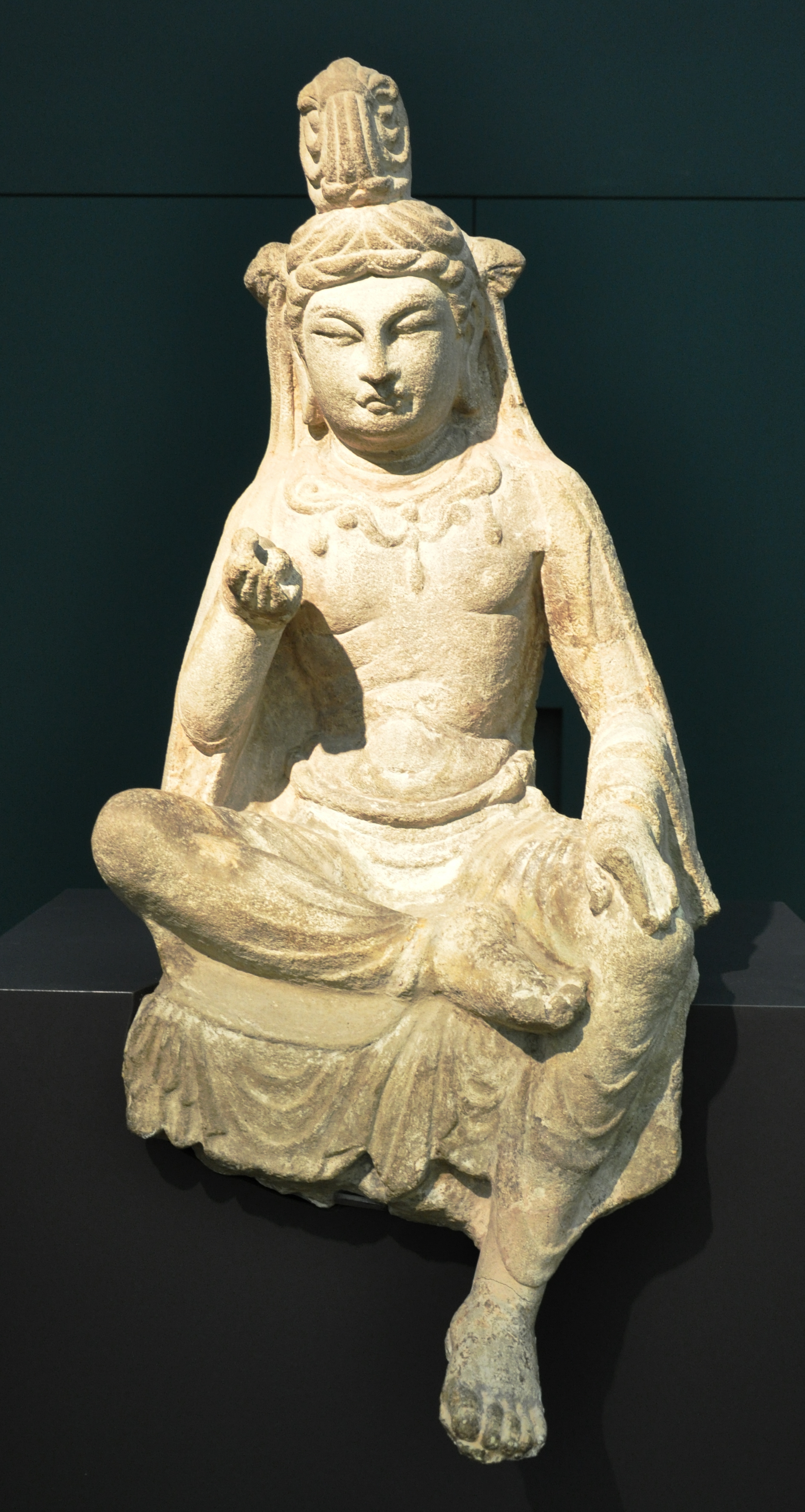
A sitting bodhisattva statue originally from Tianlongshan Grottoes, currently at Rietberg Museum in Zürich, Switzerland

In 386, Tuoba Gui founded Northern Wei. In 396, it expanded to Taiyuan. In 534, Eastern Wei was founded by Gao Huan, with its capital in the city of Ye, and Taiyuan as the alternative capital (别都), where the mansion of the "Great Chancellor" Gao Huan (大丞相府) was located. In 577, Taiyuan was conquered and became part of Northern Zhou.

=== Sui dynasty ===
Main battles for the establishment of the Tang dynasty, originating in Taiyuan

In 581, Emperor Wen of Sui founded the Sui dynasty. Jinyang was first the administrative center of Bing Zhou (并州), which was transformed into the Taiyuan Commandery.

=== Tang dynasty ===
In 618, Li Yuan founded the Tang dynasty, which is generally considered to have been a golden age of Chinese civilization. Taiyuan expanded significantly, partly as it was the military base of the founding emperors Li Yuan and Li Shimin.

In 690, Wu Zetian made Taiyuan the Northern Capital, (北都; Běidū), one of three in the nation, along with Chang'an and Luoyang, as described in a poem by Li Bai: "The king of heaven has three capitals, the Northern capital is one of them". ("天王三京, 北都居一"). In 742, Emperor Xuanzong of Tang changed the Northern Capital's name to Beijing (北京). (Note: Not to be confused with the modern-day Chinese capital, though they shared the same name.)

=== Five Dynasties and Ten Kingdoms ===
In 923, Li Cunxu, son of Li Keyong, founded Later Tang, with the capital of Daming, and soon conquered most of northern China, ending Later Liang. Li Cunxu moved the capital from Daming to Luoyang, and Taiyuan was set as a provisional capital, under the name Beidu (北都, literally 'northern capital').

In 936, Shi Jingtang established Later Jin in Taiyuan, with help from the Khitan Liao dynasty. The next year, Shi Jingtang moved the capital to Luoyang and then to Kaifeng, and Taiyuan became a provisional northern capital (Beijing) again.

=== Song dynasty ===
Zhao Kuangyin (Emperor Taizu) established the Song dynasty and embarked on a campaign of Chinese re-unification. Using a power struggle at the Northern Han court, he moved against it in late 968. By early 969, his armies encircled Taiyuan and defeated the reinforcements sent by the Khitan. However, an attempt to flood the city failed. The siege was lifted after three months, as heavy rains caused diseases within the besieging army, the supplies were running low, and another Khitan relief force was advancing towards the city.

Taizu launched the second invasion of Northern Han in September 969, but the armies were recalled after his death on 14 November.

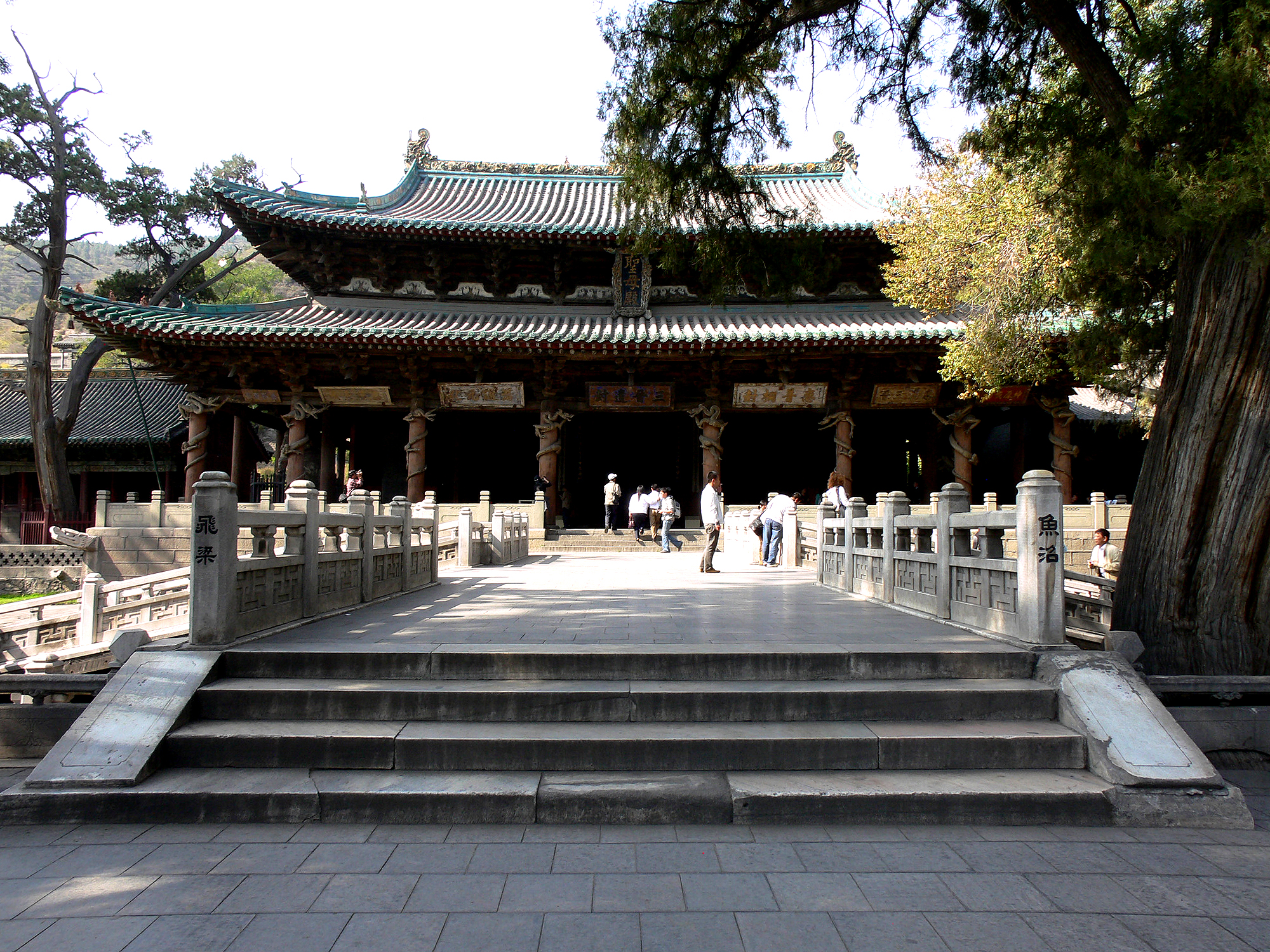
The hall of the holy mother in Jinci, constructed from 1023 to 1032, during the Song dynasty

Taizu's brother Emperor Taizong of Song subjugated the last independent kingdoms in the south of China by 978 and in 979 launched the third campaign against the Northern Han and its overlord, the Khitan state of Liao. Using the northwestern route instead of the southern (used in the previous campaigns), Taizong's armies defeated a major Liao force. Isolated, the Northern Han resisted for only fifteen days before surrendering. In contrast to the mild policies of his brother, Taizong dealt harshly with the city. He ordered the flooding of Taiyuan by releasing the Fen River and set the city on fire. The former capital was subsequently downgraded from prefecture to county town status.

It was not until 982 that a new city was founded on the banks of the Fen River. The oldest existing building in Taiyuan today is the Temple of the Goddess (simplified Chinese: 圣母殿; traditional Chinese: 聖母殿), inside the Jinci complex. It was originally built in 1023 and reconstructed in 1102.

From 1027, one of two private markets for Tangut goods, particularly salt, operated in Taiyuan. During the Song period, many people, including the family of the chancellor Wang Anshi, migrated south.

=== Yuan state ===
The Mongol Empire emerged in 1206 under the leadership of Genghis Khan, and it expanded quickly. In 1218, Taiyuan was conquered by the Mongol army led by General Muqali. Kublai Khan established the Yuan dynasty in 1271, and the administrative area of Taiyuan Lu (太原路) was expanded.

The Taoist Longshan Grottoes were built during the early Yuan dynasty.

=== Ming dynasty ===
In 1368, the Hongwu Emperor established the Ming dynasty, and Taiyuan was obtained from Yuan by General Xu Da. The Ming dynasty installed the Nine Military Garrisons to defend the northern territory during the reign of the Hongzhi Emperor, which included the garrison of Taiyuan (太原镇).

Shanxi merchants became prominent in Chinese business history from the beginning of the Ming dynasty, thanks to the logistical requirements of the military around the borders of northern Shanxi to defend against the remnant Mongol Northern Yuan dynasty.

=== Qing ===
Throughout the Qing dynasty, international trade with Russia, especially of tea, and the creation and development of so-called draft banks, or piaohao, boosted the central Shanxi basin to become the financial center of Qing China. Even though most piaohao were based in the neighboring counties of Qi, Taigu, and Yuci, Taiyuan became a significant trading center, due to its political and economic status in Shanxi.

In 1900, the Taiyuan massacre occurred, during which angry Chinese killed European children and their missionary parents.

=== Republican era ===
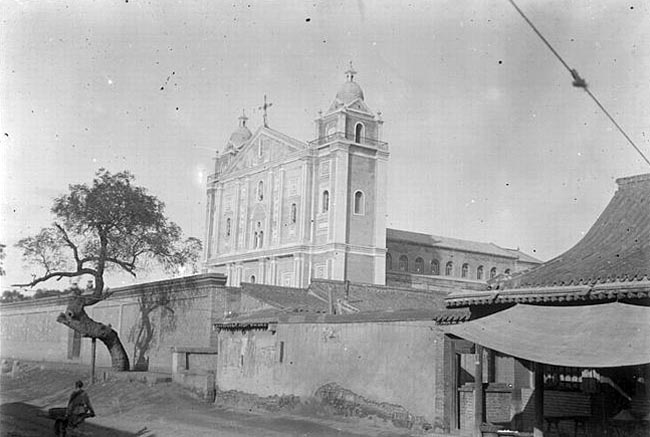
Taiyuan Cathedral, photographed by Édouard Chavannes in 1907

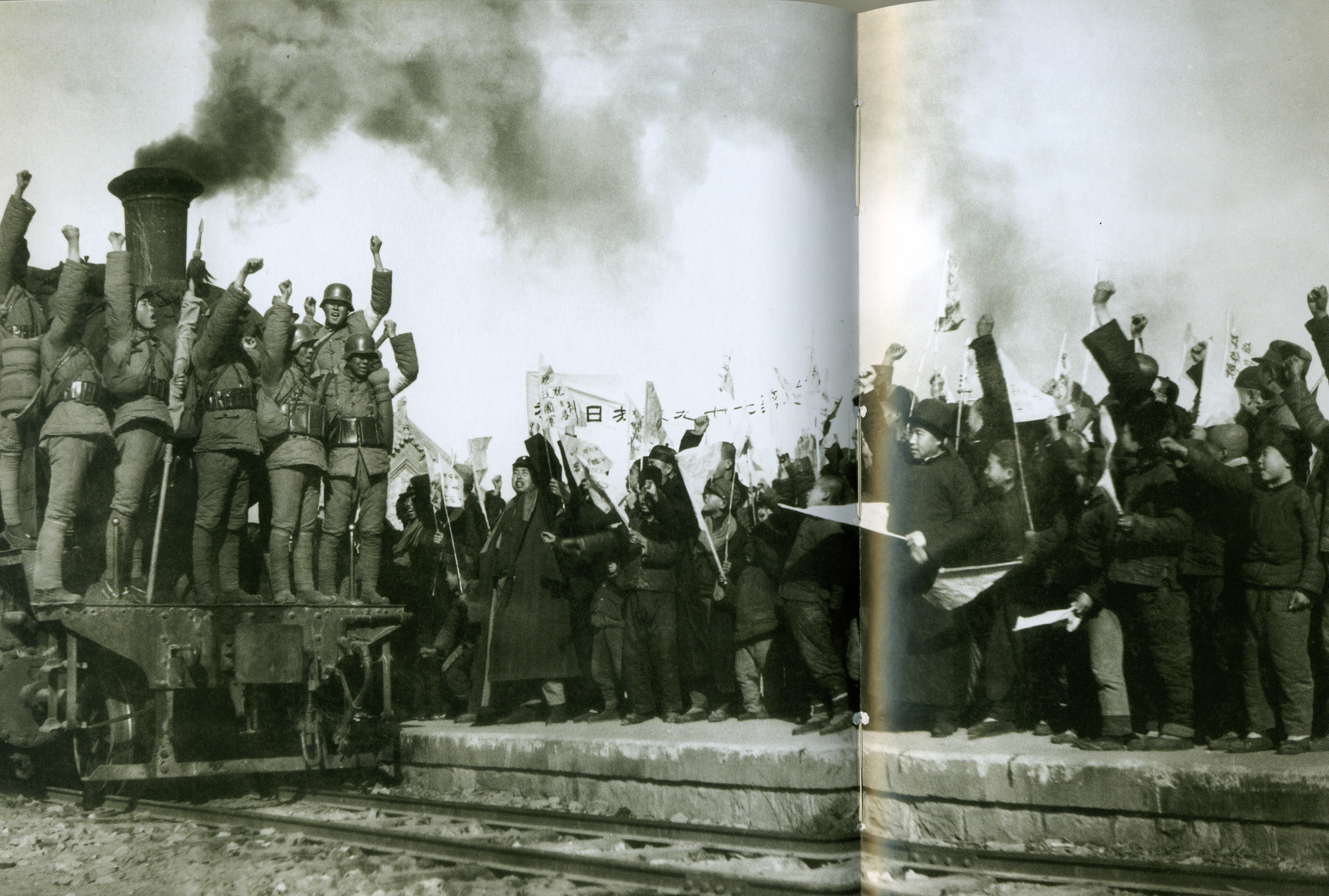
Chinese soldiers and civilians celebrating the victory at Pingxingguan in 1937

The warlord Yan Xishan retained control of Shanxi from the Xinhai Revolution in 1911 to the end of the Chinese Civil War in 1949. Taiyuan consequently flourished as the center of his comparatively progressive province and experienced extensive industrial development. It was linked by rail both to the far southwest of Shanxi and to Datong in the north. Until 1949, Yan's arsenal in Taiyuan was the only factory in China sufficiently advanced to produce field artillery. In 1923, Yan facilitated the construction of the province's first airport, Taiyuan Chengbei Airport, which allowed him to further develop a small air force. Because Yan succeeded in keeping Shanxi uninvolved in most of the major battles between rival warlords that occurred in China during the 1910s and 1920s, Taiyuan was never taken from Yan by an invading army until the Japanese occupied it in 1937.

Yan was aware of the threat posed by the Japanese, and in order to defend against their impending invasion of Shanxi, he entered into a secret "united front" agreement with the Chinese Communist Party in November 1936. He then allowed agents under Zhou Enlai to establish a secret headquarters in Taiyuan. Yan, under the slogan "resistance against the enemy and defense of the soil", attempted to recruit young patriotic intellectuals to his government from across China. By 1936, Taiyuan had become a gathering point for anti-Japanese intellectuals who had fled from Beijing, Tianjin, and Northeast China. A representative of the Japanese army, speaking of the final defense of Taiyuan, said that "nowhere in China have the Chinese fought so obstinately".

From the occupation of Taiyuan to the Japanese surrender in 1945, the invaders continued to exploit Taiyuan's industries and resources to supply the Japanese army. After they surrendered surrendered to Yan Xishan, 10,000–15,000 Japanese troops, including both enlisted men and officers, decided to fight for Yan rather than return to Japan. Yan also retained the services of experienced and foreign-educated Japanese technicians and professional staff brought into Taiyuan by the Japanese to run the complex of industries that they had developed around the city.

Taiyuan was the last area in Shanxi to resist Communist control during the final stages of the war. After Communist forces captured Taiyuan Wusu Airport, its defenders were trapped within the city, facing food shortages and low morale. Taiyuan Qinxian Airport and an adjacent barracks was subsequently established in October 1948 in the Dayingpan area of the city, which was able to accommodate transport aircraft, while the barracks garrisoned the Second and Third Battalions. The existing Chengbei Airport was also reinforced, and two temporary backup airfields were established at Gelaogou and Honggou. The city was taken by Communist forces on 22 April 1949, after they surrounded Taiyuan and cut it off from all means of land and air supply. The capture required the support of 1,300 pieces of artillery. Many Nationalist officers subsequently committed suicide.

== Geography ==
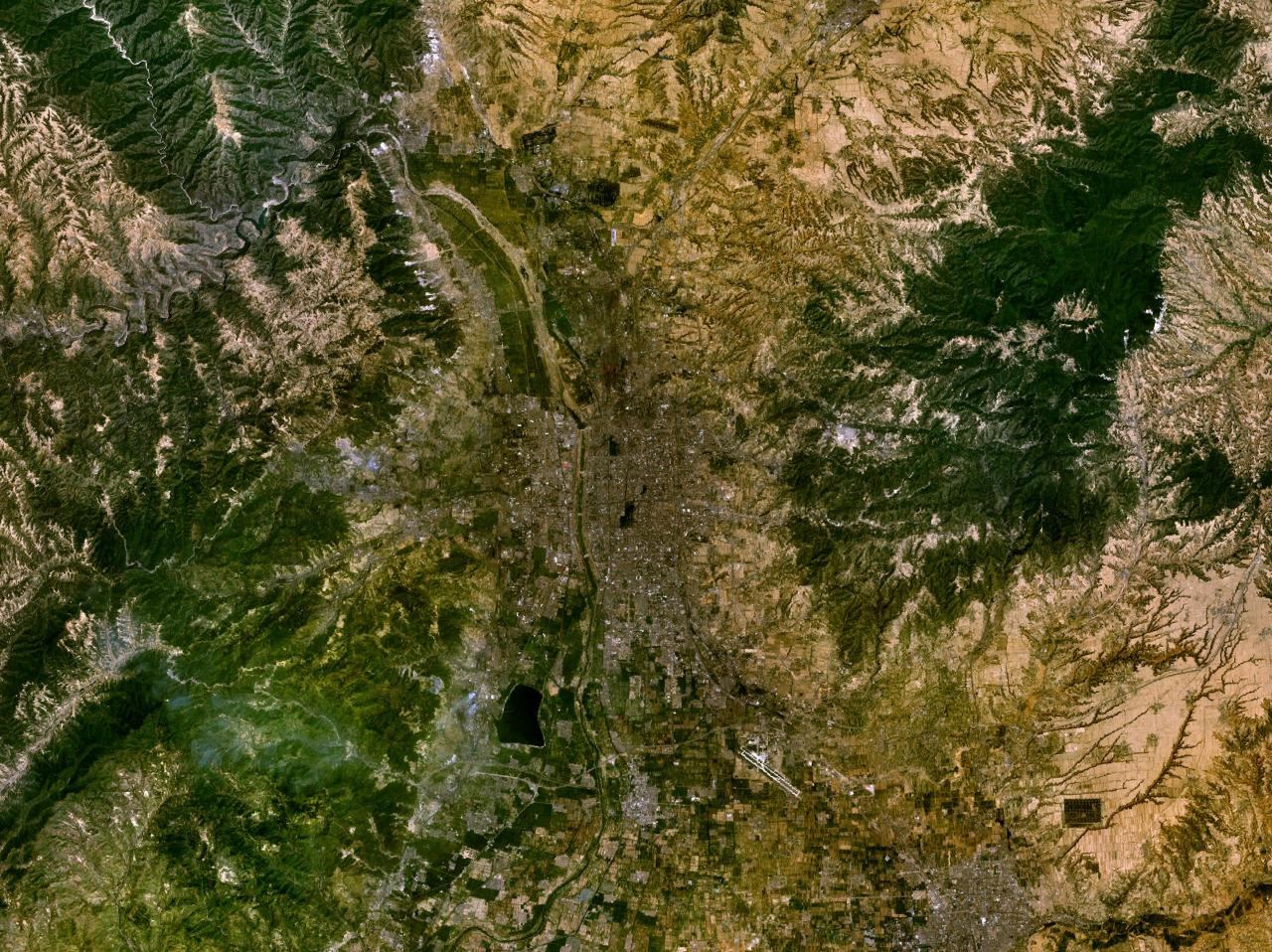
Satellite image of Taiyuan

Taiyuan lies on the Fen River in the north of its fertile upper basin. The city is located at the center of the province, with an east–west span of 144 km (89 mi) and a north–south span of 107 km (66 mi). It commands the north–south route through the province as well as important natural lines of transportation through the Taihang Mountains to Hebei in the east and to northern Shaanxi in the west.

=== Natural resources ===
Taiyuan is abundant in natural resources such as coal, iron, marble, silica, bauxite, limestone, graphite, quartz, phosphorus, gypsum, mica, copper, and gold. It boasts high production of coal, iron, silica, and marble. The western satellite city of Gujiao is the largest production site of metallurgical coal in China. The tree population in Taiyuan is dominated by coniferous forest, which includes pine, white pine, spruce, and cypress.

=== Climate ===
Taiyuan belongs to the warm temperate continental monsoon climate, with long, dry, and cold winters, hot and humid summers, short and windy spring and autumn, and distinct dry and wet seasons. The city experiences a cold semi-arid climate (Köppen climate classification BSk). Springs are dry, with occasional dust storms, followed by early summer heat waves. Most of the year's rainfall is concentrated in July and August. Due to this aridity, there tends to be considerable diurnal variation in temperature, except during the summer. The weather is much cooler than comparable-latitude cities such as Shijiazhuang, due to the city's moderately high altitude. The monthly 24-hour average temperature ranges from −4.7 °C (23.5 °F) in January to 24.3 °C (75.7 °F) in July, while the annual mean is 10.9 °C (51.6 °F). Monthly sunshine ranges from 51 percent in July to 61 percent in May, with 2,493 hours of sunshine annually. Extremes since 1951 have ranged from −25.5 °C (−13.9 °F) to 39.4 °C (102.9 °F), though an unofficial record low of −29.5 °C (−21.1 °F) was noted on 7 January 1930.

Climate data for Taiyuan, elevation 776 m (2,546 ft), (1991–2020 normals, extremes 1951–present)
Month	Jan	Feb	Mar	Apr	May	Jun	Jul	Aug	Sep	Oct	Nov	Dec	Year
Record high °C (°F)	14.9 (58.8)	19.8 (67.6)	28.3 (82.9)	37.5 (99.5)	37.9 (100.2)	38.7 (101.7)	39.4 (102.9)	36.6 (97.9)	34.9 (94.8)	30.4 (86.7)	23.2 (73.8)	19.6 (67.3)	39.4 (102.9)
Mean daily maximum °C (°F)	2.3 (36.1)	6.7 (44.1)	13.3 (55.9)	20.7 (69.3)	26.3 (79.3)	29.5 (85.1)	30.3 (86.5)	28.6 (83.5)	24.2 (75.6)	18.1 (64.6)	10.1 (50.2)	3.5 (38.3)	17.8 (64.0)
Daily mean °C (°F)	−4.7 (23.5)	−0.7 (30.7)	5.9 (42.6)	13.2 (55.8)	19.0 (66.2)	22.7 (72.9)	24.3 (75.7)	22.6 (72.7)	17.4 (63.3)	10.8 (51.4)	3.2 (37.8)	−3.1 (26.4)	10.9 (51.6)
Mean daily minimum °C (°F)	−10.2 (13.6)	−6.5 (20.3)	−0.5 (31.1)	6.0 (42.8)	11.7 (53.1)	16.2 (61.2)	19.1 (66.4)	17.8 (64.0)	12.1 (53.8)	5.1 (41.2)	−2.0 (28.4)	−8.1 (17.4)	5.1 (41.1)
Record low °C (°F)	−25.5 (−13.9)	−24.6 (−12.3)	−18.0 (−0.4)	−9.7 (14.5)	−0.7 (30.7)	4.4 (39.9)	7.2 (45.0)	7.4 (45.3)	−2.0 (28.4)	−13.9 (7.0)	−21.2 (−6.2)	−23.3 (−9.9)	−25.5 (−13.9)
Average precipitation mm (inches)	3.2 (0.13)	4.7 (0.19)	10.1 (0.40)	22.1 (0.87)	30.6 (1.20)	47.9 (1.89)	104.3 (4.11)	102.5 (4.04)	59.8 (2.35)	29.6 (1.17)	13.1 (0.52)	2.6 (0.10)	430.5 (16.97)
Average precipitation days (≥ 0.1 mm)	1.7	2.4	3.2	5.4	6.0	9.6	11.4	10.7	7.6	6.1	3.2	1.6	68.9
Average snowy days	2.7	3.2	2.0	0.7	0	0	0	0	0	0.1	1.8	2.4	12.9
Average relative humidity (%)	51	47	44	45	46	57	69	73	71	66	59	52	57
Mean monthly sunshine hours	164.9	173.4	216.1	242.7	268.0	241.4	228.8	221.9	199.9	199.6	172.0	163.9	2,492.6
Percentage possible sunshine	54	56	58	61	61	55	51	53	54	58	57	55	56
Source 1: China Meteorological Administration NOAA all-time January high
Source 2: Météo Climat (records)

=== Environment ===
The municipality of Taiyuan is 6,988 km^{2} (2,698 sq mi). It had a forest area of 146,700 hectares and total grassland area of 422.5 km^{2} (163.1 sq mi) in 2007. The forest area coverage rate in the six urban districts increased to 21.69% in 2015.

==== Air pollution ====
Taiyuan has suffered from severe air pollution, especially in the 1990s and the first decade of the 21st century, and it was once listed among the ten most air-polluted cities in the world. Air quality has been gradually improving, with increasing public awareness of air quality control and stricter and more detailed rules for pollution being applied. The city has taken action to combat air pollution, creating a "coal-free zone" of 1,460 km^{2} in 2017. This zone prevents most people and organizations from buying, selling, storing, transporting, burning, or using coal. In 2019, the Taiyuan City Government expanded the size of this zone slightly, to a total of 1,574 km^{2}.

== Administrative divisions ==
Map
Name	Simplified Chinese	Hanyu Pinyin	Population (2010)	Area (km^{2})	Density (/km^{2})
City Proper
Xiaodian District	小店区	Xiǎodiàn Qū	804,537	290	2,774
Yingze District	迎泽区	Yíngzé Qū	592,007	105	5,638
Xinghualing District	杏花岭区	Xìnghuālǐng Qū	643,584	146	4,408
Wanbailin District	万柏林区	Wànbǎilín Qū	749,255	289	2,592
Suburban and satellite cities
Jiancaoping District	尖草坪区	Jiāncǎopíng Qū	415,705	296	1,404
Jinyuan District	晋源区	Jìnyuán Qū	221,431	290	763
Gujiao City	古交市	Gǔjiāo Shì	205,143	1,512	135
Rural
Qingxu County	清徐县	Qīngxú Xiàn	343,861	608	565
Yangqu County	阳曲县	Yángqǔ Xiàn	120,228	2,084	57
Loufan County	娄烦县	Lóufán Xiàn	105,841	1,289	82

== Demographics ==
As of the 2020 census, Taiyuan prefecture had a total population of 5,304,061 inhabitants on 6,959 km^{2} (2,687 sq mi), of whom 4,529,141 lived in the six urban districts on 1,460 km^{2} (560 sq mi).

== Economy ==
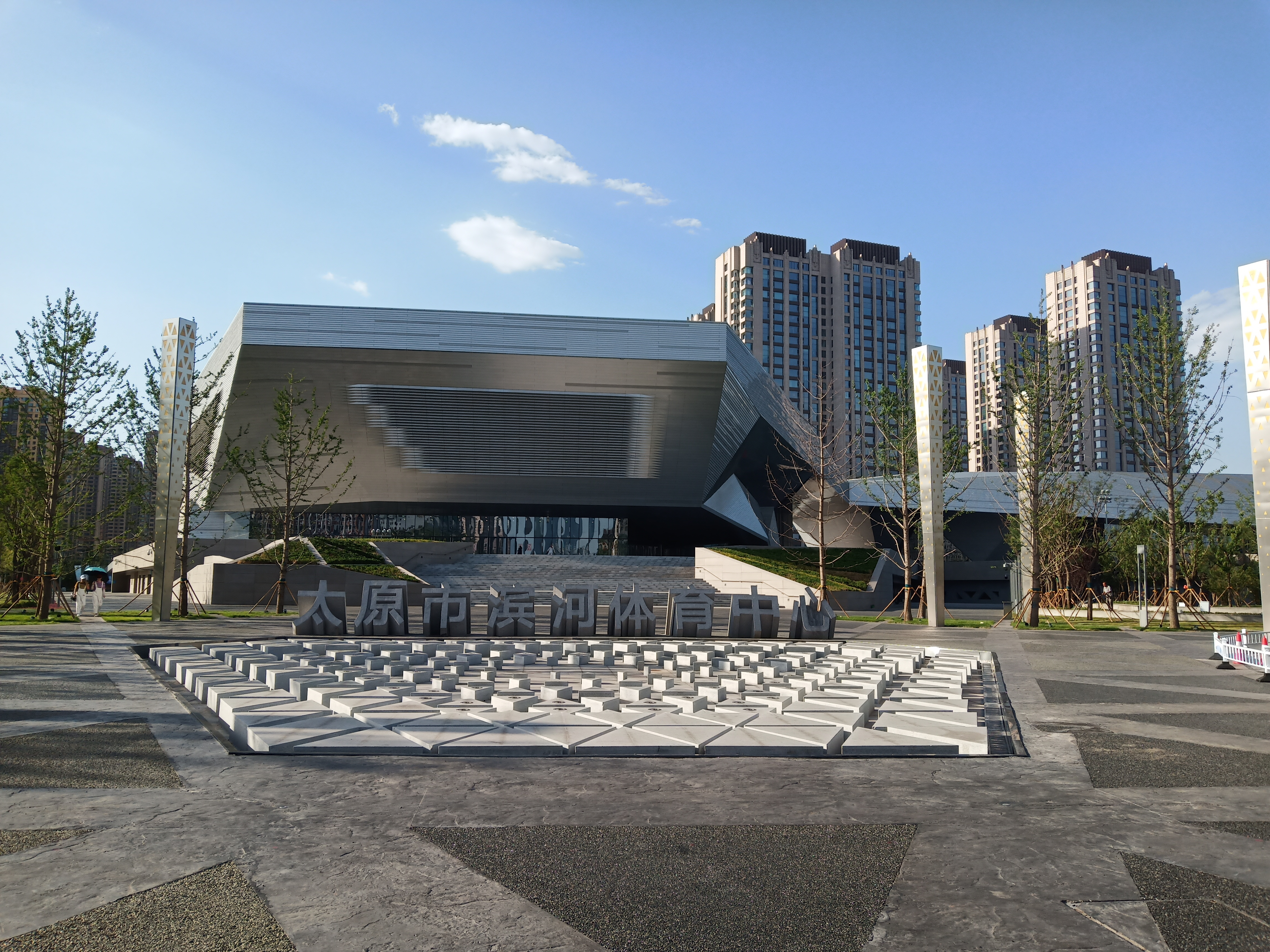
Taiyuan Riverside Sports Arena

Consistent with China's economic expansion throughout the 2010s, Taiyuan's economy has seen steady growth. In 2018, the city's GDP was worth 388.450 billion yuan, more than double what it was in 2010. Disposable income per capita was reported to be 31,031 yuan in 2018, a 7.2% increase from 2017. In 2015, Taiyuan imported 4,085.130 million USD worth of goods and exported the equivalent of 6,592.250 million USD. Taiyuan's primary, secondary, and tertiary industries were worth 3.9 billion yuan, 105.2 billion yuan, and 132.2 billion yuan, respectively, in 2007. Shanxi produces a quarter of China's coal, and Taiyuan is the location of the China Taiyuan Coal Transaction Center, which began trading in 2012.

== Transportation ==
Taiyuan is a major transportation hub in northern China, with highways linking neighboring provincial capitals, and airlines to most other major Chinese cities and some international ones.

=== Public transportation ===
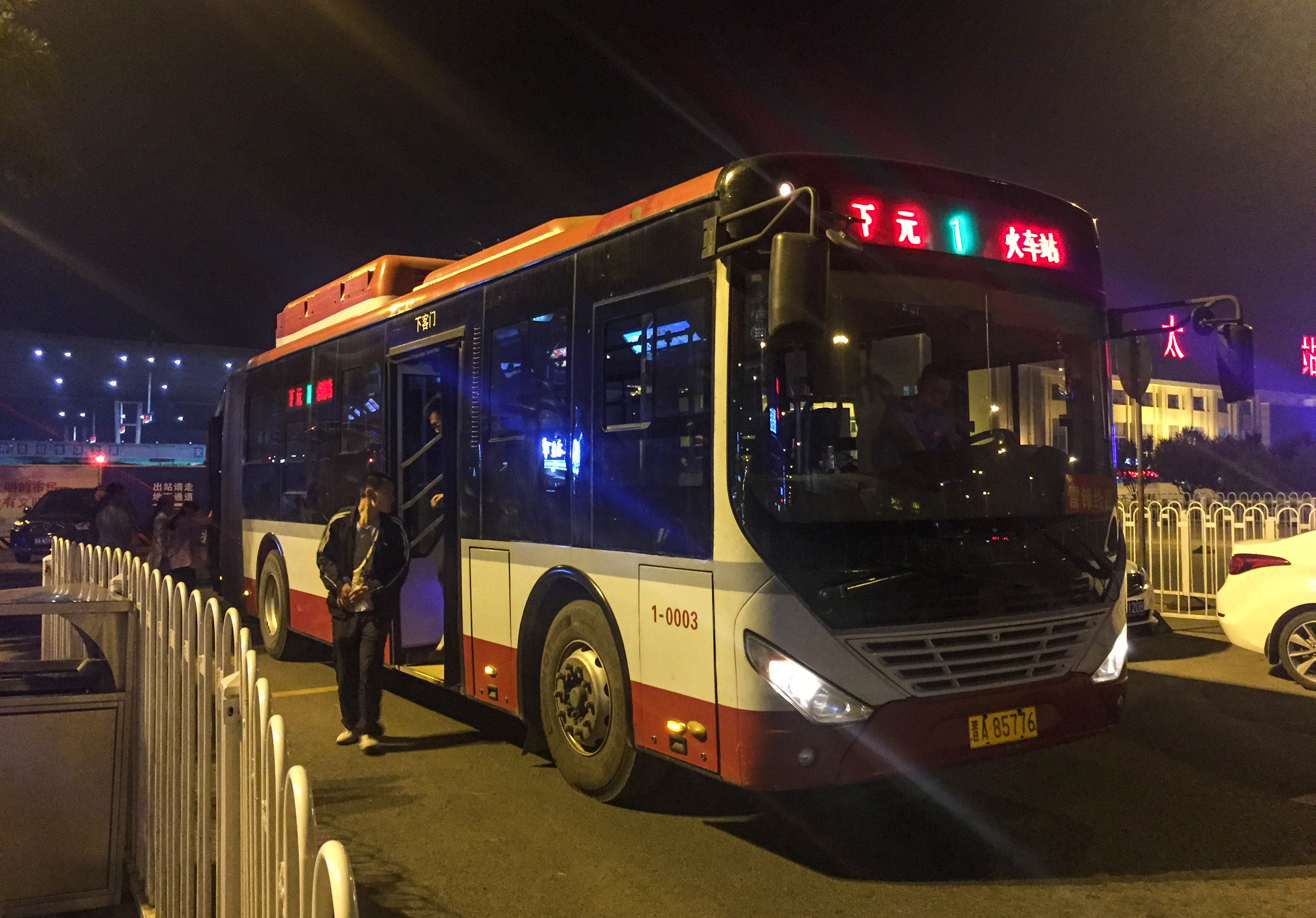
A 1 route bus in Taiyuan

The Taiyuan Metro opened in 2020. Line 1 launched in February 2025, while Line 2 has been operating since December 2020.

In early 2016, the city began the conversion of all its 8,000 taxis to purely electric vehicles, initially using the BYD e6.

=== Air ===
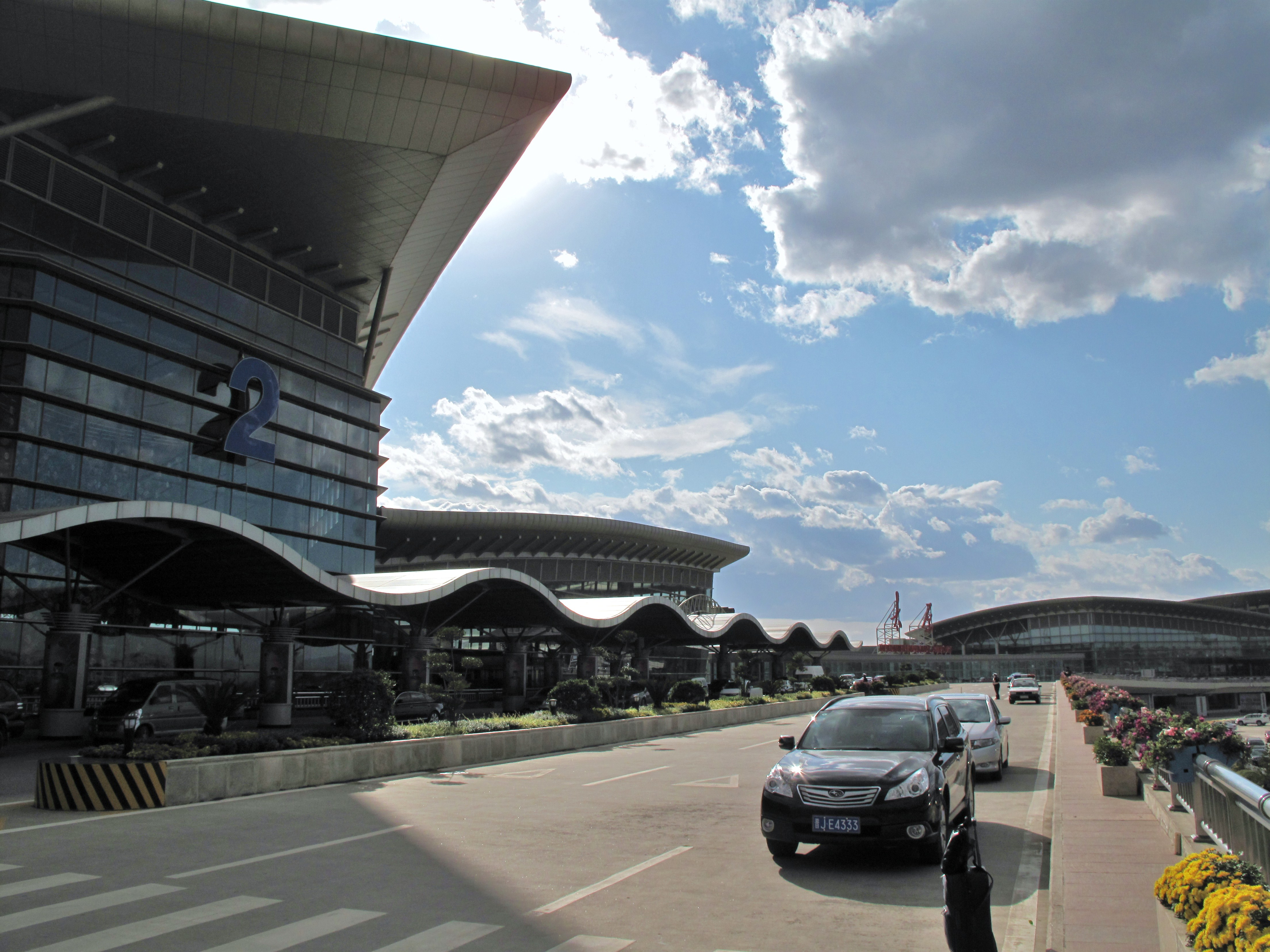
Taiyuan Wusu International Airport

The city's primary airport is Taiyuan Wusu International Airport, which accommodates domestic airlines to major cities such as Beijing, Shanghai, and Dalian. International flights are also available.

=== Road ===
Taiyuan has a number of major roads, such as the G5, G20 (including Shitai Expressway), G55, G2001, G307, G108, and G208.

=== Rail ===
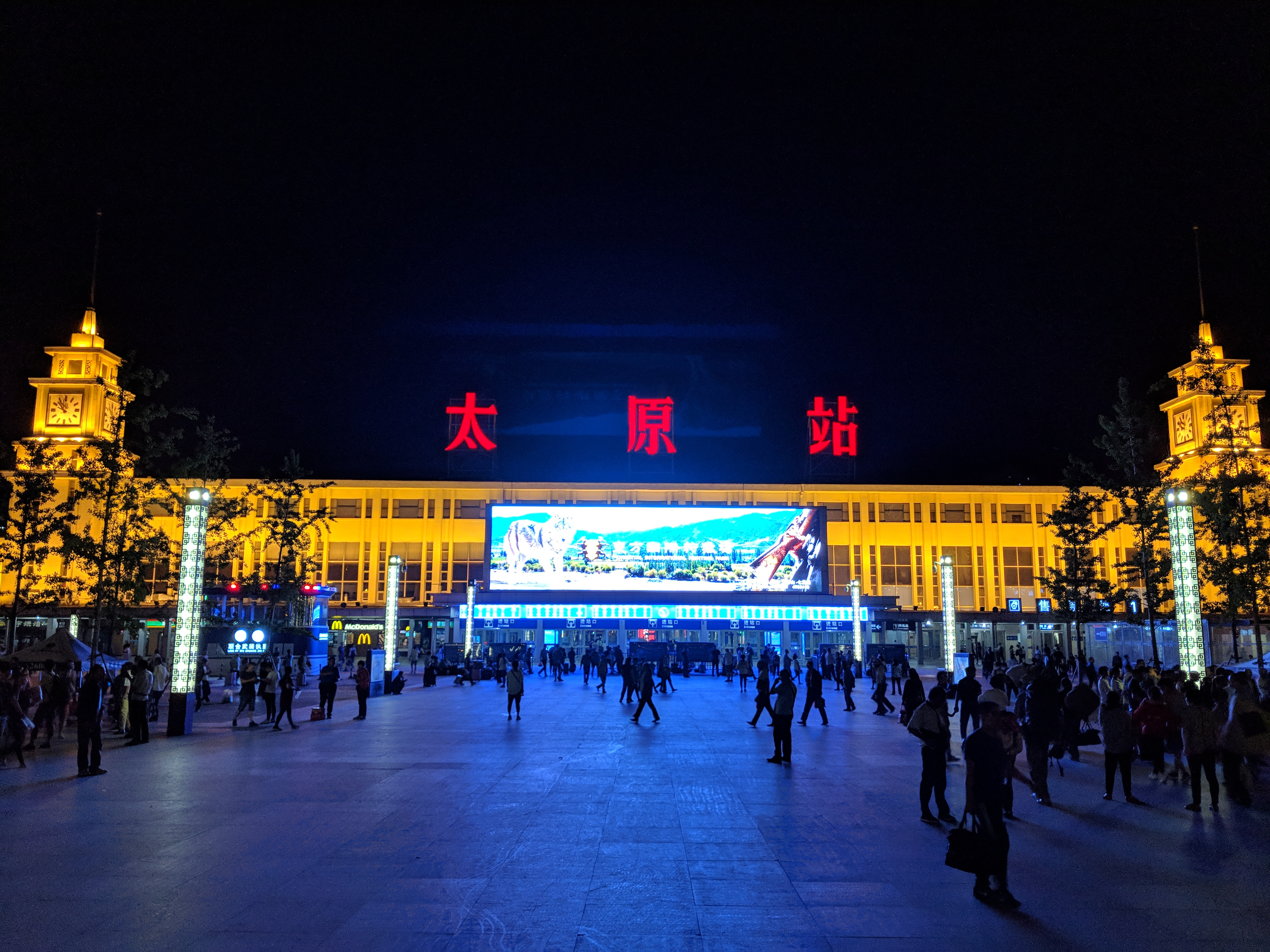
Taiyuan railway station

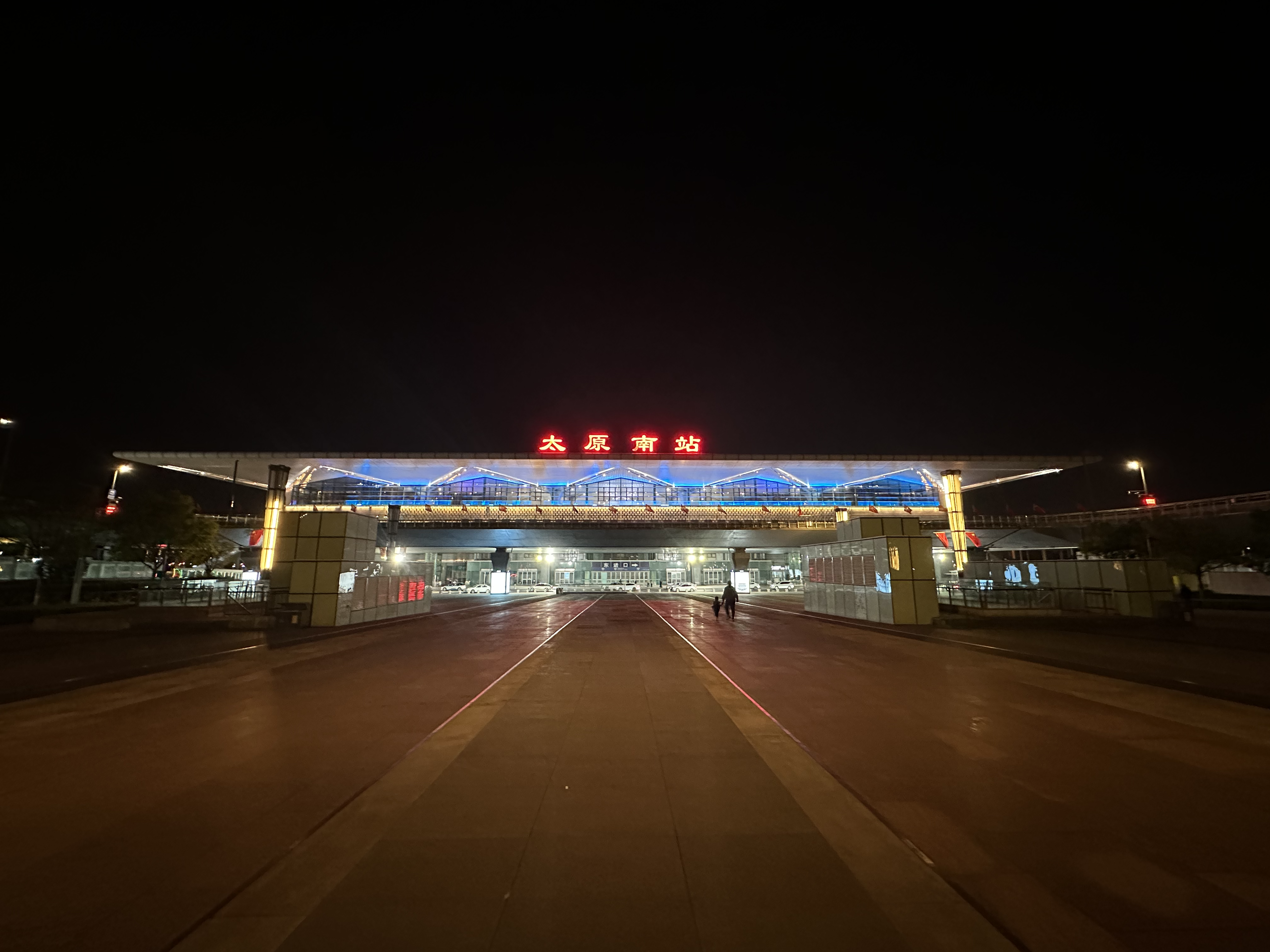
Taiyuan South railway station

Major high-speed railways passing through Taiyuan include the Shijiazhuang–Taiyuan, Datong–Xi'an, and Taiyuan–Jiaozuo. By high-speed rail, the travel time between Taiyuan and Beijing is less than three hours, on a distance of 600 km (370 mi). The city's main train station is Taiyuan South railway station. The conventional-speed Taiyuan–Zhongwei–Yinchuan railway, opened in 2011, provides a direct connection with western Shanxi, northern Shaanxi, Ningxia, and points further west.

== Food ==
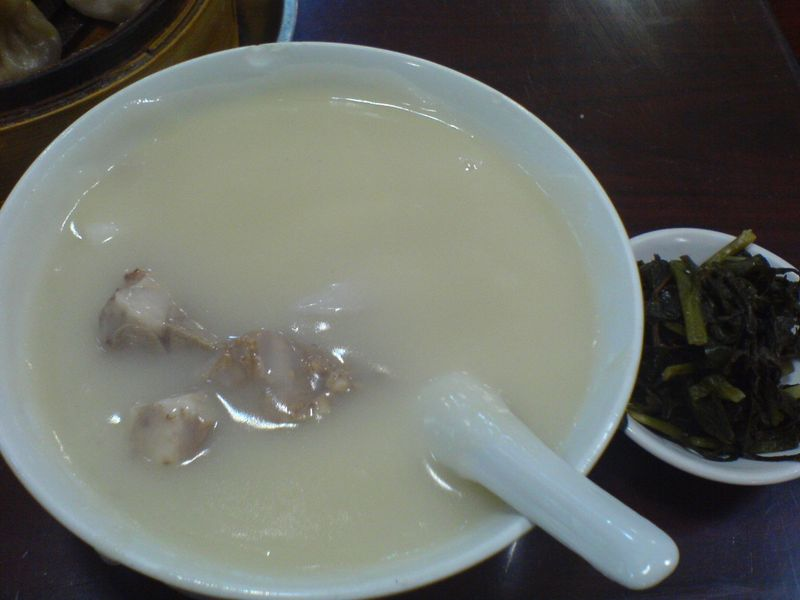
Tounao soup

Taiyuan's local specialities include:

  - Tomato egg noodles (Chinese: 西红柿炒鸡蛋面; pinyin: xīhóngshì chǎo jīdàn miàn; lit. 'noodles with tomato and scrambled eggs')
  - Tijian (剔尖; tī jiān; 'scraped noodles')
  - Dao Xiao noodles (刀削面; dāo xiāo miàn)
  - Tounao (头脑; tóu nǎo; 'brain'): Contains mutton, rice wine, and vegetables. This dish was created by the polymath Fu Shan, who was proficient in medicine, for his old and sickly mother.
  - Lao Chen Cu mature vinegar (老陈醋; lǎo chén cù)
  - Yuci flour sausage (榆次灌肠; Yú Cì guàn cháng)
  - Fried pork with vegetables (过油肉; guò yóu ròu)
  - Mutton soup (羊肉汤; yángròu tāng)

== Sports ==
The Shanxi Loongs of the Chinese Basketball Association play at Riverside Sports Arena. The defunct football club Shanxi Metropolis played at the Shanxi Sports Centre Stadium.

== Tourism ==
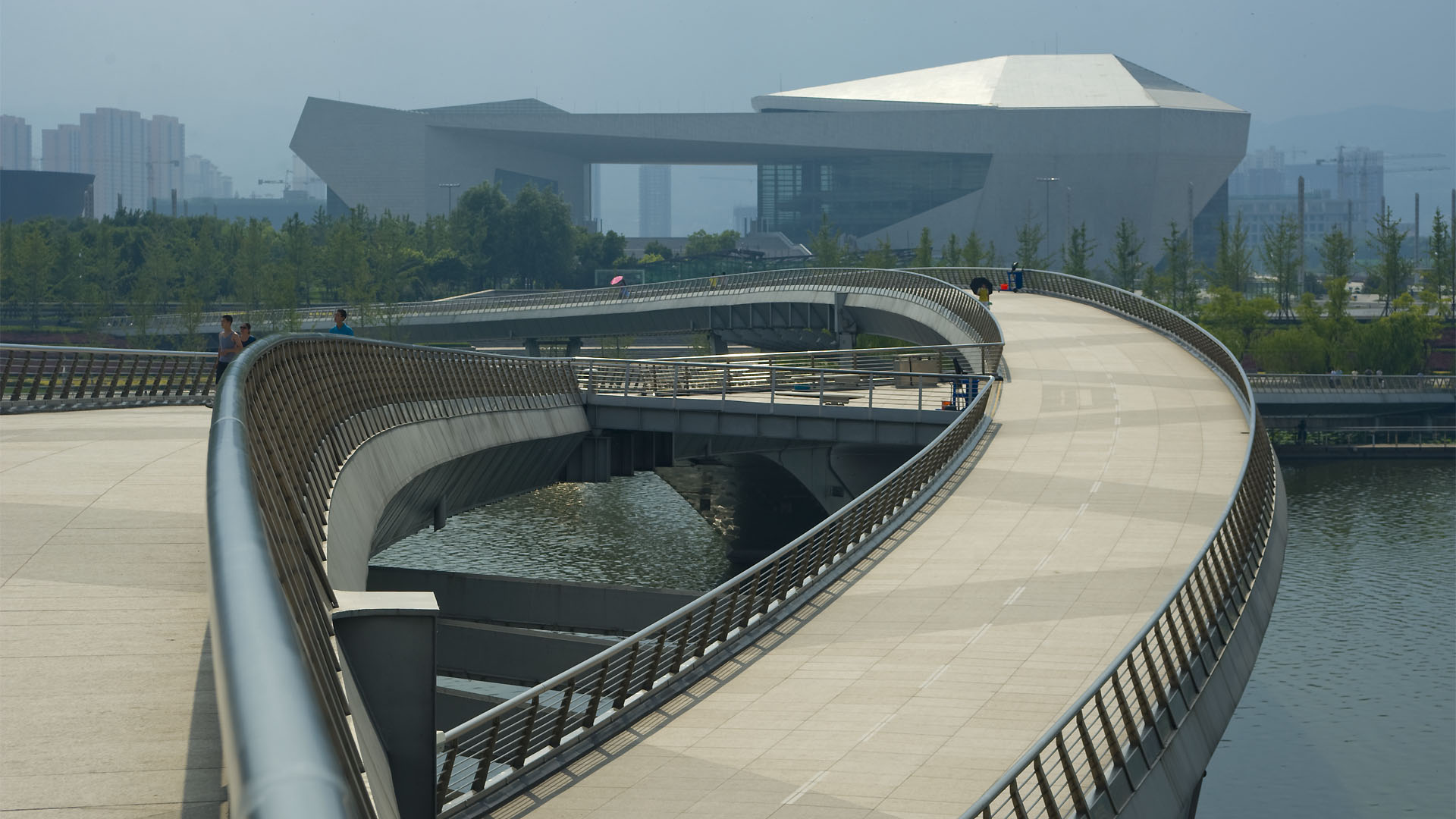
Jifen footbridge over the Fen River, with Shanxi Theater in the background

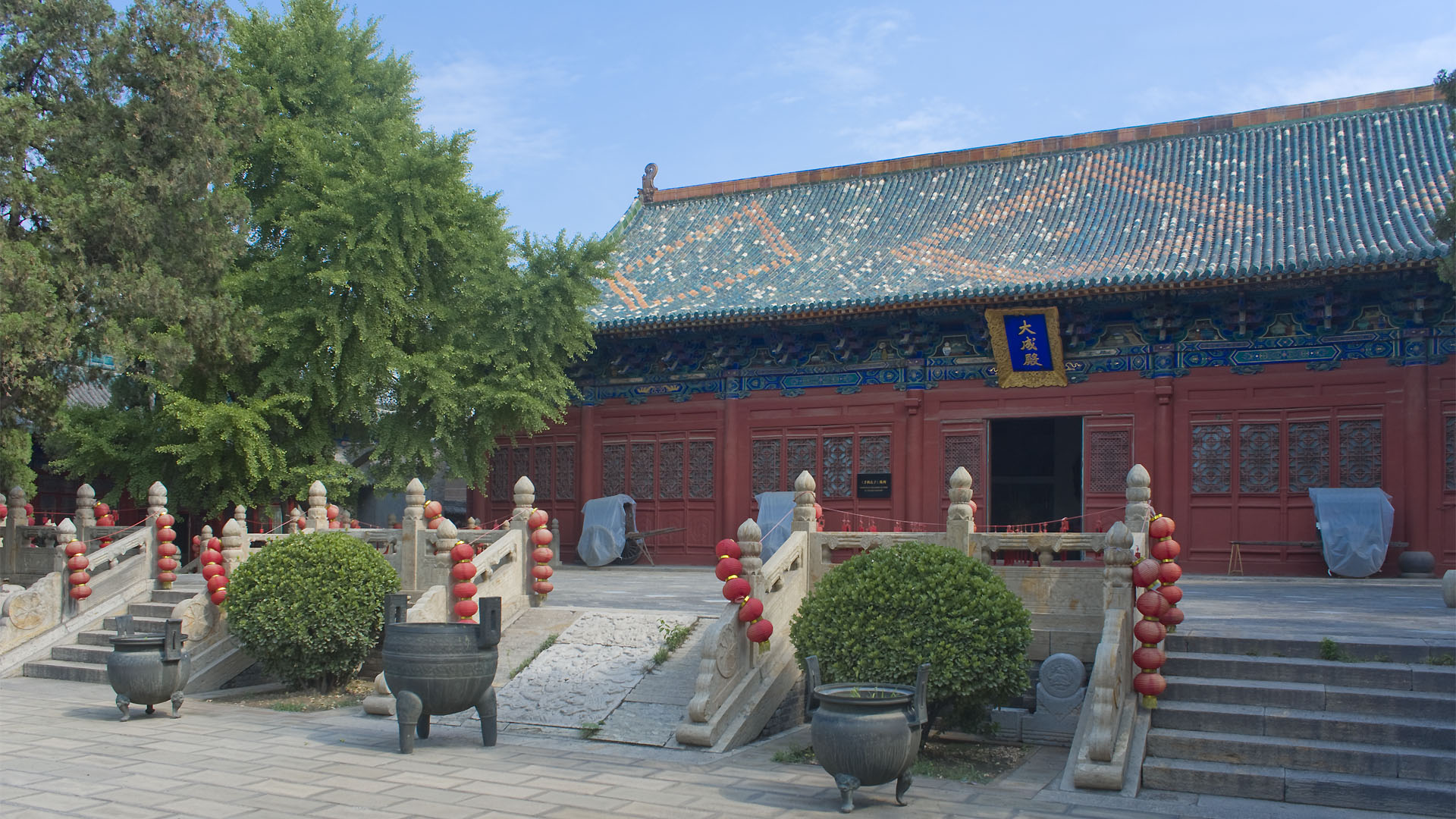
Shanxi Folklore Museum courtyard, with old Confucian temple

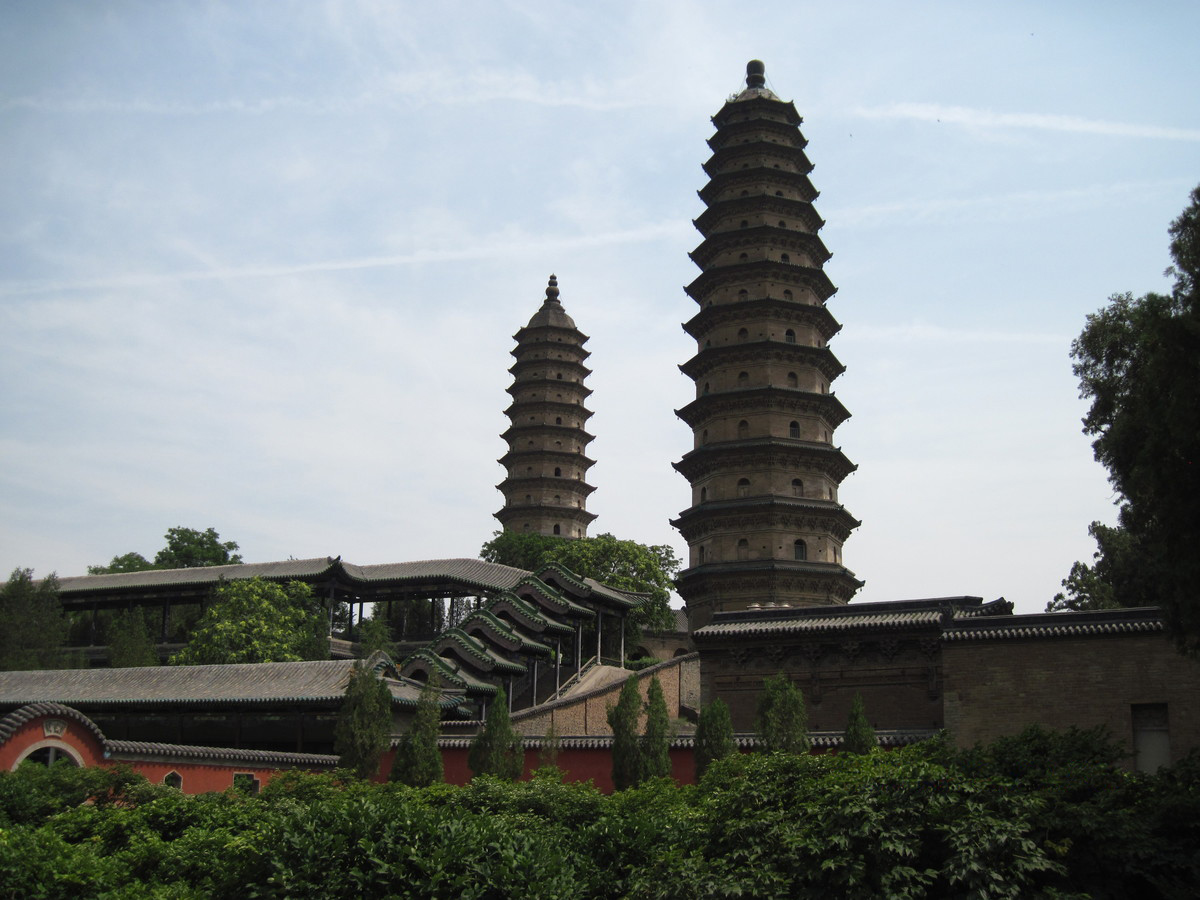
The twin towers inside the Yongzuo Temple

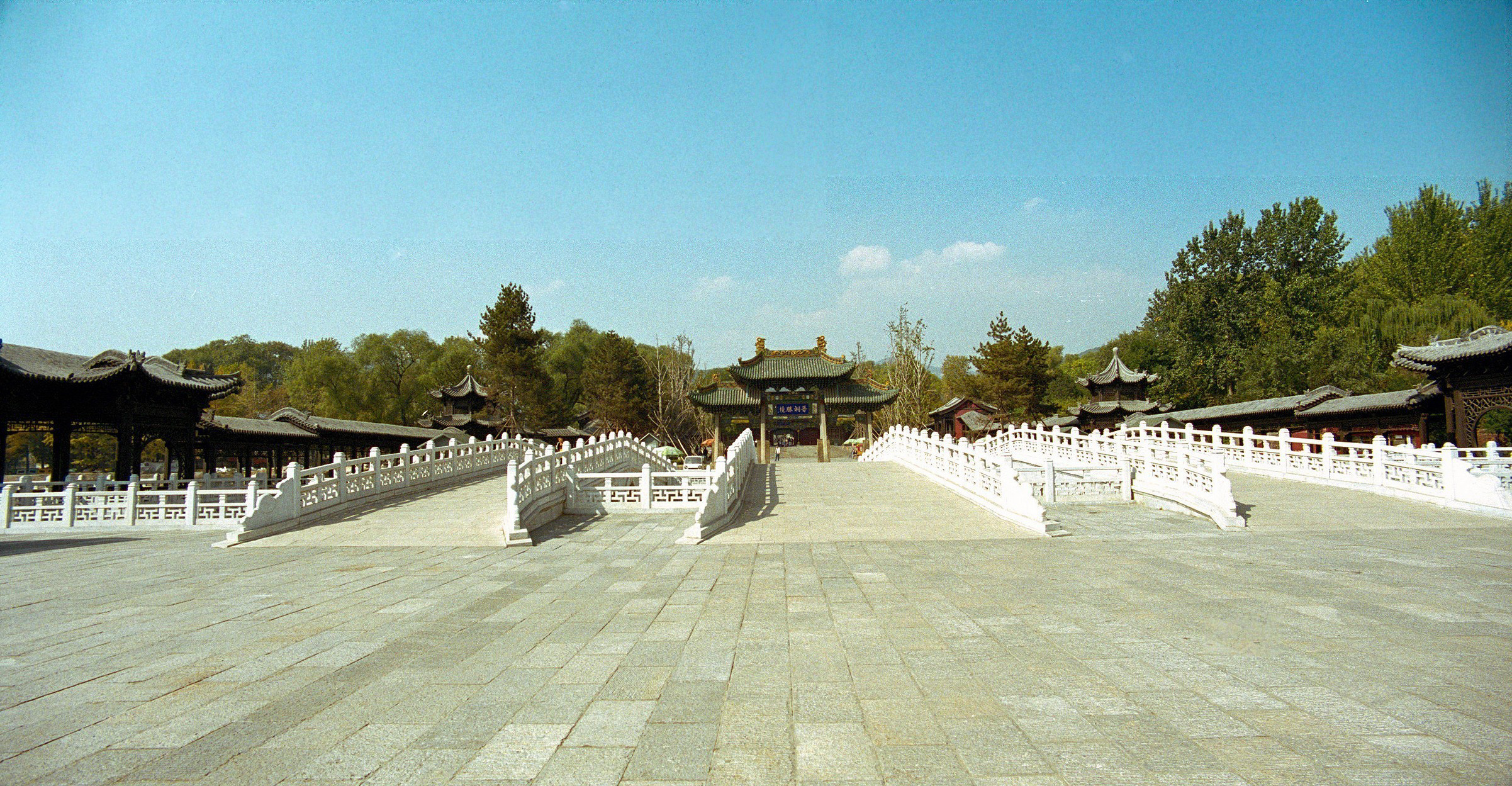
Jinci Temple

Taiyuan is a modern city with only a few historic buildings remaining in the centre. The remnants of old Taiyuan can be found west of the central station, north of Fudong Street, and close to Wuyi Road.

One of the main tourist destinations is Shanxi Museum, located on West Binhe Road, in downtown Taiyuan, which is among the largest museums in China.

The twin towers in Yongzuo Temple, which are featured on the city's emblem, are regarded as a symbol of Taiyuan. The temple is southeast of the city centre.

Chongshan Monastery, Longtan Park, and Yingze Park, in the city centre, are popular tourist destinations.

Jinci Temple and Christ's Church, Jinyuan, are both located in the Jinyuan District of southern Taiyuan. The district is also home to the Flying Bridge Across the Fish Pond, built during the Song dynasty.

Along the West Mountain range in western Taiyuan are the Tianlongshan Grottoes, which were gradually built over centuries, beginning in the northern Qi dynasty. They contain thousands of Buddhist statues and artwork. The grottoes exist in a damaged state, with many of the sculptures missing. Many of them are housed in museums around the world. Researchers at the University of Chicago initiated the Tianlongshan Caves Project in 2013, to pursue research and digital imaging of the caves and their sculptures.

Not far from the Tianlongshan Grottoes are the Longshan Grottoes, a Taoist cave complex. The main eight grottoes were carved in 1234–1239, during the Yuan dynasty.

== Education and research ==
Taiyuan is a major city for research, appearing among the top 200 cities in the world by scientific research output in 2022, as tracked by the Nature Index. It is home to Taiyuan University of Technology, Shanxi University, Taiyuan University of Science and Technology, and North University of China, among others.

=== Colleges and universities ===
- Taiyuan University of Technology (太原理工大学)
- Shanxi University (山西大学)
- North University of China (中北大学)
- Shanxi Medical University (山西医科大学)
- Taiyuan University of Science and Technology (太原科技大学)
- Taiyuan Normal University (太原师范学院)
- Shanxi University of Finance and Economics (山西财经大学)
- Shanxi College of Traditional Chinese Medicine

=== Major high schools ===
- The Affiliated High School of Shanxi University (山西大学附属中学)
- Taiyuan No. 5 Secondary School (太原五中)
- Shanxi Experimental Secondary School (山西省实验中学)
- Taiyuan Foreign Language School (太原市外国语学校)

== International relations ==
Taiyuan has a friendship pairing with the following cities:

- Launceston, Tasmania, Australia (established relations on 28 November 1995)
- Douala, Cameroon (established relations on 12 October 1999)
- Chemnitz, Saxony, Germany (established relations on 17 May 1995)
- Saint-Denis, Réunion, France (established relations on 2 March 2012)
- Himeji, Hyōgo, Japan (established relations on 19 May 1987)
- Saratov and Syktyvkar, Russia (established relations on 8 December 1995 and 1 September 1994, respectively)
- Khujand, Tajikistan (established relations on 31 August 2017)
- Donetsk, Ukraine (established relations on 25 August 2012)
- Nashville, Tennessee, United States (established relations on 18 April 2007)

== See also ==
- Taiyuan Satellite Launch Center
