= Taiyuan University of Science and Technology =

University in Taiyuan, Shanxi, China

- 太原科技大学
- Type: Public university
- Established: 1952
- President: Zuo liang
- Vice-president: Li Yongtang Zeng Jianchao Dong Feng Xu Gening Zeng Jianchao Huang Qingxue
- Location: Taiyuan, Shanxi, China
- Website: http://www.tyust.edu.cn/

Taiyuan University of Science and Technology (simplified Chinese: 太原科技大学; traditional Chinese: 太原科技大學; pinyin: Tàiyuán Kējì Dàxué) is a university in Shanxi, People's Republic of China under the authority of the provincial government. It is located in the capital city of Shanxi Province, Taiyuan, a historical and cultural city.

== History ==
The predecessor of the current institution was initially established in 1952 as the Shanxi Provincial School of Mechanical Manufacturing Industry. In 1953, it was renamed as the Taiyuan Machinery Manufacturing School under the First Ministry of Machinery Industry. Subsequently, in 1960, it underwent a further name change to become the Taiyuan Heavy Machinery Institute. Finally, in 2004, it was rebranded as Taiyuan University of Science and Technology.

== Administration ==
The university is structured into the following schools.

- School of Mechanical and Electronic Engineering
- School of Material Science and Engineering
- School of Applied Science
- School of Electronic Information Engineering
- School of Economy and Management
- School of Computer Science and Technology
- School of Law
- School of Humanities and Social Science
- School of Foreign Languages
- School of Arts
- School Physical Education
- School of Adult Education
- Huake College
- International School
