= Twin Pagoda Temple =

Buddhist temples in Taiyuan, Shanxi, China

Coordinates: 37°50′51″N 112°35′48″E

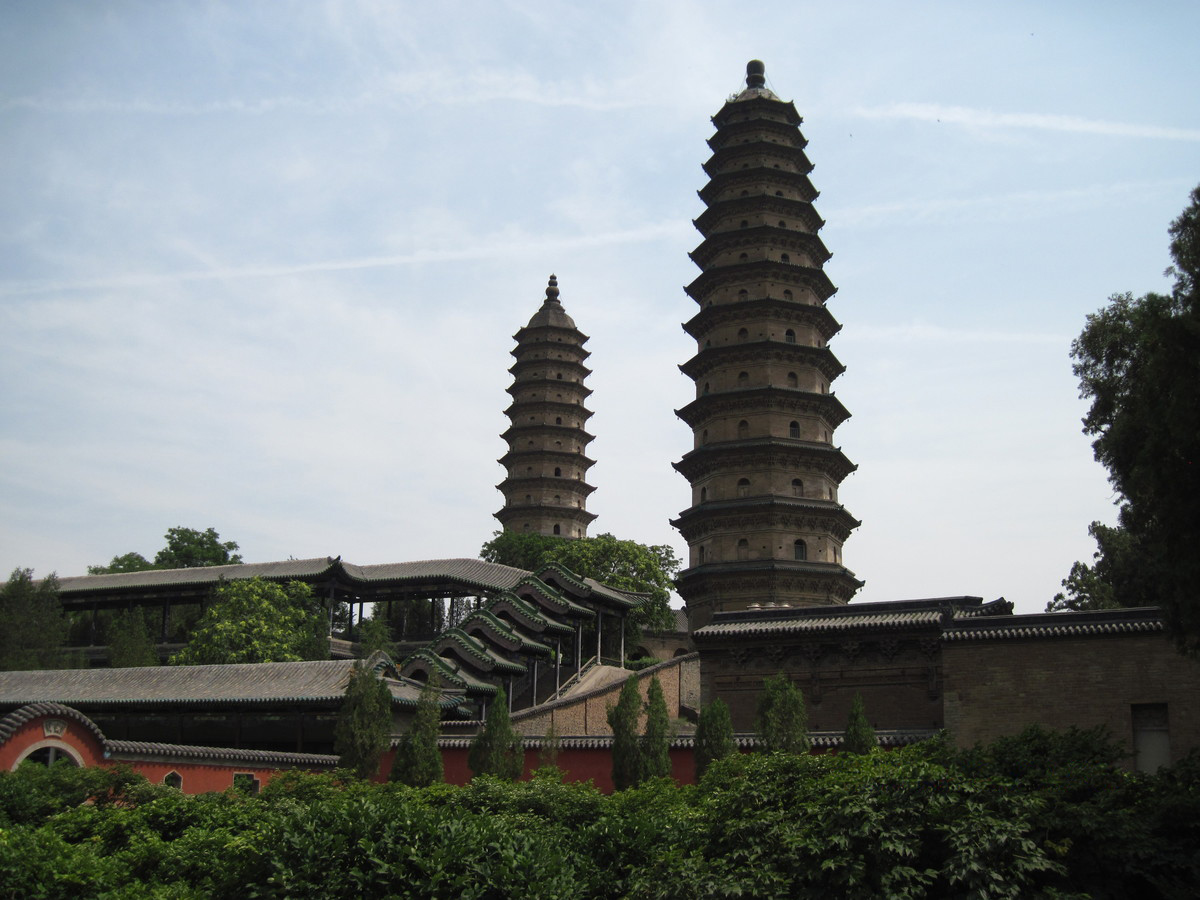
The twin pagodas inside the Yongzuo Temple.

The Twin Pagoda Temple (Chinese: 双塔寺; pinyin: Shūangtǎsì), officially known as Yongzuo Temple (Chinese: 永祚寺; pinyin: Yǒngzuòsì), of Taiyuan, Shanxi Province, China, is a temple containing two pagodas dating from the Ming dynasty.

== History ==
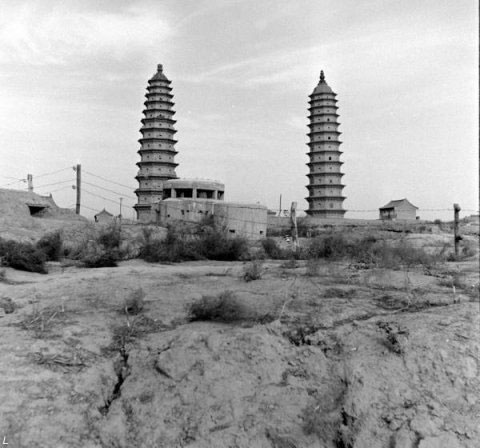
The Twin Pagodas as seen in 1948. In the front is a bunker of the Republic of China Armed Forces.

The East pagoda was built in 1597, and the West one in 1612. In charge of the pagoda's construction was a high ranking monk, named Fodeng (佛灯). By the 20th century, deterioration since construction had caused the East pagoda to slant from its center of gravity by 2.87 meters. In 1995, experts set about trying to correct the slant. They removed earth from underneath the pagoda and successfully corrected the pagoda's tilt.

== Pagodas ==
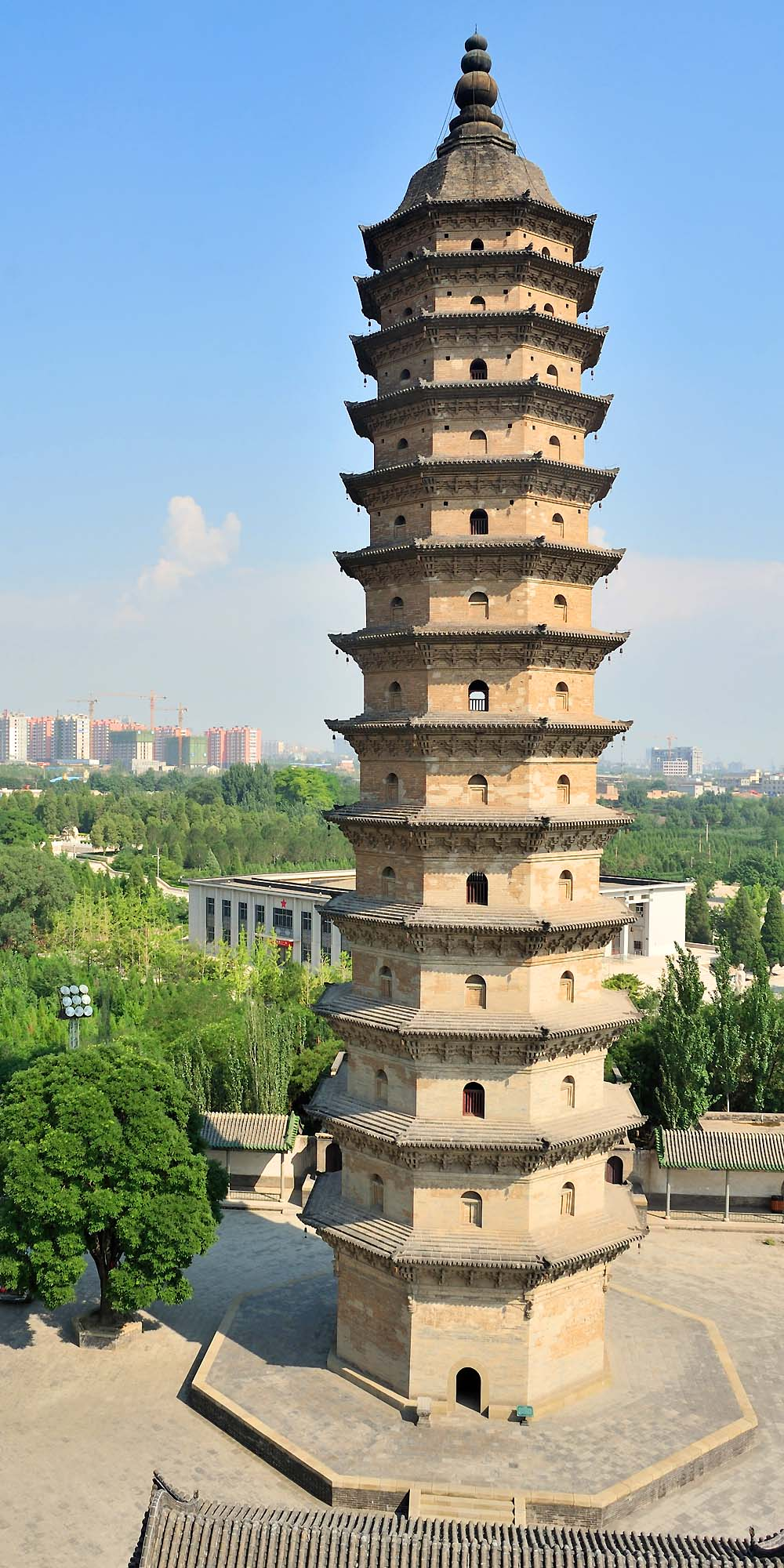
The east pagoda, seen from the west pagoda.

The pagodas are the tallest set of twin pagodas in China. They are both eight-cornered, with the lowest floor being comparatively taller than the rest, the size of the upper floors progressively decreasing. The West Pagoda is 54.78 meters tall, with the lowest floor's circumference being 4.16 meters. The pagoda's eaves are painted with emerald green glaze. The East Pagoda is 53.3 meters high, and the lowest floor's circumference is 4.36 meters. On top of the East pagoda are three magic gourds (宝葫芦), with the upper two parts being made of copper.

== Temple ==
The temple contains approximately 260 stone steles, as it is the location where stele from temples in the area that are no longer extant were moved. The temple grounds also contain many peony trees, one of which dates from the Ming Dynasty.
