= Jinci =

Temple complex in Shanxi, China

Coordinates: 37.7079°N 112.4424°E

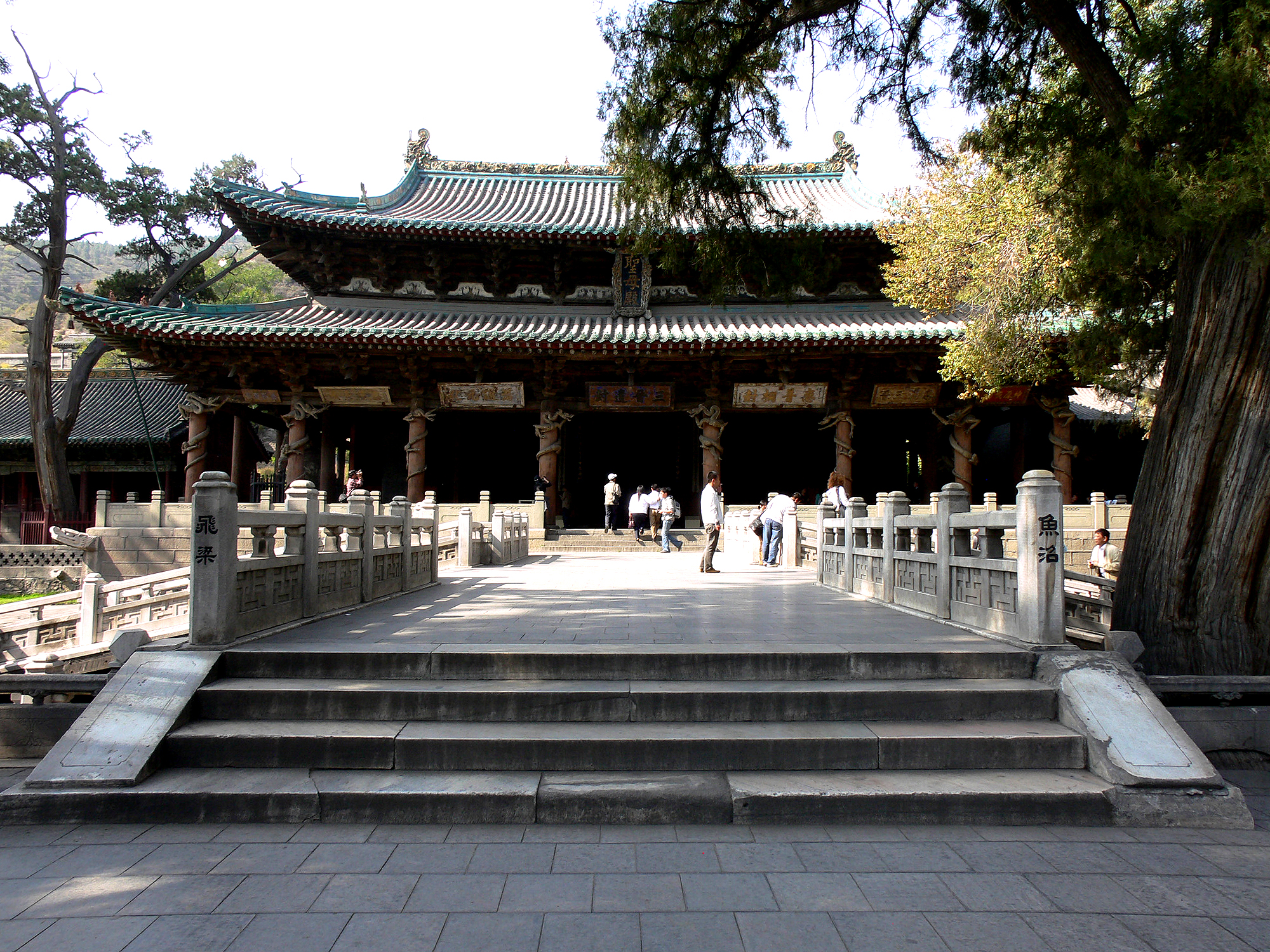
Hall of the Holy Mother

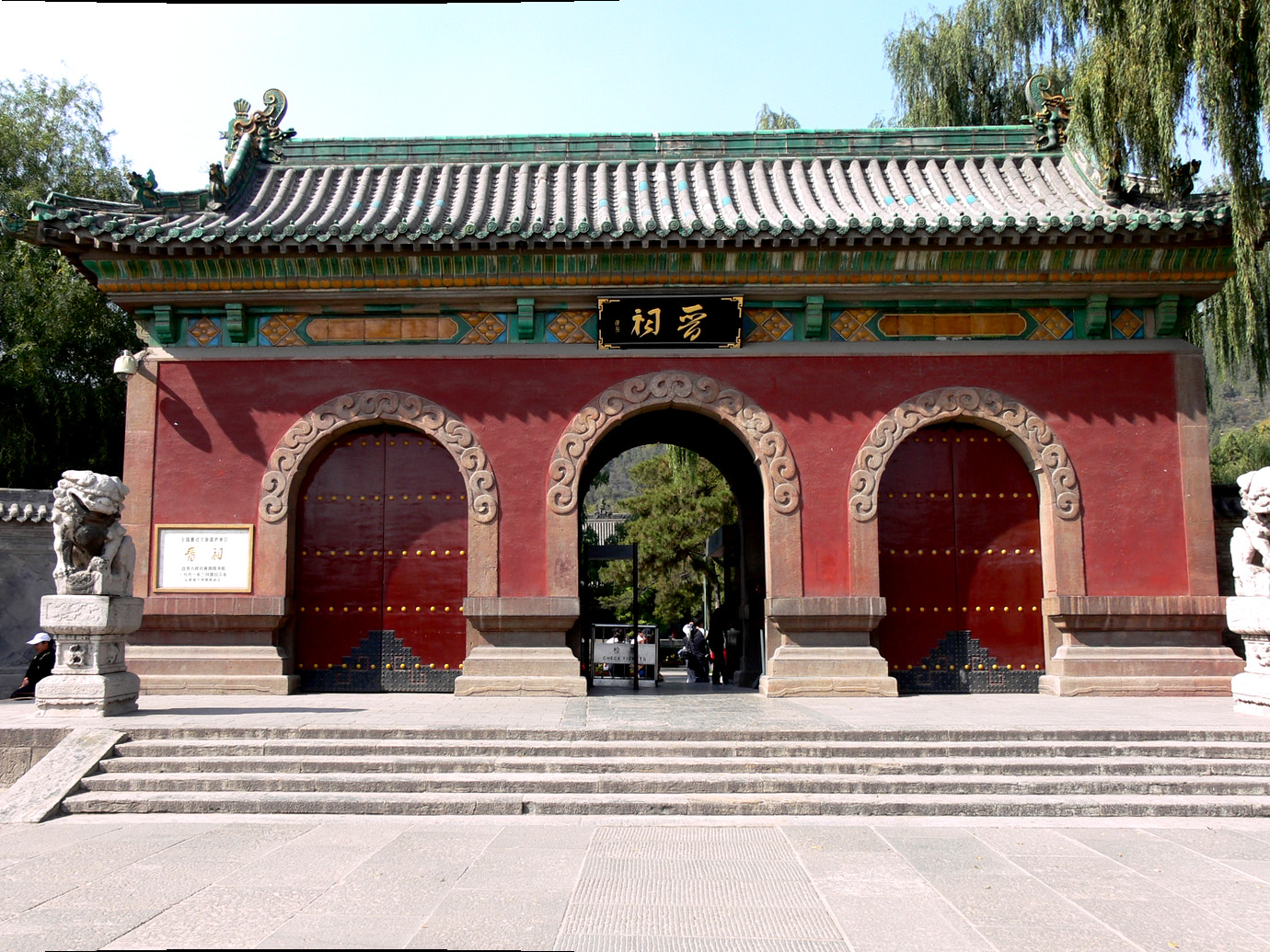
Entrance of the Jinci

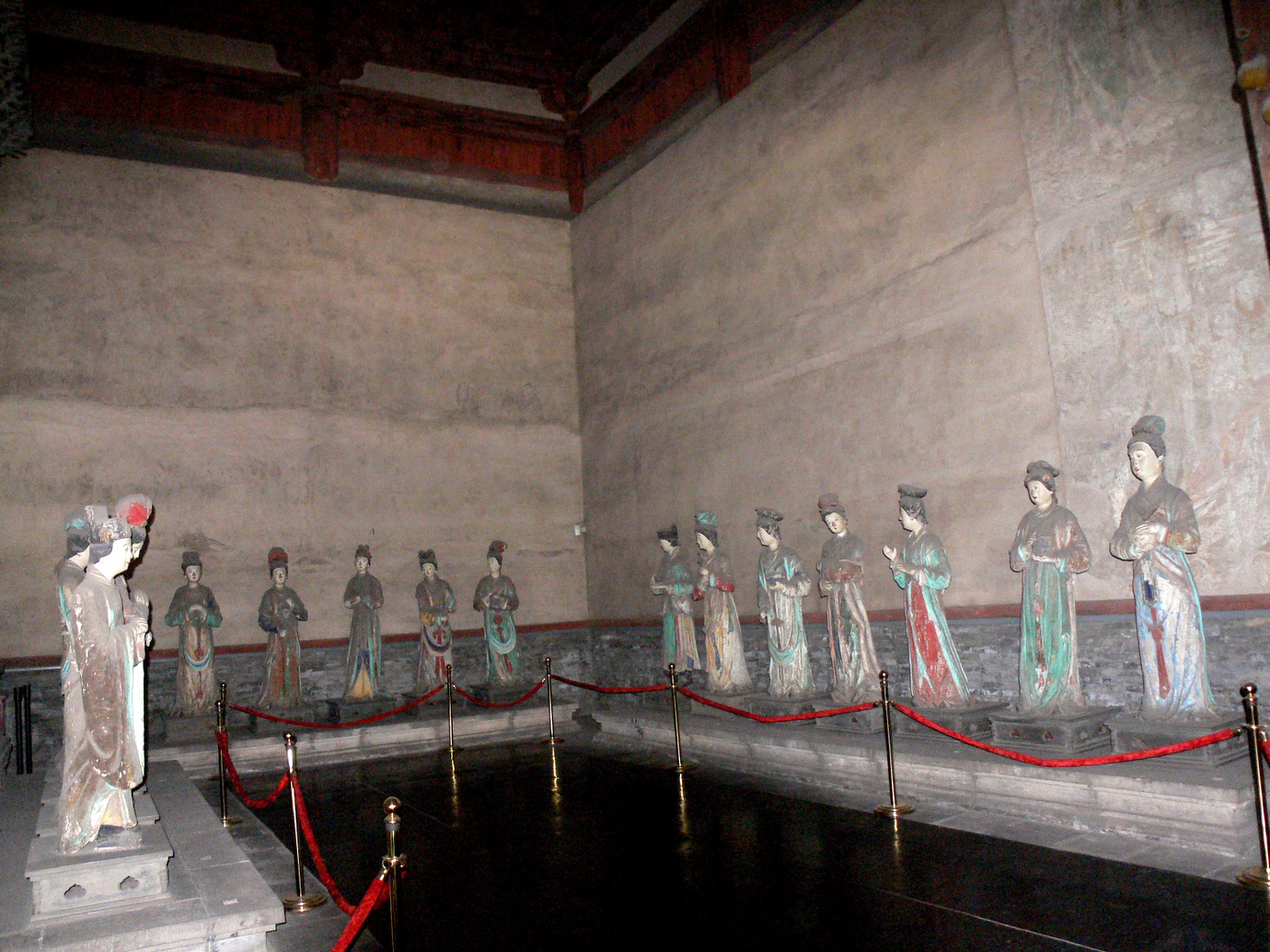
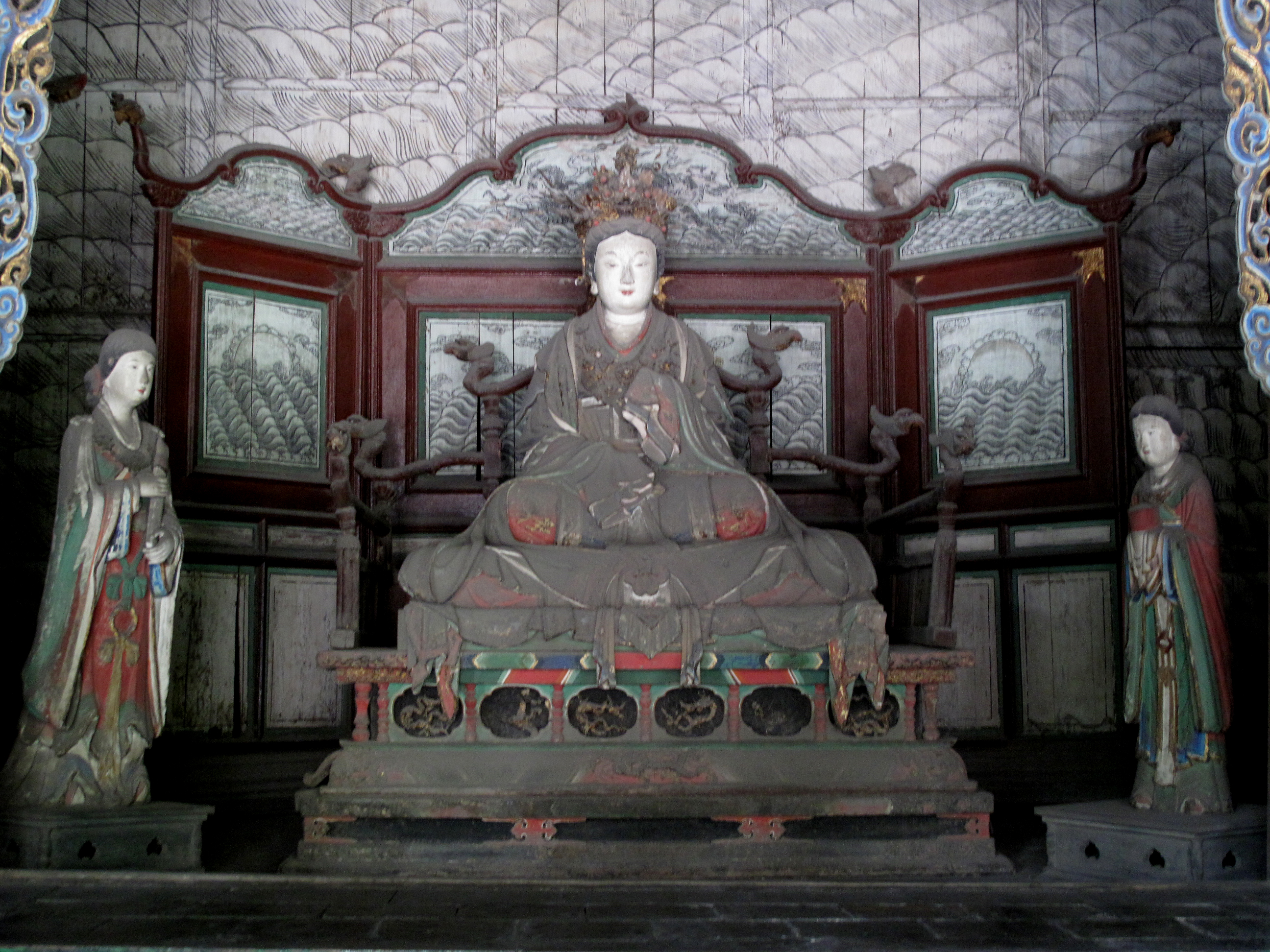
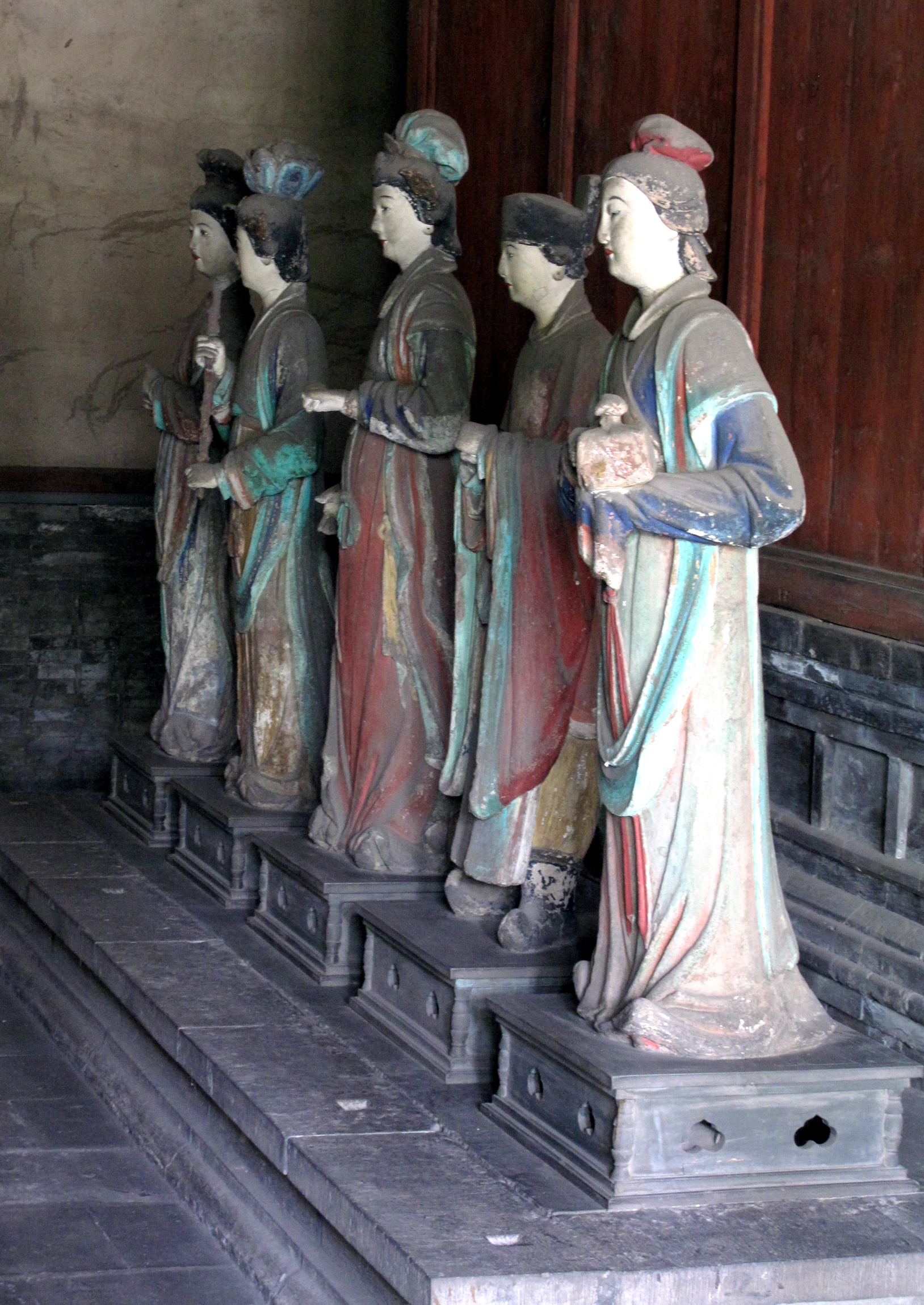
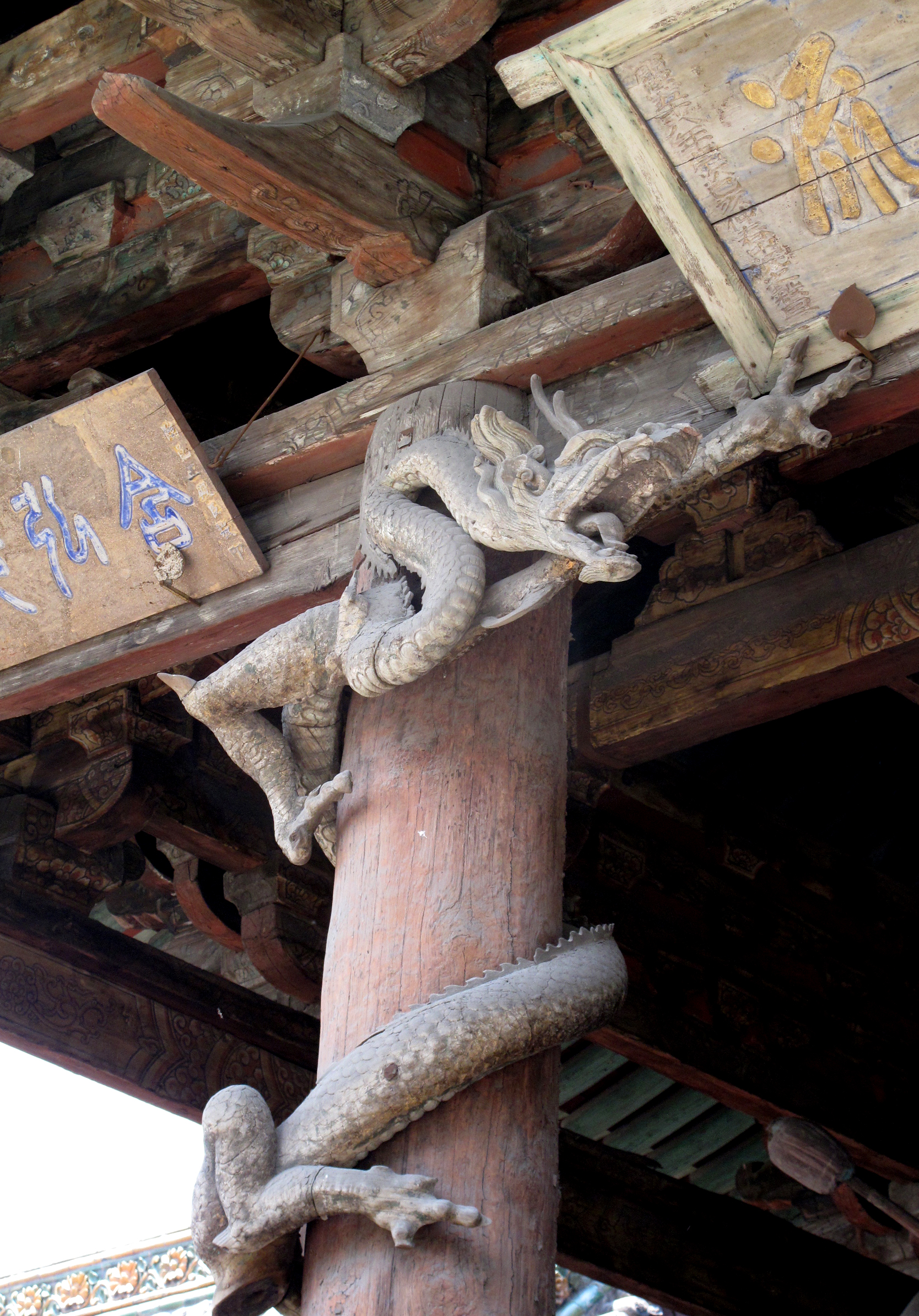
Song Dynasty statues and sculptures.

The Jinci or Jin Temple (晉祠) is the most prominent temple complex in Shanxi, China. It is located 16 miles (25 km) southwest of Taiyuan at the foot of Xuanweng Mountain at the Jin Springs. It was founded about 1,400 years ago and expanded during the following centuries, resulting in a diverse collection of more than 100 sculptures, buildings, terraces, and bridges.

The best known structure at Jinci is the Hall of the Holy Mother (圣母殿, Shèngmǔdiàn), which was constructed from 1023 to 1032 during the Song dynasty. It has carved wooden dragons coiled around the eight pillars that support its upward-curving double-eave roof. Inside the Hall of the Holy Mother are 43 Song-dynasty clay sculptures, including a seated central goddess and 42 life-sized female attendants arranged in realistic poses. The complex includes a classical garden with a 3,000-year-old cypress dating from the Zhou Dynasty. To the west of Hall of the Holy Mother is a temple dedicated to the deity Shuimu. Next to Jinci is the Wang Family Hall, a private villa built in 1532 for Wang Qiong, a high-ranking official during the Ming Dynasty.
