= Luoyang East railway station =

Railway station in Luoyang, China

Luoyangdong 洛阳东
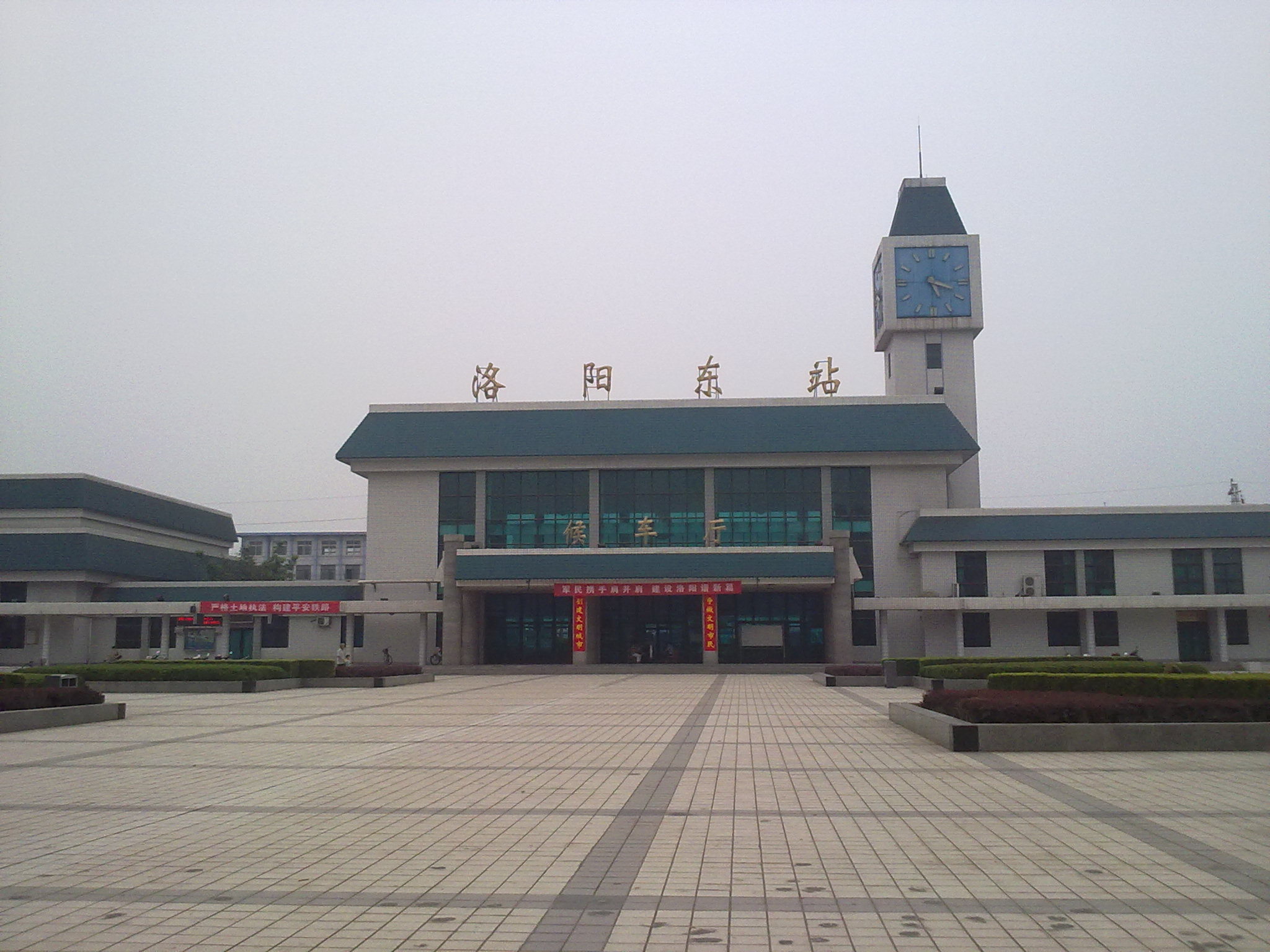

General information
- Other names: Luoyang East
- Location: 38 Datong Street; Chanhe Hui District, Luoyang, Henan; China
- Coordinates: 34.6864°N 112.4298°E
- Operator: CR Zhengzhou
- Lines: Jiaozuo–Liuzhou railway; Longhai Railway; Luoyang–Yiyang railway; Luoyang–Zhanjiang railway
- Platforms: 3 (1 side platform and 1 island platform)
- Tracks: 4

Other information
- Station code: 39125 (TMIS code); LDF (telegraph code); LYD (Pinyin code)
- Classification: Class 1 station (一等站)

History
- Opened: 1909
- Former names: Henan Fu (Chinese: 河南府)

Services
Preceding station	China Railway	Following station
Yanshi towards Lianyungang East	Longhai railway	Luoyang towards Lanzhou
Luoyang North towards Jiaozuo	Jiaozuo–Liuzhou railway	Guanlin towards Liuzhou
Location
- Location within Henan Location within China

Luoyangdong (Luoyang East) railway station (Chinese: 洛阳东站) is a railway station in Luoyang, Henan.

== History ==
Services at Luoyang East were suspended on 1 July 2020.

== See also ==
- Luoyang railway station
- Luoyang Longmen railway station
