= Wuzhi railway station =

Railway station in Jiaozuo, China

Wuzhi 武陟
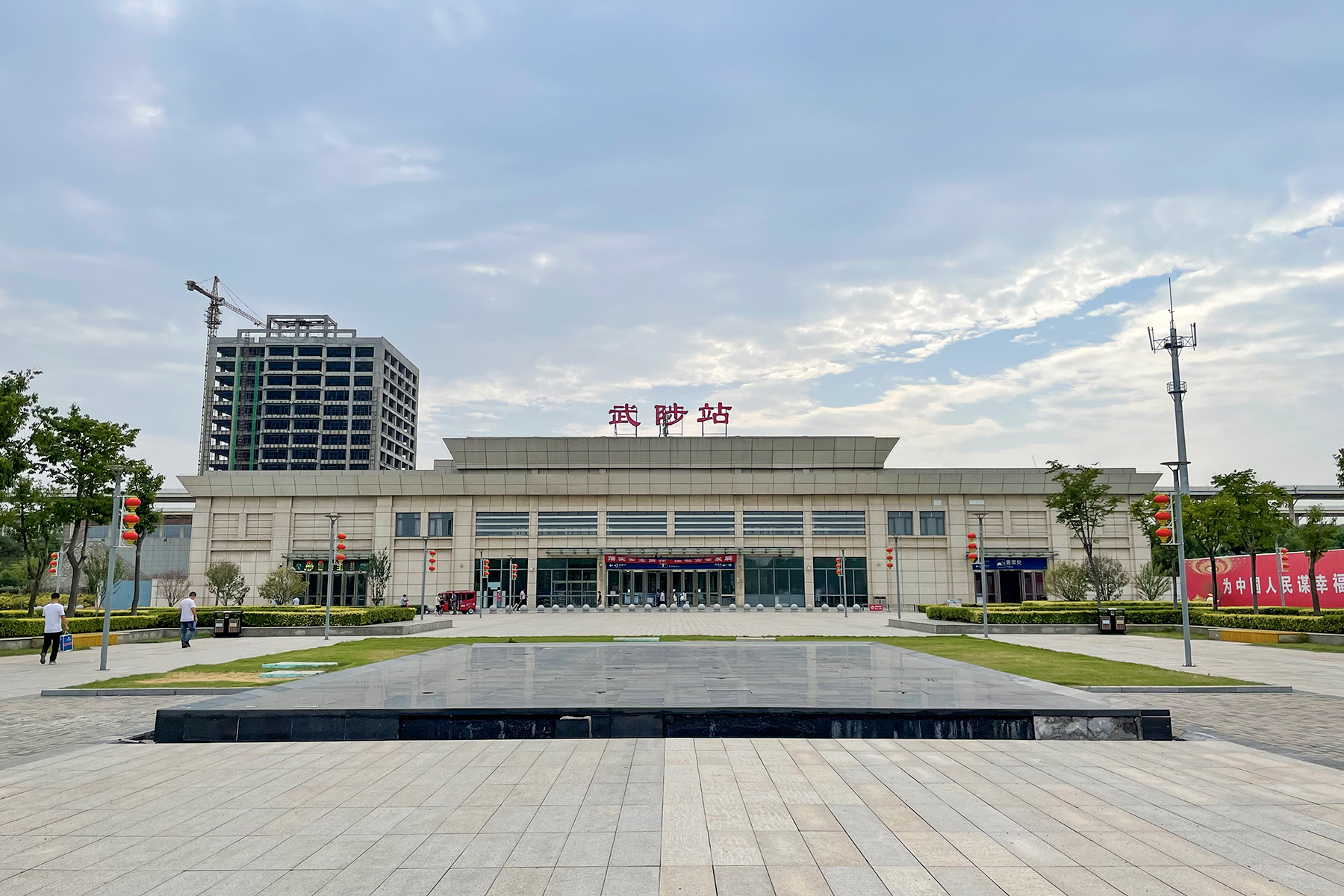
- Wuzhi Railway Station

General information
- Location: Wuzhi, Jiaozuo, Henan; China
- Coordinates: 35.0894°N 113.4459°E
- Operated by: CR Zhengzhou
- Line: Zhengzhou–Jiaozuo intercity railway
- Platforms: 2
- Tracks: 4
- Connections: Bus

History
- Opened: 2015

Services
Preceding station	China Railway High-speed	Following station
Huanghejingqu towards Zhengzhou	Zhengzhou–Jiaozuo intercity railway	Xiuwu West towards Jiaozuo
Location

Wuzhi railway station (Chinese: 武陟站) is a station on Zhengzhou–Jiaozuo intercity railway in Wuzhi County, Jiaozuo, Henan, China.
