= Yueshan railway station =

Railway station in Jiaozuo, China

Coordinates: 35.2107°N 113.0487°E

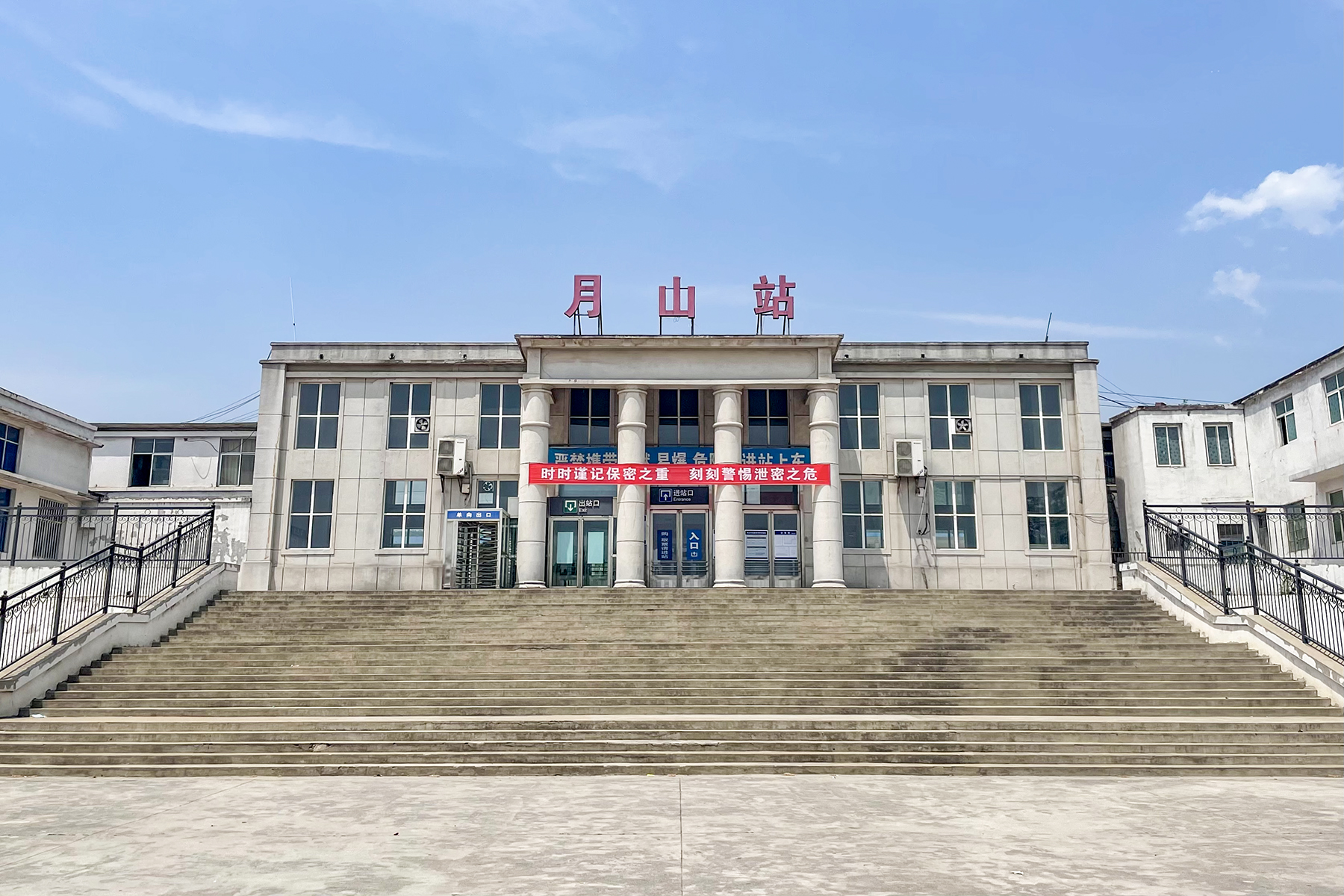
Yueshan Railway Station

Yueshan railway station (Chinese: 月山站; pinyin: Yuèshān zhàn) is a railway station in Bo'ai County, Jiaozuo, Henan Province, China. Several railways in northern China intersect at Yueshan, including the Taiyuan–Jiaozuo, Jiaozuo–Liuzhou and Xinxiang–Yueshan railways. The Houma–Yueshan railway merges into the Jiaozuo–Liuzhou railway west of Yueshan at the Liandong railway station in Jiyuan.

Preceding station	China Railway	Following station
Jingcheng towards Taiyuan	Taiyuan–Jiaozuo railway	Jiaozuo Terminus
Jiaozuo Terminus	Jiaozuo–Liuzhou railway	Jiyuan towards Liuzhou
Jiaozuo towards Xinxiang	Xinxiang–Yueshan railway	Terminus
