= Diyangping railway station =

Railway station in Hunan, China

Coordinates: 26.2787963°N 109.6129060°E

Diyangping 地陽坪站

General information
- Location: Xianxi Town, Tongdao Dong Autonomous County, Hunan; China
- Operated by: China Railway Corporation
- Line: Jiaozuo–Liuzhou

Other information
- Station code: 44885 (TMIS); DQQ (Telegraph code); DYP (Pinyin code)

History
- Opened: 1978
Location

Diyangping railway station (Chinese: 地陽坪站) is a railway station in Xianxi Town, Tongdao Dong Autonomous County, Hunan, built in 1978. It is on the Jiaozuo–Liuzhou railway.

| Preceding station | China Railway | Following station |
|---|---|---|
| Tongdao towards Jiaozuo | Jiaozuo–Liuzhou railway | Tangbao towards Liuzhou |
