= NYF (disambiguation) =

NYF may refer to:

- Nepal Youth Foundation, a U.S.-based 501(c)(3) non-profit organization
- National Youth Festival (India), an annual gathering of youth with various activities
- nyf, the ISO 639-3 code for Giryama, a variant of Mijikenda language
- New York Festivals, a collection of related annual arts and media awards
- New York State Fair station, the Amtrak station code NYF
- Nanyangzhai railway station, the telegraph code NYF
