= Boai =

Boai or BOAI may refer to:

- Budapest Open Access Initiative, conference convened by the Open Society Institute in 2001
- Bo'ai County, in Henan, China
