= HHQ =

HHQ may refer to:

- HHQ, the IATA code for Hua Hin Airport, Prachuap Khiri Khan Province, Thailand
- HHQ, the Pinyin code for Huanghejingqu railway station, Zhengzhou, Henan, China
