= Zhengjiao Intercity Railway Yellow River Bridge =

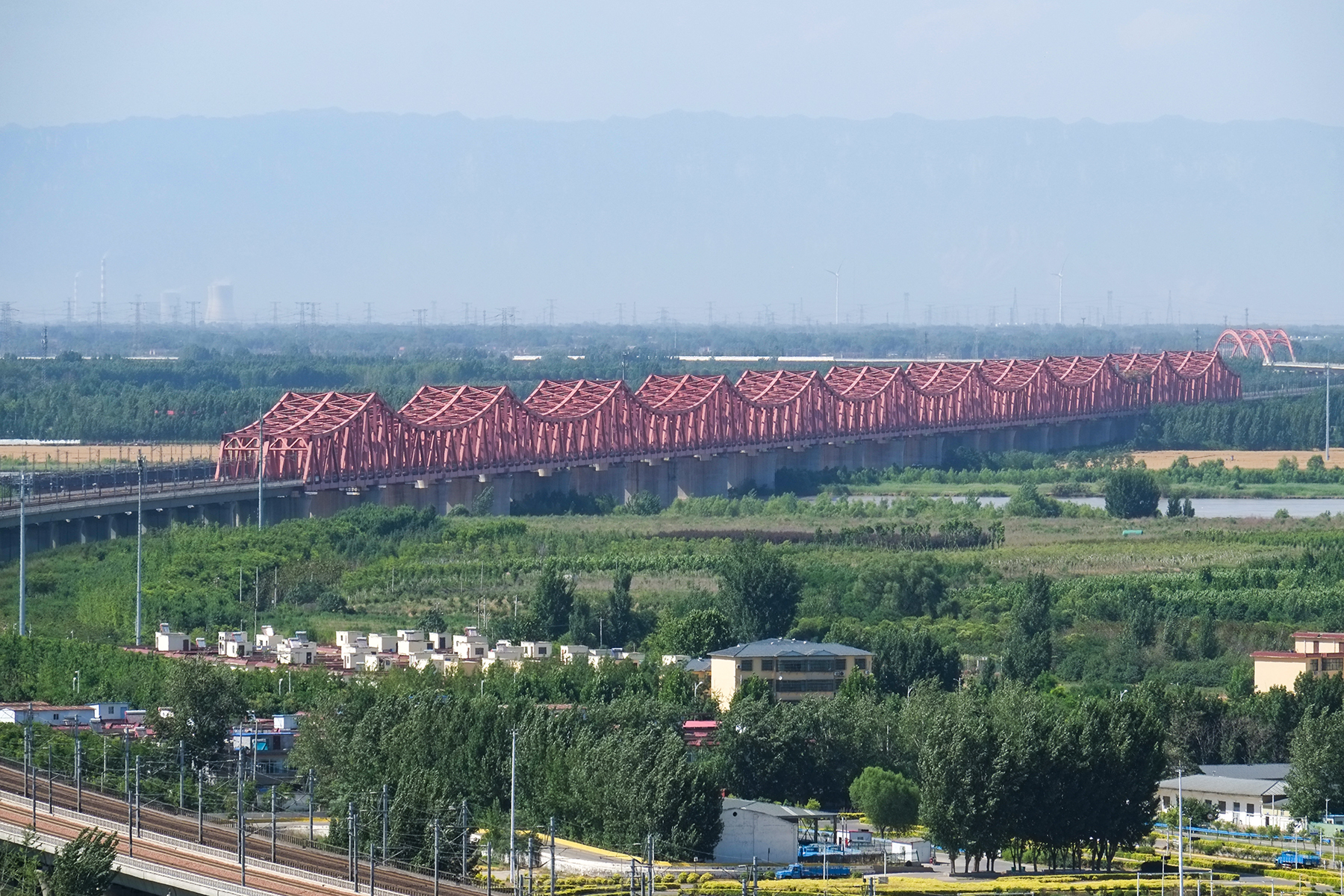
- Coordinates: 34.9644°N 113.5228°E
- Carries: Beijing–Guangzhou railway; Zhengzhou–Jiaozuo intercity railway
- Crosses: Yellow River
- Locale: Henan, China

Rail characteristics
- No. of tracks: 4

History
- Opened: 26 May 2014

Zhengjiao Intercity Railway Yellow River Bridge (Chinese: 郑焦城际铁路黄河大桥) is a four-track railway bridge in Henan, China, across the Yellow River. It carries the Beijing–Guangzhou railway and the Zhengzhou–Jiaozuo intercity railway.

== History ==
Construction on the bridge began in October 2010. It was built to carry the new Zhengzhou–Jiaozuo intercity railway and as a replacement for the Jiayingguan Yellow River Railway Bridge on the Beijing–Guangzhou railway, located between 110 and 190 metres upstream. On 16 May 2014, the bridge was opened for trains on the Beijing–Guangzhou railway. The Zhengzhou–Jiaozuo intercity railway opened on 26 June 2015.

== Specification ==
The tracks for the Beijing–Guangzhou railway have a maxmimum speed of 160 kilometres per hour (99 miles per hour) and the tracks for the Zhengzhou–Jiaozuo intercity railway have a maximum speed of 250 kilometres per hour (160 miles per hour).
