= Houma–Yueshan railway =

Railway line in China

The Houma–Yueshan railway or Houyue railway (simplified Chinese: 侯月铁路; traditional Chinese: 侯月鐵路; pinyin: Hóuyuè tiělù), is a railway line in northern China between Houma in Shanxi Province and the railway junction of Yueshan in Bo'ai County of neighboring Henan Province. The railway has a total length of 252 km (157 mi) and was built from January 1990 to November 1995. The line entered into operations in January 1996 and forms part of the southern rail corridor for the transport of coal from Shanxi Province.

== Route ==
In the west, the Houyue railway commences branches off of the Datong–Puzhou railway at Houma in southwestern Shanxi and runs due east through Yicheng and Qinshui to the Qin River, in south central Shanxi, and follows the river south, past Yancheng into Henan. At the Liandong railway station near Jiyuan, the line joins the Jiaozuo-Liuzhou railway and follows that line east to the Yueshan railway station in Bo'ai County.

== Rail connections ==
- Houma: Houma–Xi'an railway
- Jiyuan (Liandong railway station): Jiaozuo–Liuzhou railway to Yueshan

== See also ==
- List of railways in China
