= Zhang Ti'an =

Chinese general (1897–1974)

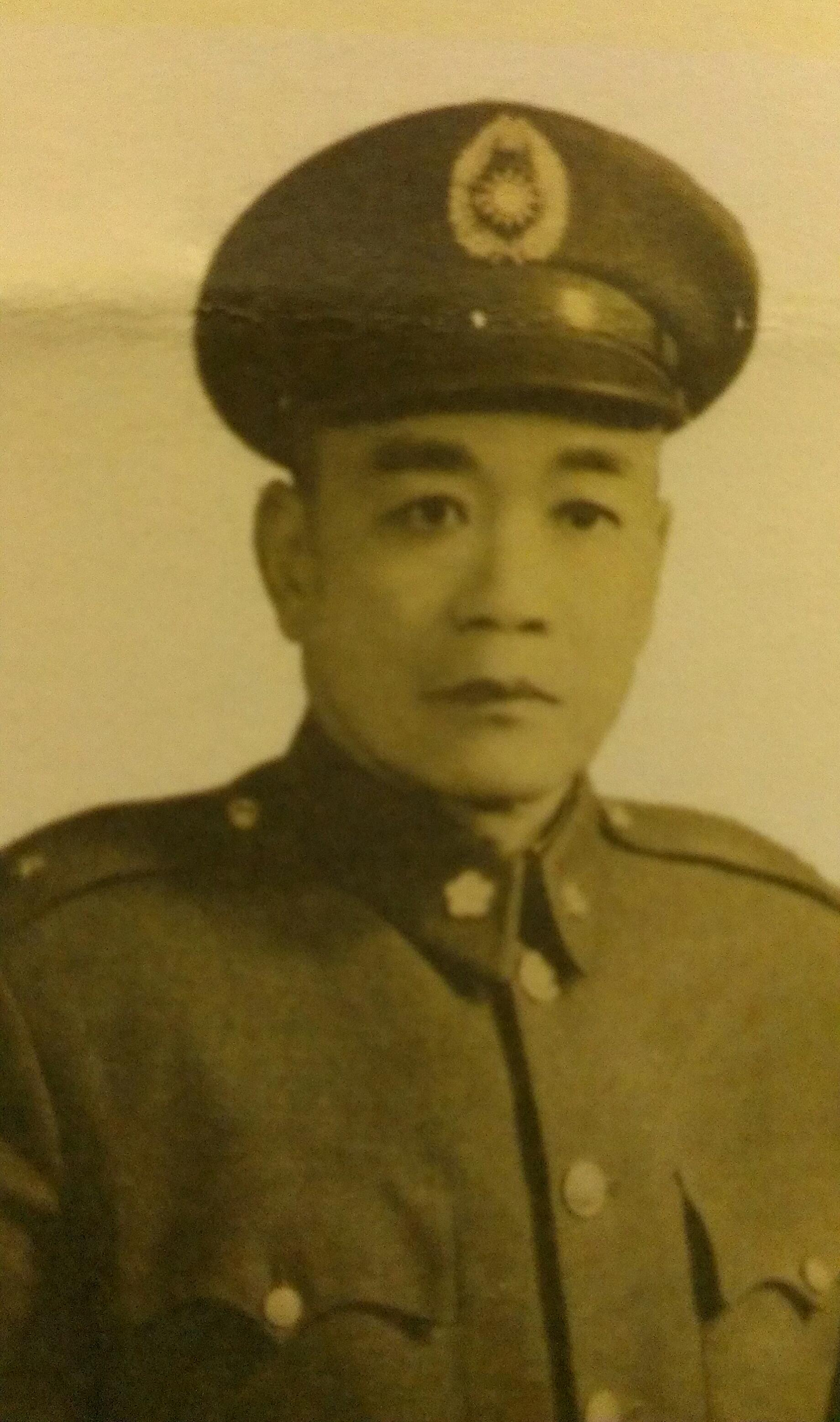
- Born: 1897; Bo'ai County, Henan, Qing dynasty
- Died: 11 October 1974; Taiwan
- Allegiance: Republic of China
- Service / branch: (Republic of China (1912–1949)) National Revolutionary Army
- Battles / wars: Second Sino-Japanese War; Chinese Civil War

Zhang Ti'an (1897 – 11 October 1974), courtesy name: Zijing, also known as Ziqing, was a general of the Republic of China.

== Life ==
Zhang Ti'an was born in 1897 in Bo'ai County, Henan. In his early years, he trained regiment defense in his hometown. When the Japanese army invaded China, Zhang Ti'an, his wife Zhao Lanhua, and others formed a guerrilla army, dealt with the Japanese army, and successfully contained the Japanese army. Later, the division was reorganized into the Ninth Division, where he served as general and division commander. A graduate of Whampoa Military Academy, he participated in the Battle of Tangyin. After the founding of the People's Republic of China, he fled to Taiwan. Because he was an upright official, he ran the "True Peiping Restaurant" on Zhonghua Road, Taipei City, to make a living. In 1966, he co-founded Minghsin University of Science and Technology with four party-state elders, Wang Zongshan, Hao Lixu, Li Hongchao and Zhang Fengxi.
