= YSH =

YSH may refer to:

- Smiths Falls-Montague Airport (IATA code)
- Yanshi railway station (Pinyin station code), China
- Youth Speaks Hawaii, a program of Hawai'i nonprofit Pacific Tongues
