= Huanghejingqu railway station =

Railway station in Zhengzhou, China

Huanghejingqu 黄河景区
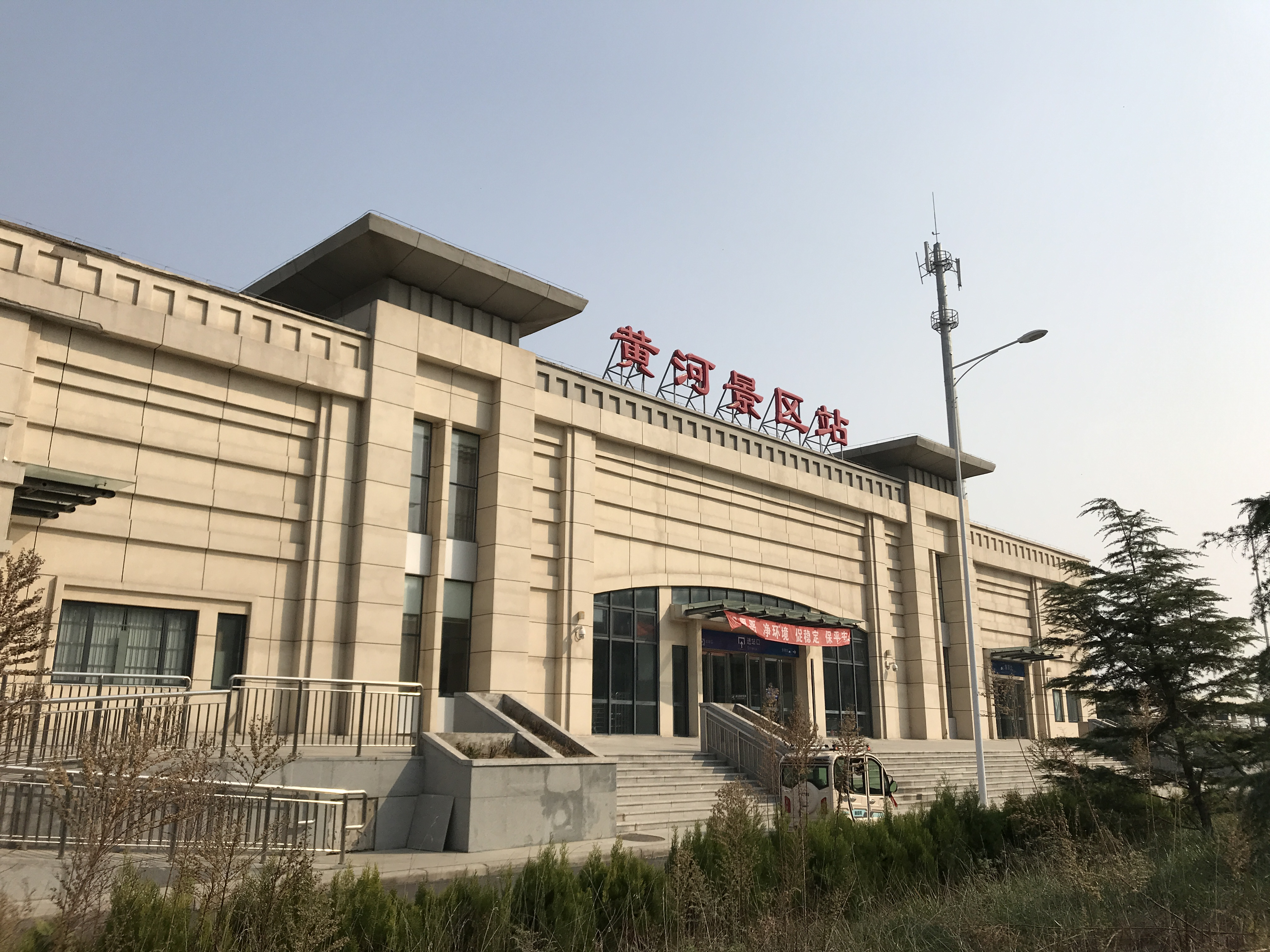

General information
- Location: Huiji District, Zhengzhou, Henan; China
- Coordinates: 34.9321°N 113.5272°E
- Operator: CR Zhengzhou
- Line: Zhengzhou–Jiaozuo intercity railway
- Platforms: 2
- Tracks: 4
- Connections: Bus

Other information
- Station code: 21751 (TMIS code); HCF (telegraph code); HHQ (Pinyin code)

History
- Opened: 2015
Location
- Location within Zhengzhou Location within Henan

Huanghejingqu railway station (Chinese: 黄河景区站; pinyin: Huánghéjǐngqū zhàn; lit. 'Yellow River Scenic Area railway station') is a station on Zhengzhou–Jiaozuo intercity railway. The station is located on the south bank of the Yellow River, in Huiji District, Zhengzhou, Henan, China.

== Station layout ==
The station has 2 side platforms and 4 tracks. The station building is to the west of the platforms.

Preceding station	China Railway High-speed	Following station
Nanyangzhai towards Zhengzhou	Zhengzhou–Jiaozuo intercity railway	Wuzhi towards Jiaozuo
