= Taiyuan–Jiaozuo railway =

Railway line in China

- Freight trains travel on the Taiyuan-Jiaozuo railway

Overview
- Native name: 太焦铁路
- Owner: China Railway
- Termini: Taiyuan South; Jiaozuo

Technical
- Line length: 434 km (270 mi)
- Character: main line
- Track gauge: 1,435 mm (4 ft 8 1/2 in) standard gauge
- Electrification: Non-electrified (Xiuwen–Changzhi North); 25 kV, 50 Hz AC overhead (Changzhi North to Yueshan)
- Operating speed: 120 km/h (75 mph)

The Taiyuan–Jiaozuo or Taijiao railway (simplified Chinese: 太焦铁路; traditional Chinese: 太焦鐵路; pinyin: tàijiāo tiělù), is a major trunkline railroad in northern China. The railway is named after its terminal cities, Taiyuan in Shanxi Province and Jiaozuo in Henan Province. The line, 434 km (270 mi) in length, lies mainly in Shanxi, running from Taiyuan in the center of the province to Jincheng in the southeast corner. Jiaozuo is just across the southern border from Shanxi in northern Henan. The Taijiao railway was built from 1970 to 1978. Major cities and towns along route include Taiyuan, Yuci, Jinzhong, Changzhi and Jincheng.

== Rail connections ==
- Taiyuan: Datong–Puzhou railway, Shijiazhuang–Taiyuan railway
- Changzhi: Handan–Changzhi railway, Shanxi–Henan–Shandong railway
- Jiaozuo: (Yueshan station): Jiaozuo–Liuzhou railway, Xinxiang–Yueshan railway

== See also ==
- List of railways in China
- Taiyuan–Jiaozuo high-speed railway
