= EXF =

EXF, exf, or ExF may refer to:

== exf ==
- .exf, file format used to separately store EXIF data and example of a sidecar file

== ExF ==
- ExF, a variant of the Renault Energy engine

== EXF ==
- CrossFit EXF, team in the 2024 CrossFit Games
- Project EXF, a limited production of MG F / MG TF automobiles
- EXF, telegraph code for Xiuwu West railway station, China
- EXF, ICAO airline code for Eximflight, a Mexican airline
- EXF, abbreviation for Extreme Fun TV, replacement of TLC (TV network) in South Korea
