= Nanyangzhai railway station =

Railway station in Zhengzhou, China

Nanyangzhai 南阳寨
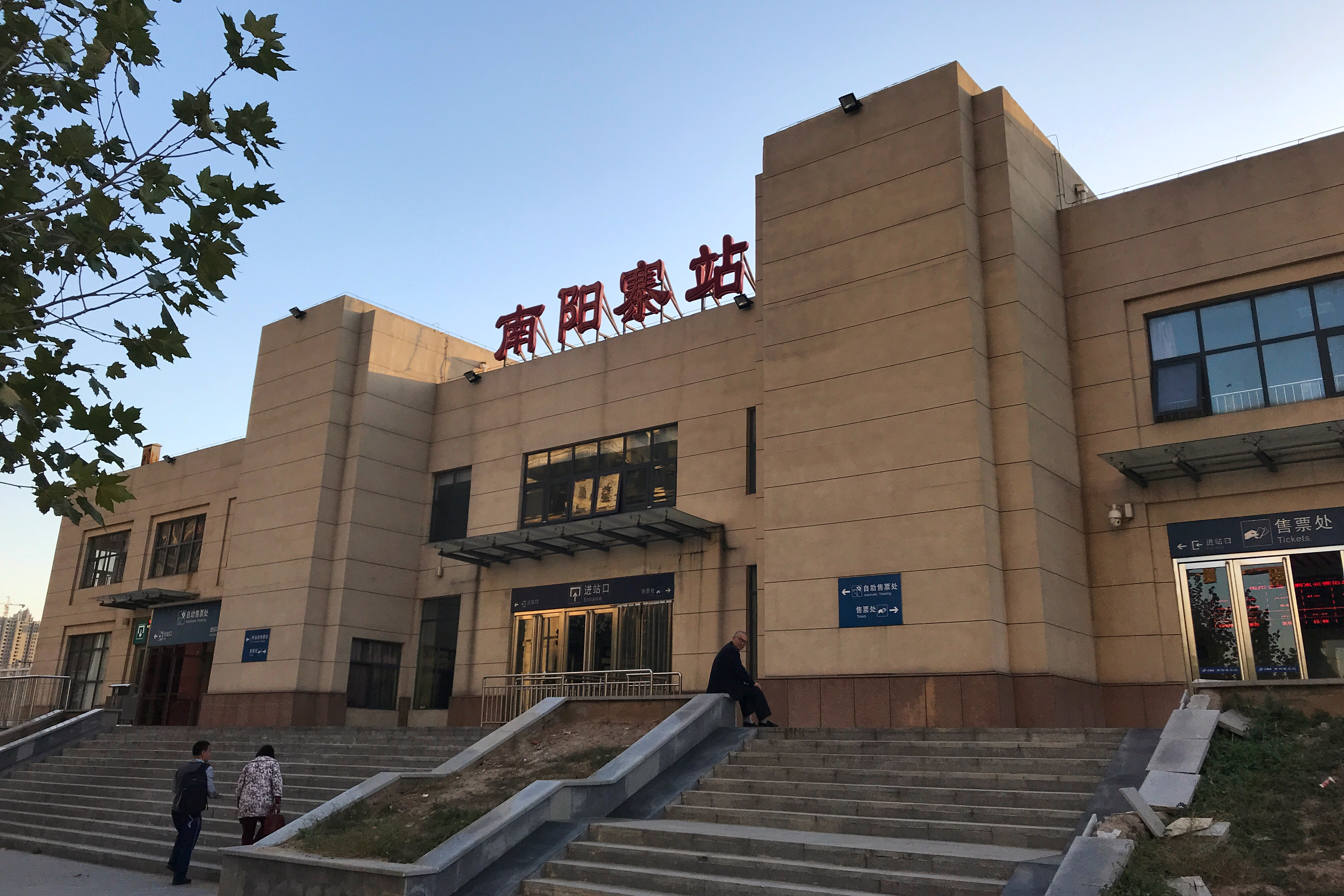

General information
- Location: Tiedong Road; Huiji District, Zhengzhou, Henan; China
- Coordinates: 34.8156°N 113.6109°E
- Operator: CR Zhengzhou
- Lines: Beijing–Guangzhou railway; Zhengzhou–Jiaozuo intercity railway
- Platforms: 2
- Tracks: 5
- Connections: Bus

Construction
- Structure type: At-level

Other information
- Station code: 21749 (TMIS code); NYF (telegraph code); NYZ (Pinyin code)
- Classification: Class 3 station

History
- Opened: 1919
Location
- Location within Zhengzhou Location within Henan

Nanyangzhai railway station (Chinese: 南阳寨站) is a station on the Beijing–Guangzhou railway and Zhengzhou–Jiaozuo intercity railway. The station is located in Huiji District, Zhengzhou, Henan, China.

== History ==
The station was opened in 1919 as a station on the Beijing–Guangzhou railway.

In 2015, with the opening of Zhengzhou–Jiaozuo intercity railway, the station began to serve as a station for intercity trains.

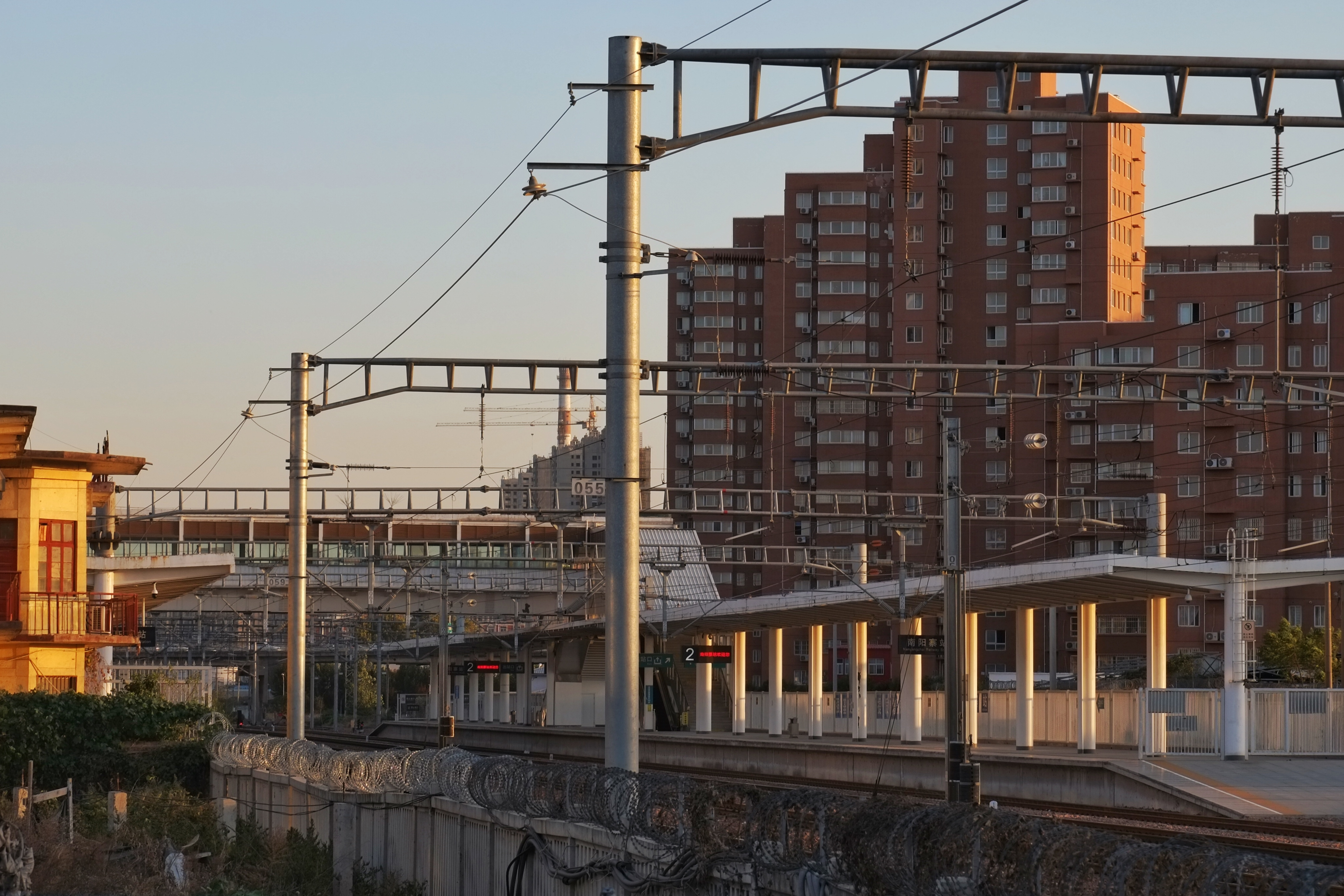
The station view from north

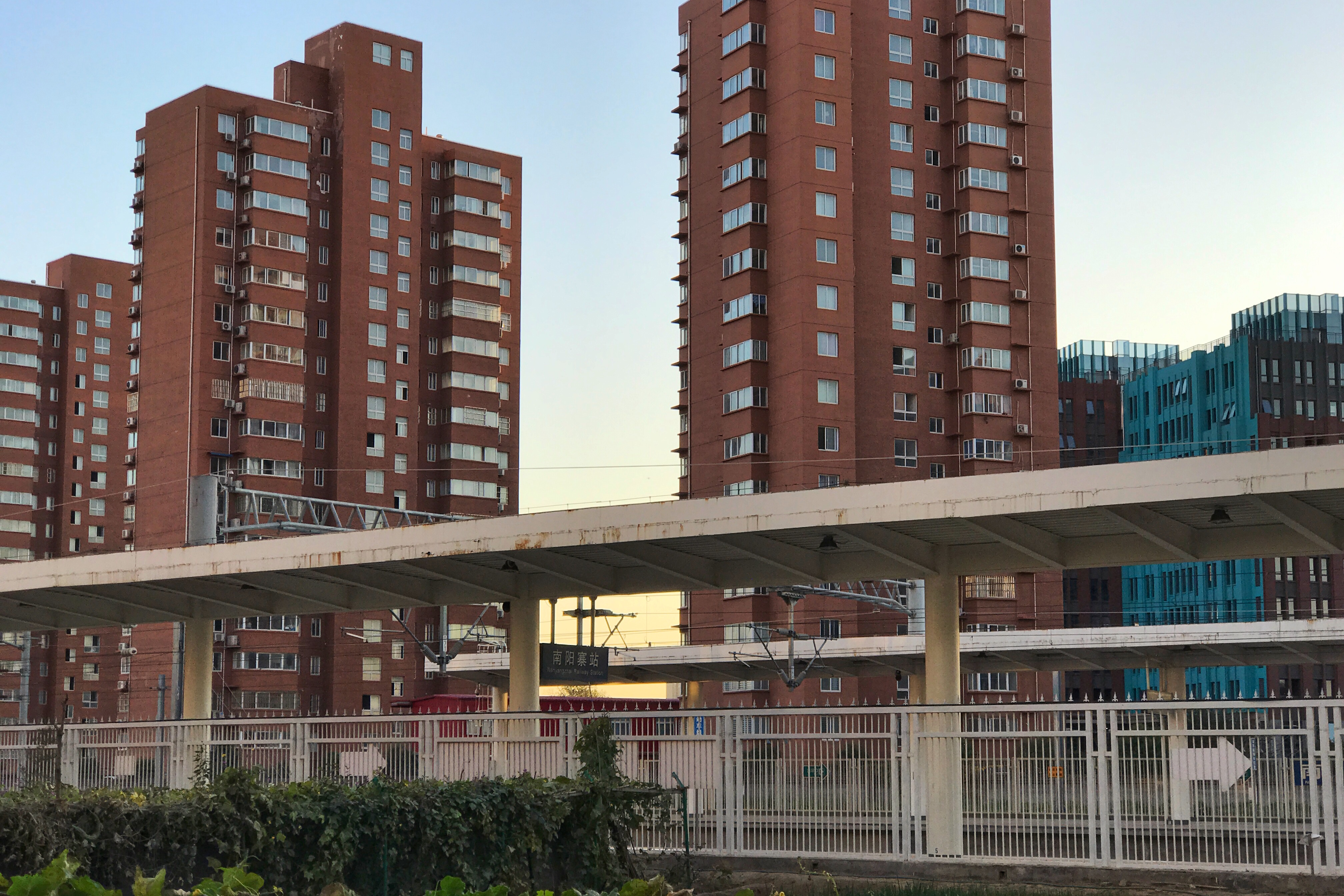
Platforms of the station

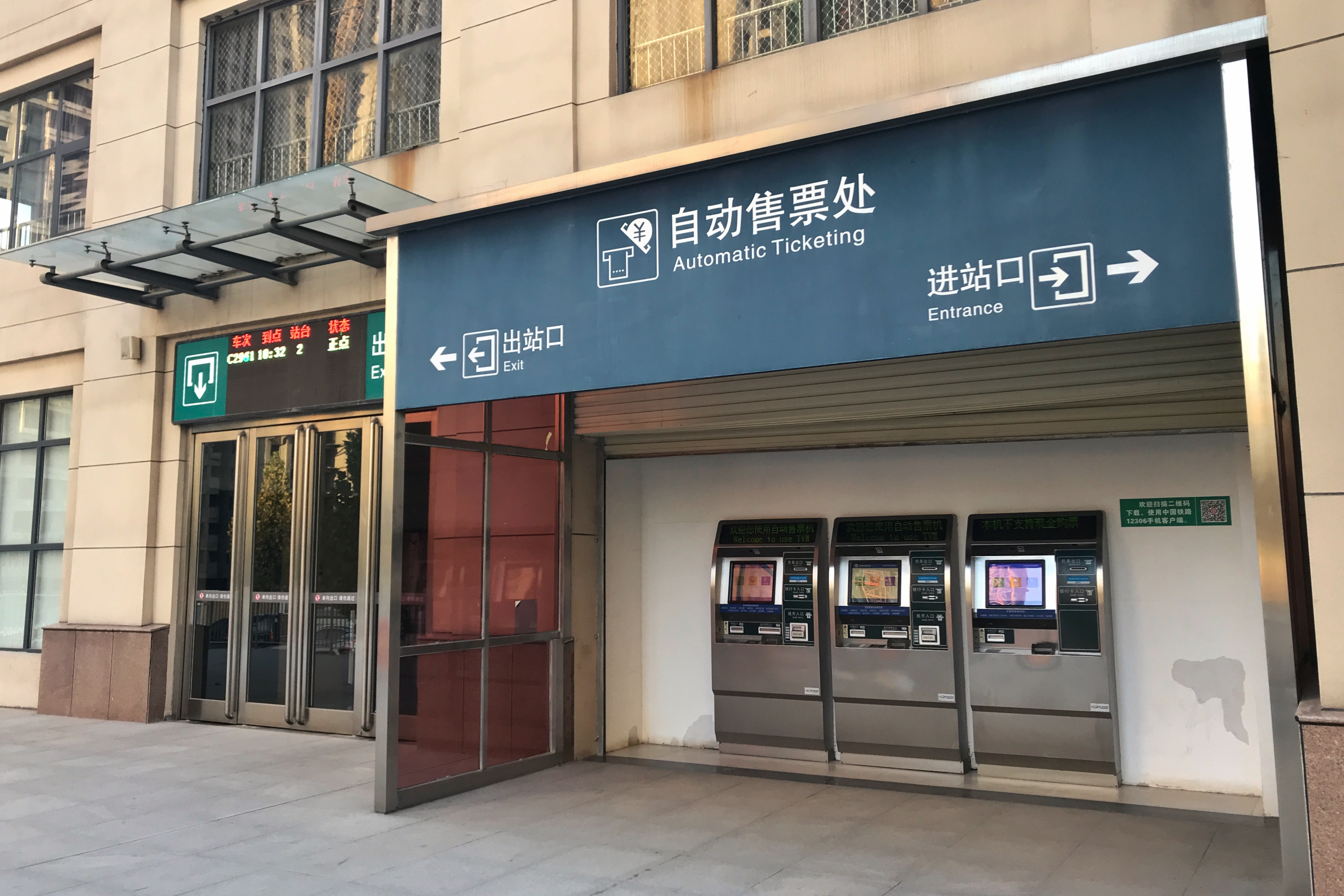
Ticket vending machines

Preceding station	China Railway High-speed	Following station
Zhengzhou Terminus	Zhengzhou–Jiaozuo intercity railway	Huanghejingqu towards Jiaozuo
Preceding station	China Railway	Following station
Dongshuangqiao towards Beijing West	Beijing–Guangzhou railway	Haitangsi towards Guangzhou
