= Xinxiang–Yueshan railway =

Railway line in China

The Xinxiang–Yueshan railway or Xinyue railway (simplified Chinese: 新月铁路; traditional Chinese: 新月鐵路; pinyin: Xīnyuè tiělù), is a railway line in northern China between Yueshan railway station in Bo'ai County and Xinxiang railway station in Xinxiang. The entire line, 79.8 km (50 mi) in length, is located in Henan Province and serves as a major conduit for the shipment of coal from Shanxi Province.

== History ==
The history of the Xinxiang–Yueshan railway begins with the Daokou–Qinghua railway of the early 20th century. In 1898, the Qing government granted a concession to Britain to build a railway to transport coal in northern Henan Province. Construction began in 1902 on a line from Qinghua Township in present-day Bo'ai County to Daokou Township in Hua County. The line, completed in 1906, was 149.5 km in length and spanned Xun, Hua, Ji, Xinxiang, Huojia, Xiuwu and Qinyang counties. The Daoqing railway entered into operation in 1907 and was extended further west toward Meng County (modern-day Mengzhou) in 1920. Work stopped at Chenzhuang in 1925.

During the Second Sino-Japanese War, the Daoqing railway was seized by the invading Japanese in February 1938. In the fall of 1938, the Eighth Route Army led by Chen Geng launched repeated attacks to sabotage tracks and halt traffic on the line. The occupying Japanese forces removed track from the eastern section of the line between Daokou and Liyuantun to build the Kaifeng–Xinxiang railway. In January 1945, the Eighth Route Army launched the Battle of Daoqing and after more than 70 days of fighting, destroyed the Xinxiang-Daokou section of the line. During the Chinese Civil War, Jiaozuo and Xinxiang were captured by the People's Liberation Army in May 1949 and the western section of the Daokou–Qinghua railway was rebuilt and renamed the Xinhuai railway.

In subsequent decades, most of the formerly western section became the Xinxiang–Jiaozuo railway and Jiaozuo–Liuzhou railway. The Xinixiang–Jiaozuo railway is now known as the Xinxiang–Yueshan railway. The Xinyue railway was electrified from 2001 to 2003. In December 2010, construction began on the construction of a second pair of dual-track for the Xinyue railway.

== Rail connections ==
- Xinxiang: Xinxiang–Yanzhou railway
- Yueshan: Jiaozuo–Liuzhou railway, Taiyuan–Jiaozuo railway

== See also ==
- List of railways in China
