= Yuquan Subdistrict, Jiyuan =

Yuquan Subdistrict 玉泉街道
- Subdistrict
- Location in Henan
- Coordinates: 35°6′53″N 112°34′26″E
- Country: People's Republic of China
- Province: Henan
- Sub-prefectural city: Jiyuan
- Time zone: UTC+8 (China Standard)

Yuquan Subdistrict (Chinese: 玉泉街道; pinyin: Yùquán Jiēdào) is a subdistrict in Jiyuan, Henan, China. As of 2020, it administers the following 25 residential neighborhoods:

- Yaqiao (亚桥)
- Beiyantou (北堰头)
- Xishuitun (西水屯)
- Beishuitun (北水屯)
- Nanshuitun (南水屯)
- Gangtou (堽头)
- Ximatou (西马头)
- Zhongmatou (中马头)
- Dongmatou (东马头)
- Miaodian (苗店)
- Jiuhezhuang (旧河庄)
- Dongguo Road (东郭路)
- Xiguo Road (西郭路)
- Wangzhuang (王庄)
- Shiniu New Village (石牛新村)
- Baigou New Village (白沟新村)
- Liuzhuang New Village (刘庄新村)
- Lujialing New Village (陆家岭新村)
- Zhuyu New Village (竹峪新村)
- Duanzhuang (段庄)
- Nanyantou (南堰头)
- Yaqiao Community (亚桥社区)
- Quanshuiwan Community (泉水湾社区)
- Quanxing Community (泉兴社区)
- Quanhui Community (泉惠社区)

== See also ==
- List of township-level divisions of Henan
