= Zhicheng Yangtze River Bridge =

Zhicheng Yangtze River Bridge 枝城长江大桥
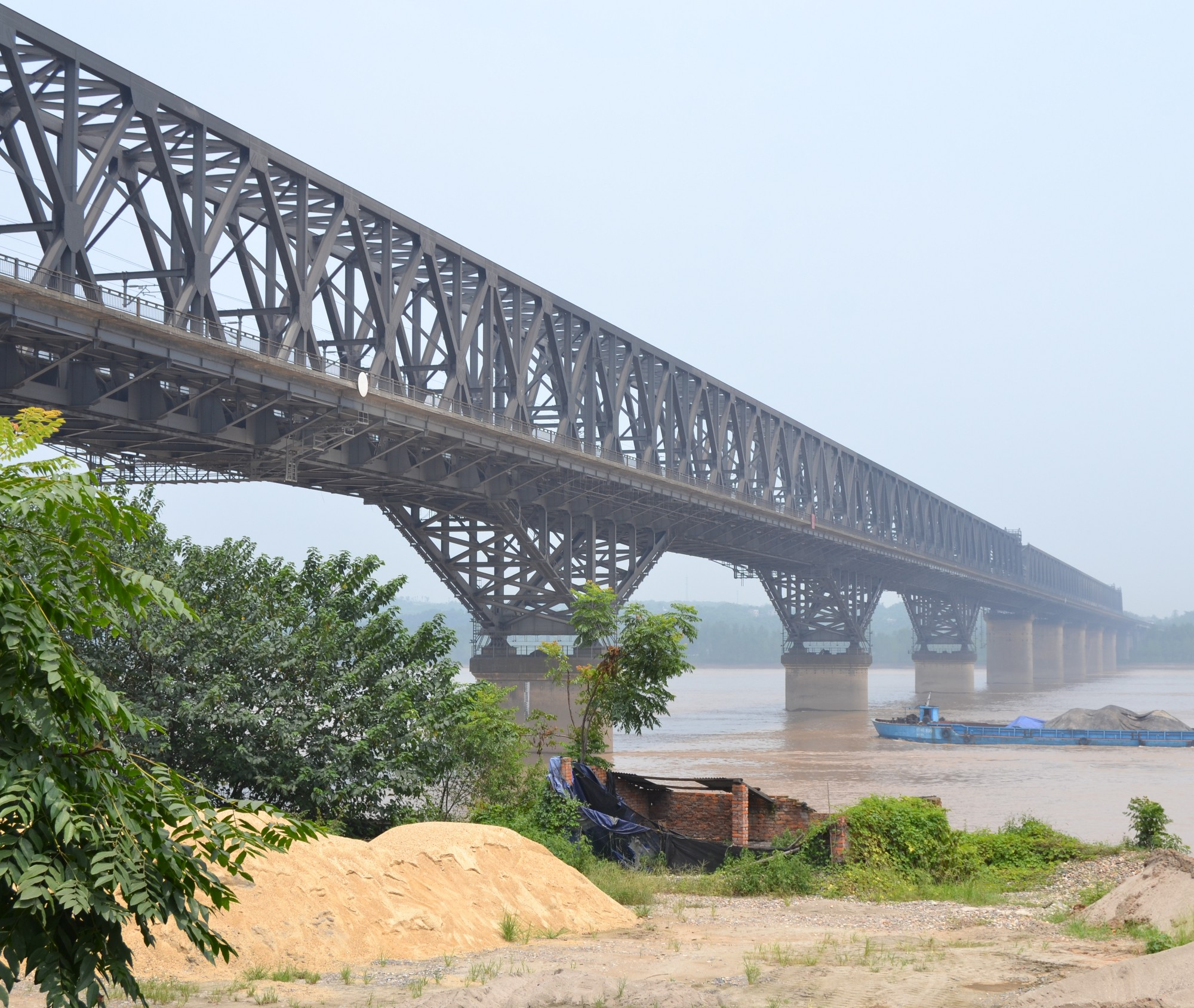
- Coordinates: 30.286086°N 111.526442°E
- Carries: Jiaoliu Railway
- Crosses: Yangtze River
- Locale: Zhicheng, Yichang, Hubei, China

Characteristics
- Design: Truss bridge
- Material: Steel
- Total length: 1,742.3 metres (5,716 ft)
- Longest span: 160 metres (520 ft)

History
- Construction start: 1965
- Construction end: 1971

Location
- Interactive map of Zhicheng Yangtze River Bridge

The Zhicheng Yangtze River Bridge is a road-rail truss bridge across the Yangtze River at Zhicheng, Hubei Province in central China. The bridge is 1,742.3 metres (5,716 ft) long and carries two tracks of the Jiaozuo–Liuzhou Railway and road traffic. The bridge, built from 1965 to 1971, was the third road-rail crossing on the lower 2,884 km (1,792 mi) of the Yangtze below Yibin.

== History ==
Planning for the Zhicheng Yangtze River bridge began in 1958. Construction began on November 26, 1965. The original plans called for only a rail bridge, but in the spring of 1970, Premier Zhou Enlai approved a proposal to add roadway lanes to either side of the rail tracks. The bridge opened on December 26, 1971, Mao Zedong's birthday. At the time, the bridge was the third road-rail bridge across the Yangtze below Yibin, after the Wuhan Yangtze River Bridge and Nanjing Yangtze River Bridge and the fourth overall, after the Baishatuo Yangtze River Railway Bridge in Chongqing.

For 15 months from 2012 to 2014, the bridge was closed for repairs.

== See also ==
- Yangtze River bridges and tunnels
