= Zhicheng =

Coordinates: 30°17′00″N 111°31′00″E

Zhicheng 枝城镇
- Town
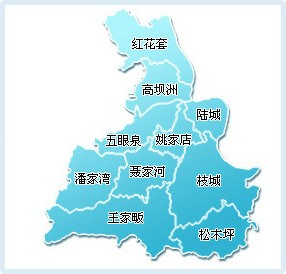
- Location in Yidu City

- Location in Hubei
- Country: People's Republic of China
- Province: Hubei
- Prefecture-level city: Yichang
- County-level city: Yidu
- Village-level divisions: 4 residential communities 28 villages

Population (2010)
  - Total: 88,935
- Time zone: UTC+8 (China Standard)

Zhicheng (Chinese: 枝城) is a town in Yidu county-level city, Yichang prefecture-level city, Hubei province, China. It is situated on the right (southern) shore of the Yangtze River, some 15 km southeast from downtown Yidu.

As of 2005, it had a population of 159,000.

Zhicheng has one Yangtze River crossing, the Zhicheng Yangtze River Bridge, which connects Zhicheng with Gujiadian Town (顾家店镇), of Zhijiang city, on the north side of the river. The bridge carries the Jiaozuo–Liuzhou Railway and a provincial highway.

== Administrative divisions ==
Four residential communities:

- Jiefanglu (解放路社区), Datong (大同社区), Yangxi (洋溪社区), Xihu (西湖社区)

Twenty-eight villages:

- Jiaguoshan (架锅山村), Lijiaping (黎家坪村), Shuijingping (水井坪村), Zhifangchong (纸坊冲村), Liulichong (六里冲村), Zhongjiachong (钟家冲村), Yangxi (洋溪村), Heyangdian (何阳店村), Huilongdang (回龙垱村), Guandang (官垱村), Guanping (官坪村), Wufengshan (五峰山村), Baishuigang (白水港村), Sanbanhu (三板湖村), Jiudaohe (九道河村), Dayan (大堰村), Yujiaqiao (余家桥村), Quanshuihe (泉水河村), Chixihe (赤溪河村), Quanxinfan (全心畈村), Yangjinfan (洋津畈村), Yanjiang (沿江村), Huancheng (环城村), Yangheling (阳和岭村), Xiejiachong (解家冲村), Louzihe (楼子河村), Liangjiafan (梁家畈村), Longwangtai (龙王台村)

== See also ==
- List of township-level divisions of Hubei
