= Yanshi railway station =

Railway station in Luoyang, Henan, China

Yanshi 偃师
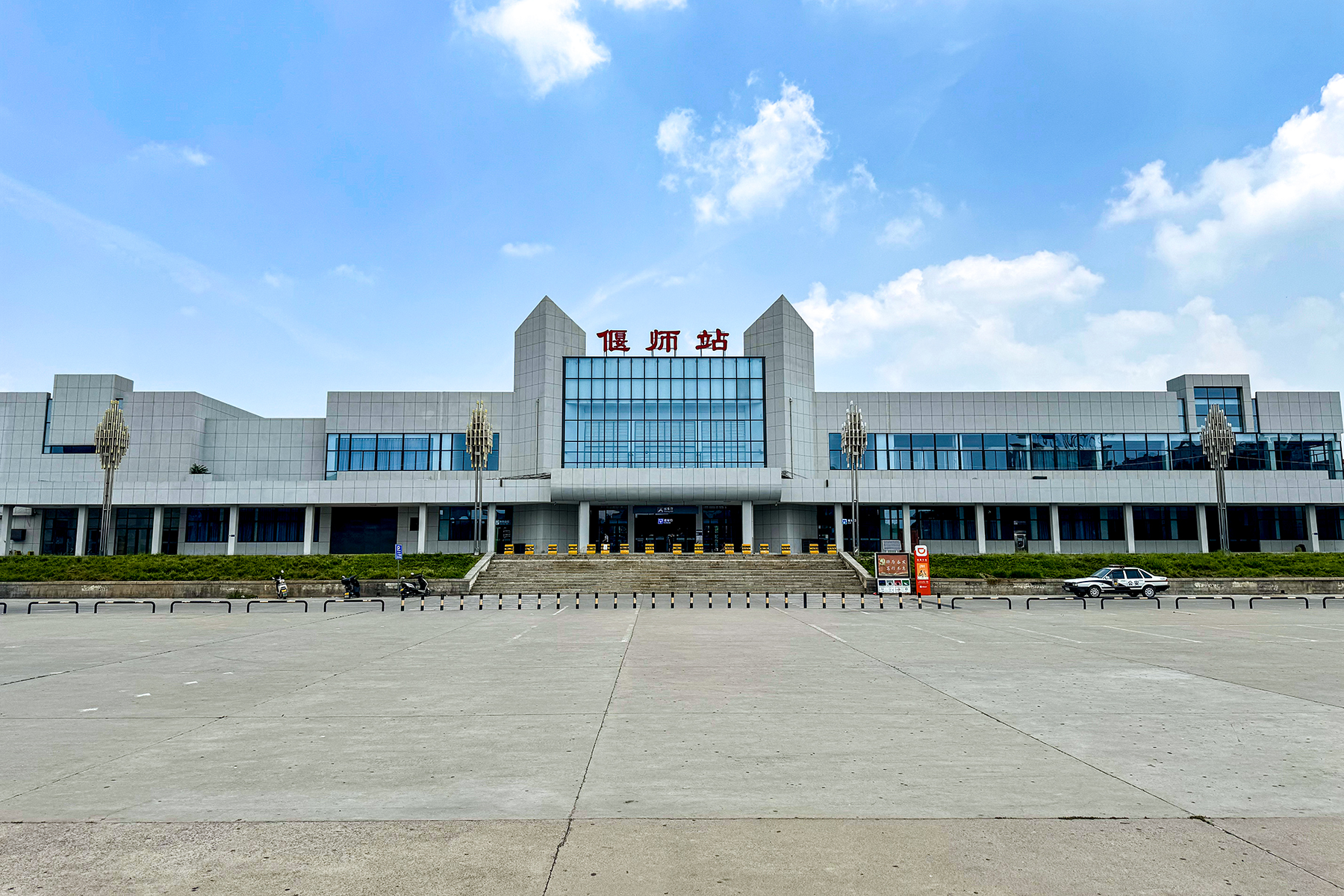
- Yanshi Railway Station

General information
- Location: 8 Chezhan Road; Yanshi District, Luoyang, Henan; China
- Coordinates: 34.7299°N 112.7884°E
- Operator: CR Zhengzhou
- Line: Longhai railway
- Platforms: 3
- Tracks: 6
- Connections: Bus terminal

Other information
- Station code: 39110 (TMIS code); YSF (telegraph code); YSH (Pinyin code)
- Classification: Class 2 station (二等站)

History
- Opened: 1908

Services
Preceding station	China Railway	Following station
Gongyi towards Lianyungang East	Longhai railway	Luoyang East towards Lanzhou
Location
- Location within Henan Location within China

Yanshi railway station (Chinese: 偃师站) is a station on Longhai railway in Yanshi District, Luoyang, Henan.

== History ==
The station was established in 1908 together with the Kaifeng-Luoyang section of Longhai railway.
