= Xiuwu West railway station =

Railway station in Jiaozuo, China

Xiuwuxi 修武西
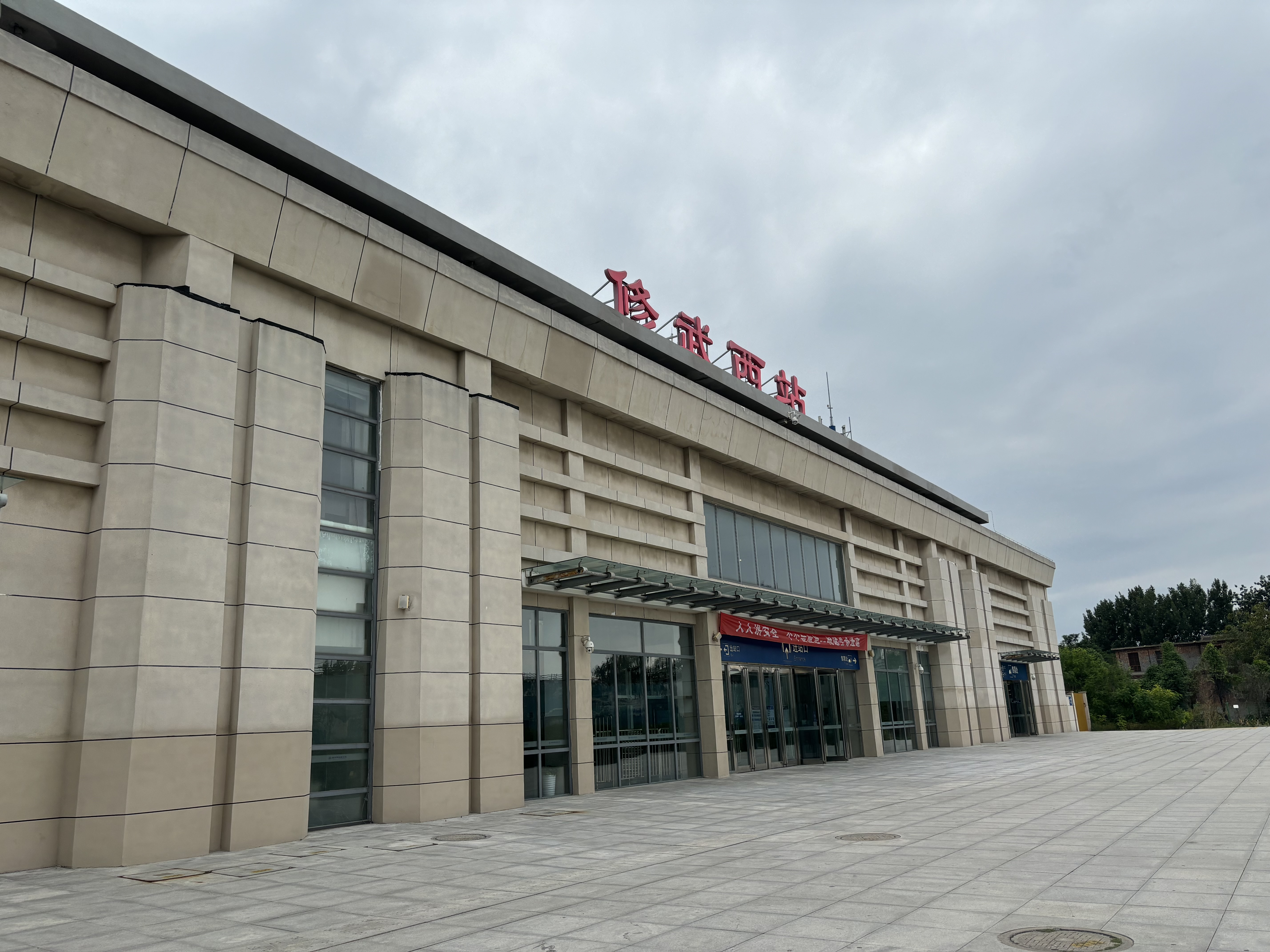

General information
- Location: Dahan Village, Chengguan Town, Xiuwu, Jiaozuo, Henan; China
- Coordinates: 35.2114°N 113.4189°E
- Operated by: CR Zhengzhou
- Line: Zhengzhou–Jiaozuo intercity railway
- Platforms: 2
- Tracks: 4

Other information
- Station code: Telegraph: EXF

History
- Opened: 2015

Services
Preceding station	China Railway High-speed	Following station
Wuzhi towards Zhengzhou	Zhengzhou–Jiaozuo intercity railway	Jiaozuo Terminus
Location

Xiuwuxi (West) railway station (Chinese: 修武西站) is a station on Zhengzhou–Jiaozuo intercity railway in Xiuwu County, Jiaozuo, Henan, China.

== Future development ==
The station is planned to be the terminus of the proposed spur line of Zhengzhou–Jiaozuo intercity railway towards Yuntaishan.
