= Dayu, Jiyuan =

Dayu 大峪镇
- Town
- Location in Henan
- Coordinates: 34°56′18″N 112°23′23″E
- Country: People's Republic of China
- Province: Henan
- Sub-prefectural city: Jiyuan
- Time zone: UTC+8 (China Standard)

Dayu (Chinese: 大峪; pinyin: Dàyù) is a town under the administration of Jiyuan, Henan, China. As of 2023, it administers the following 30 villages:

- Qiaogou Village (桥沟村)
- Luanshi Village (乱石村)
- Sanchahe Village (三岔河村)
- Yanwahe Village (砚瓦河村)
- Dougou Village (陡沟村)
- Wangzhuang Village (王庄村)
- Huaiyin Village (槐姻村)
- Xiankou Village (仙口村)
- Xuezhai Village (薛寨村)
- Liyuan Village (栗园村)
- Donggou Village (东沟村)
- Silangyao Village (寺郎腰村)
- Douyangou Village (陡岩沟村)
- Linxian Village (林仙村)
- Zengzhuang Village (曾庄村)
- Fangshan Village (方山村)
- Fantouling Village (反头岭村)
- Piankan Village (偏看村)
- Wangkeng Village (王坑村)
- Luling Village (鹿岭村)
- Zhao Village (朝村)
- Dongling Village (董岭村)
- Dakuiling Village (大奎岭村)
- Caogou Village (草沟村)
- Shangzhai Village (上寨村)
- Zhonggudui Village (冢崮堆村)
- Wangguai Village (王拐村)
- Xiaohengling Village (小横岭村)
- Tangling Village (堂岭村)
- Tongshuling Village (桐树岭村)
