= Luoyang North railway station =

Railway station in Luoyang, China

Luoyang North railway station (Chinese: 洛阳北站), formerly known as Yangwen railway station (Chinese: 杨文站), is a second-class railway station in the Chanhe Hui District, Luoyang. It now only handles freight services, not passenger services. It was built in 1970, and is a part of the Jiaozuo–Liuzhou railway.
