= Xinxiang railway station =

Railway station in Xinxiang, Henan, China

Xinxiang 新乡
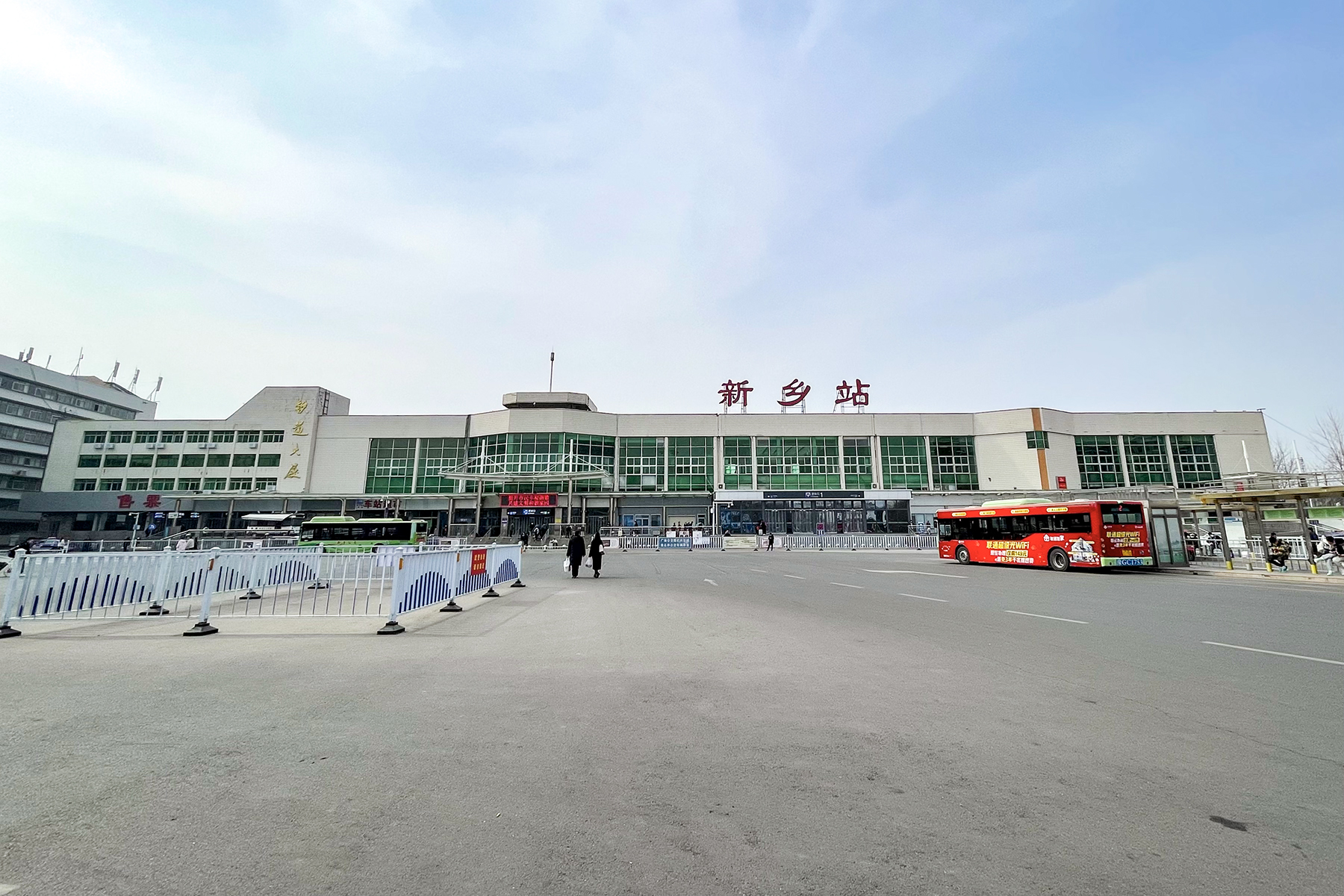

General information
- Location: 1 Pingyuan Road; Weibin District, Xinxiang, Henan; China
- Coordinates: 35.3064°N 113.8534°E
- Operator: CR Zhengzhou
- Lines: Beijing–Guangzhou railway; Xinxiang–Yueshan railway; Xinxiang–Heze–Yanzhou–Rizhao railway
- Distance: Beijing–Guangzhou railway: 588 kilometres (365 mi) from Beijing West; 1,708 kilometres (1,061 mi) from Guangzhou; Xinxiang–Yueshan railway: 79 kilometres (49 mi) from Yueshan; Xinxiang–Heze–Yanzhou–Rizhao railway: 630 kilometres (390 mi) from Rizhao
- Platforms: 9 (4 island platforms and 1 side platform)
- Tracks: 10

Other information
- Station code: 20612 (TMIS code); XXF (telegraph code); XXI (Pinyin code)
- Classification: Class 1 station (一等站)

History
- Opened: 1905
- Former names: Xinxiang County

Services
Preceding station	China Railway	Following station
Weihui towards Beijing West	Beijing–Guangzhou railway	Zhengzhou towards Guangzhou
Terminus	Xinxiang–Yueshan railway	Huojia towards Yueshan
Location
- Location within Henan Location within China

Xinxiang railway station (Chinese: 新乡站; pinyin: Xīnxiāng zhàn) is a railway station in Weibin District, Xinxiang, Henan, China. The station is on Beijing–Guangzhou railway, and serves as the eastern terminus of Xinxiang–Yueshan railway and the western terminus of Xinxiang–Yanzhou railway.

== History ==
The station was established in 1905 as Xinxiang County railway station.

== Station layout ==
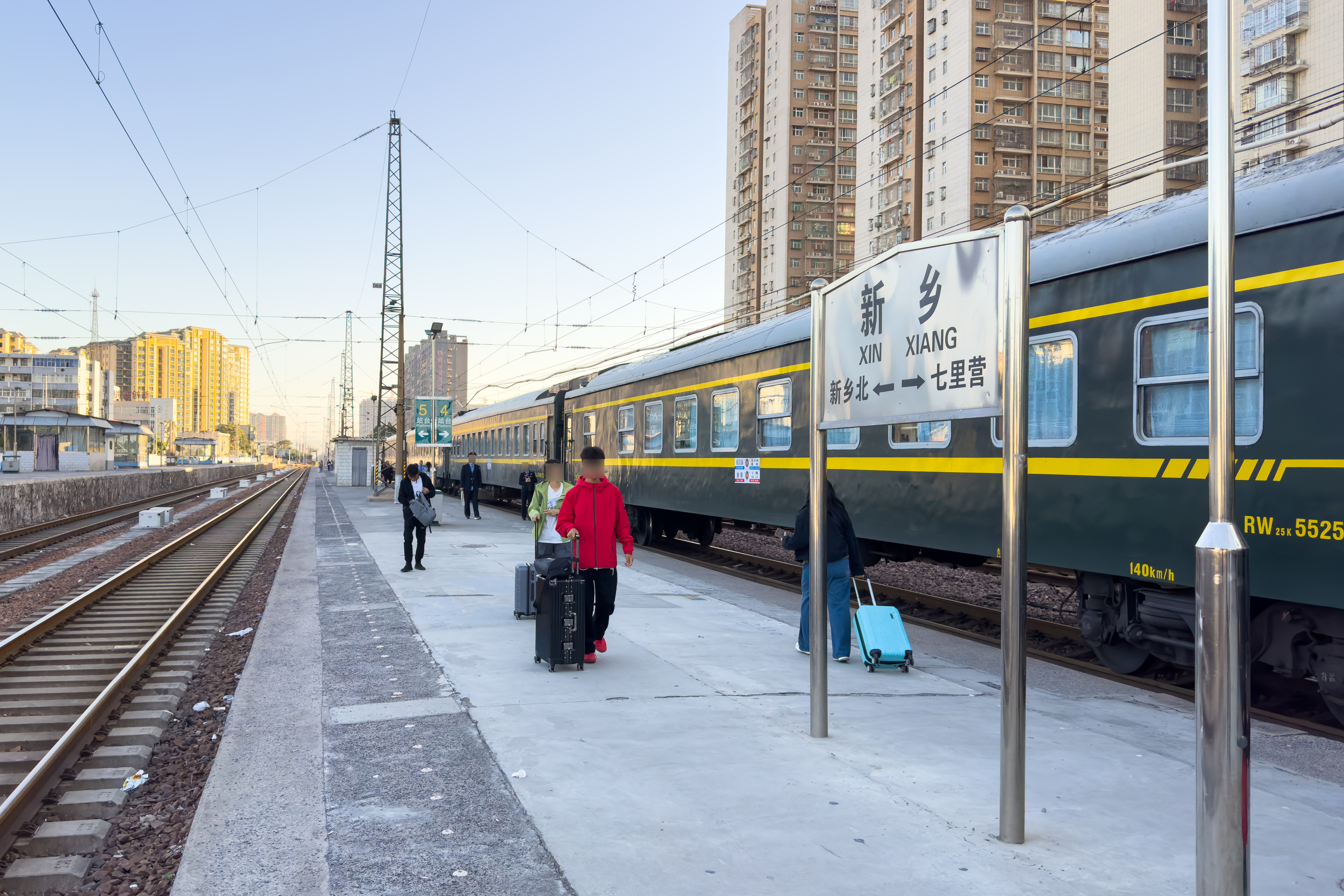
T50 Express Train in Platform 4

The station has 9 platforms (1 side platform and 4 island platforms) and 10 tracks. The station building, covering an area of 14,000 square metres (150,000 sq ft), is located to the southeast of the platforms.

== See also ==
- Xinxiang East railway station
