= Zhengzhou–Jiaozuo intercity railway =

Railway line in Henan, China

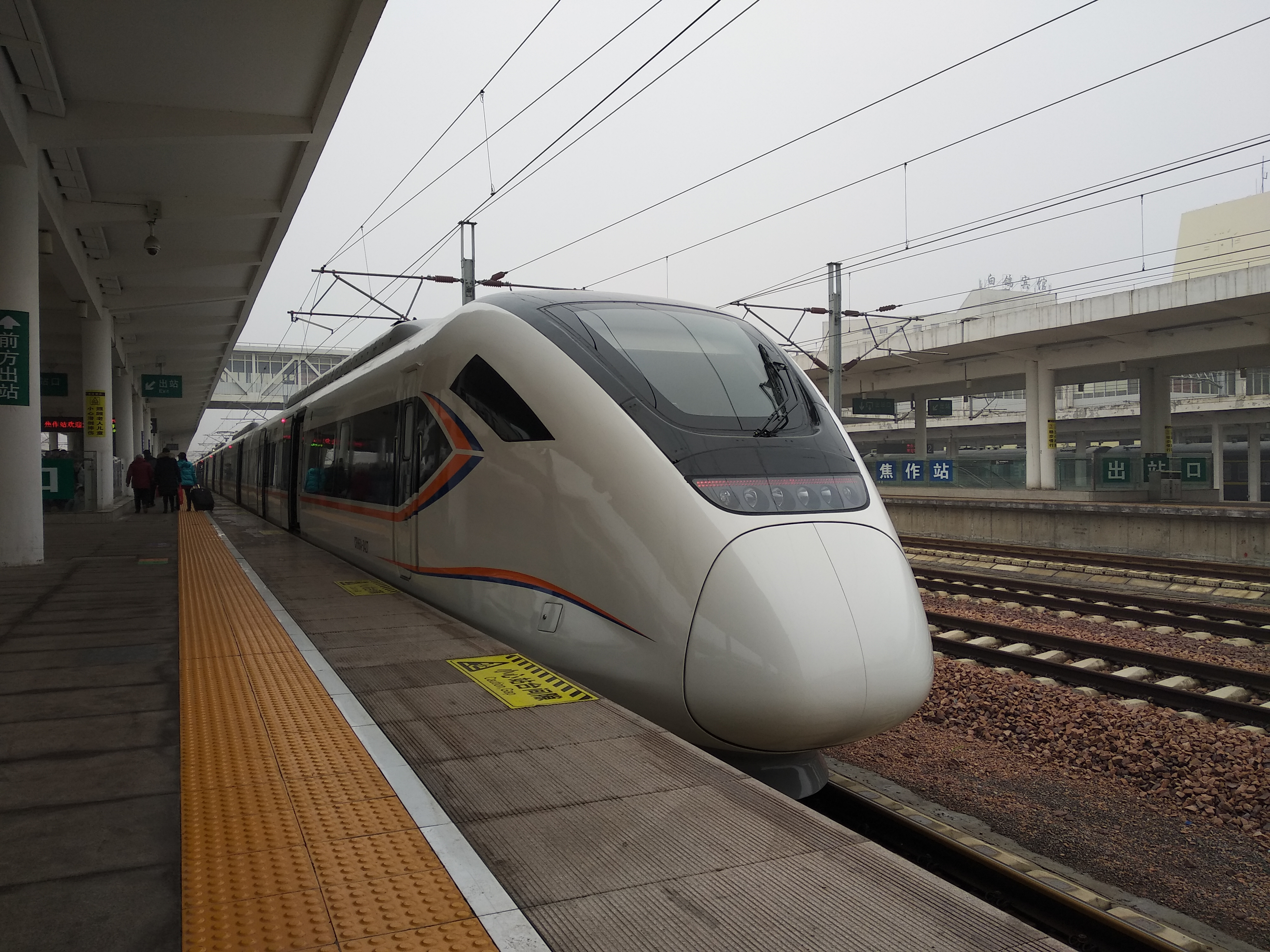

Overview
- Native name: 郑焦城际铁路 郑太客运专线郑州至焦作段
- Status: Operational
- Owner: CR Zhengzhou
- Locale: Henan province
- Termini: Zhengzhou; Jiaozuo
- Stations: 7

Service
- Type: Higher-speed rail
- System: Central Plains MIR
- Operator(s): China Railway High-speed
- Rolling stock: CRH6A

History
- Opened: June 26, 2015

Technical
- Line length: 77.786 km (48 mi)
- Track gauge: 1,435 mm (4 ft 8 1/2 in) standard gauge
- Electrification: 25 kV 50 Hz AC (Overhead line)
- Operating speed: 200 km/h (124 mph)

Zhengzhou-Jiaozuo intercity railway
- Simplified Chinese: 郑焦城际铁路
- Traditional Chinese: 鄭焦城際鐵路
Transcriptions
Standard Mandarin
- Hanyu Pinyin: Zhèng Jiāo Chéng Jì Tiělù

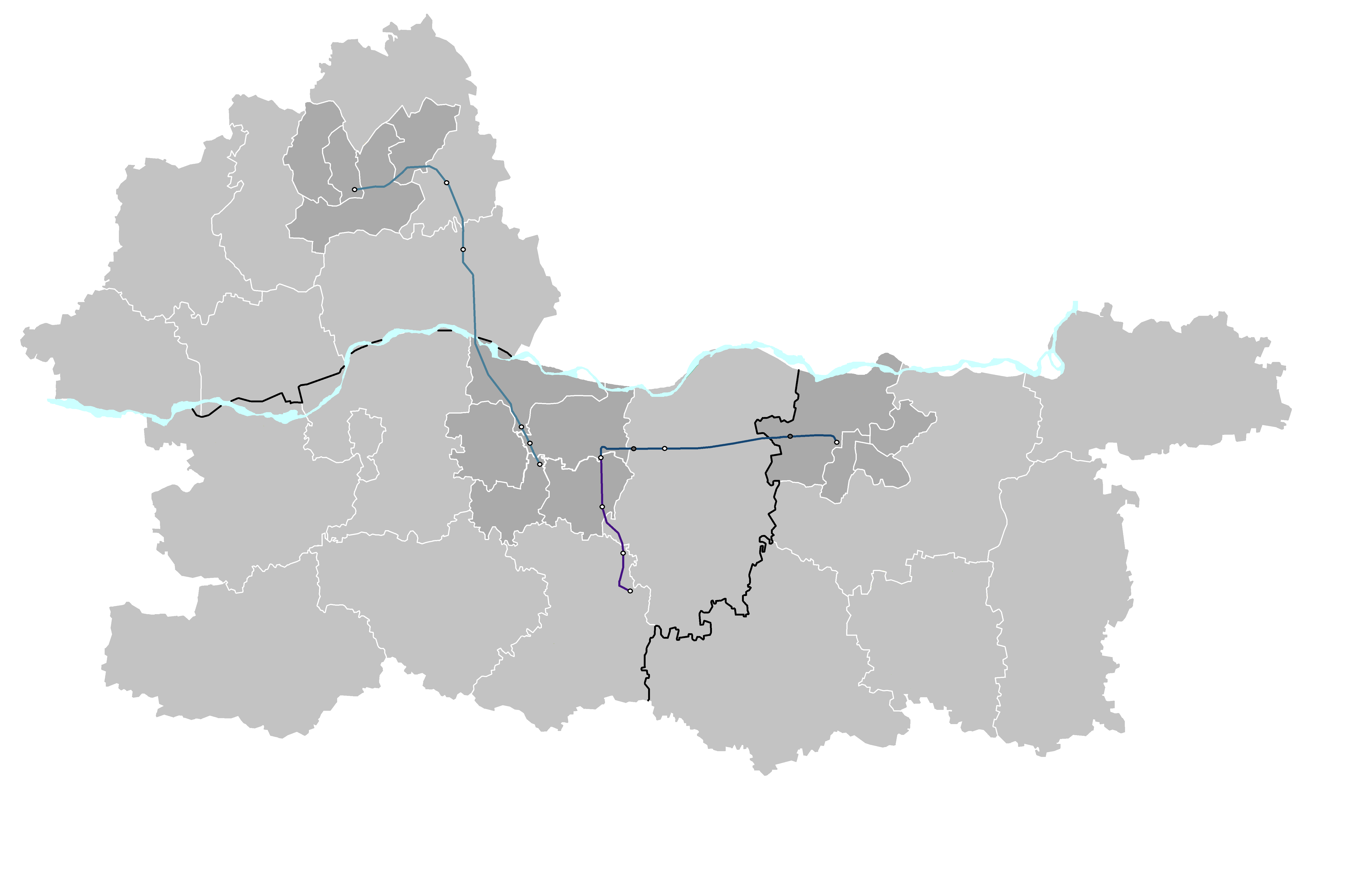
Zhengzhou–Jiaozuo intercity railway is indicated by the light blue line

Zhengzhou–Jiaozuo intercity railway, or Zhengjiao intercity railway, is regional higher-speed railway radiating out of Zhengzhou, the capital of Henan province, linking Zhengzhou with the city of Jiaozuo. Construction was started on December 29, 2009, and was completed by April 5, 2015. Testing commenced in May 2015 before being officially opened on June 26, 2015. Total journey time between the two termini is 40 minutes. It is 77.786 km (48 mi) long, of which 9.648 km (6 mi) is shared with the Beijing–Guangzhou railway and 68.138 km (42 mi) of new trackage. It was jointly funded by the Henan Provincial Government and the now defunct Ministry of Railways. The fastest trains from Zhengzhou to Jiaozuo complete the journey in 34 minutes.

At its northern terminus, Jiaozuo, some trains continue into the Taiyuan–Jiaozuo high-speed railway which opened in December 2020. Some regional trains from Jiaozuo through operate to Zhengzhou Xinzheng Airport via the Zhengji ICR or to Kaifeng via the Zhengkai ICR.

== Stations ==
| Station code | Station name | | Connections | Location | City |
| Station code | English | Chinese | Connections | Location | City |
|---|---|---|---|---|---|
| ZZF | Zhengzhou | 郑州 | 1 10 | Erqi | Zhengzhou |
| HTF | Haitangsi | ~~海棠寺~~ | | Jinshui | Zhengzhou |
| NYF | Nanyangzhai | 南阳寨 | | Huiji | Zhengzhou |
| HCF | Huanghejingqu | 黄河景区 | | Huiji | Zhengzhou |
| WIF | Wuzhi | 武陟 | | Wuzhi | Jiaozuo |
| EXF | Xiuwu West | 修武西 | | Xiuwu | Jiaozuo |
| JOF | Jiaozuo | 焦作 | | Jiefang | Jiaozuo |
