= Jiyuan =

Jiyuan 济源市 Tsiyuan
- County-level & Sub-prefectural city
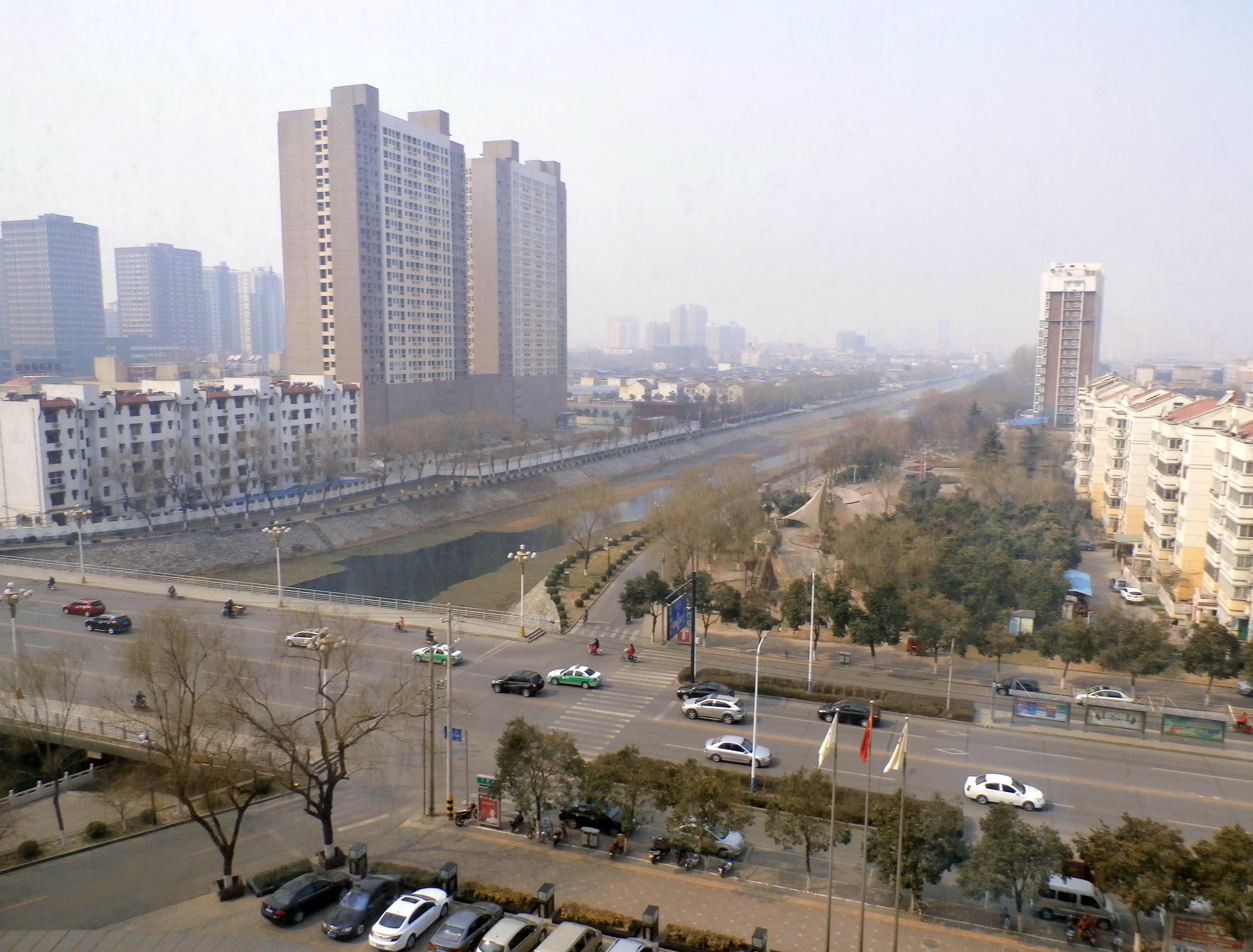

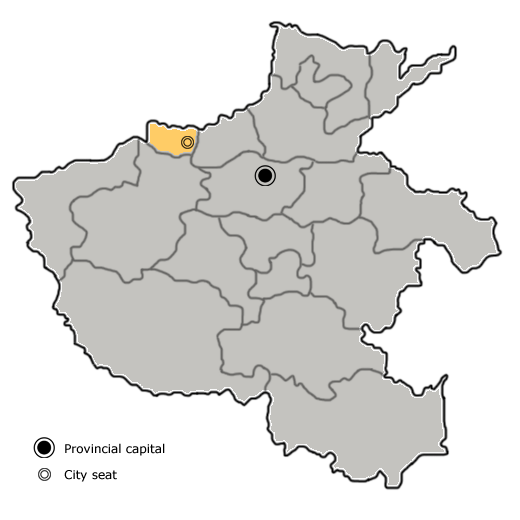
- Location of Jiyuan City jurisdiction in Henan

- Location in China
- Coordinates: 35°04′01″N 112°36′07″E
- Country: People's Republic of China
- Province: Henan

Area
  - Total: 1,965 km^{2} (759 sq mi)

Population (2019)
  - Total: 733,700
  - Density: 373.4/km^{2} (967.1/sq mi)

GDP
  - Total: CN¥ 53.9 billion US$ 8.1 billion
  - Per capita: CN¥ 72,722; US$ 11,099
- Time zone: UTC+8 (China Standard)
- Postal Code: 454650
- Area code: 0391
- Major Nationalities: Han
- Township-level divisions: 16
- License plate prefixes: 豫U
- Website: jiyuan.gov.cn

Jiyuan (simplified Chinese: 济源; traditional Chinese: 濟源; pinyin: Jìyuán) is a sub-prefecture-level city in northwestern Henan province, People's Republic of China. It borders the prefecture-level cities of Jiaozuo and Luoyang to the east and southwest respectively, as well as the province of Shanxi to the north.

== Administration ==
The sub-prefecture-level city of Jiyuan administers 5 subdistricts and 11 towns. Jiyuan is named after the Ji river whose source is said to be a spring located on the west of the city.

Subdistricts

- Beihai Subdistrict (北海街道)
- Jishui Subdistrict (济水街道)
- Qinyuan Subdistrict (沁园街道)
- Tiantan Subdistrict (天坛街道)
- Yuquan Subdistrict (玉泉街道)

Towns

- Chengliu (承留镇)
- Dayu (大峪镇)
- Kejing (克井镇)
- Lilin (梨林镇)
- Potou (坡头镇)
- Shaoyuan (邵原镇)
- Sili (思礼镇)
- Wangwu (王屋镇)
- Wulongkou (五龙口镇)
- Xiaye (下冶镇)
- Zhicheng (轵城镇)

== Mythology ==
- The famous Chinese mythology fable "The Foolish Old Man Removes the Mountains" may have come from this area. Mountains mentioned in this myth are Taihang and Wangwu.

== History ==
Jiyuan was a county belonging to Jiaozuo City in the past, then it was divided from the city. The former Ji River—one of the ancient "Four Rivers", alongside the Yangtze, Huai, and Yellow Rivers—originated around Jiyuan, which was the source of its name, Chinese for "Source of the Ji". (Today, the Ji has been entirely subsumed by the Yellow River, which shifted to the bed of the Ji during its massive 1852 flood.) According to the latest archaeological findings, as early as around 10,000 years ago, precisely at the end of the Paleolithic Period and the beginning of the Neolithic Period, people have lived here. It used to be the capital of the Xia Dynasty and was well known for its wealth between the Period of Warring States and Han Dynasty.

In the Shang dynasty it was a Fang state - Ya (亞方).

== Agriculture ==
There are many crops grown in Jiyuan, such as wheat, peanut, cotton, sweet potato, maize and other crops.

== Climate ==
Climate data for Jiyuan, elevation 140 m (460 ft), (1991–2020 normals, extremes 1981–2010)
Month	Jan	Feb	Mar	Apr	May	Jun	Jul	Aug	Sep	Oct	Nov	Dec	Year
Record high °C (°F)	20.5 (68.9)	23.9 (75.0)	29.5 (85.1)	36.4 (97.5)	40.5 (104.9)	42.6 (108.7)	41.6 (106.9)	39.3 (102.7)	38.8 (101.8)	35.1 (95.2)	27.7 (81.9)	24.2 (75.6)	42.6 (108.7)
Mean daily maximum °C (°F)	6.6 (43.9)	10.3 (50.5)	16.0 (60.8)	22.5 (72.5)	27.8 (82.0)	32.8 (91.0)	32.5 (90.5)	30.7 (87.3)	27.2 (81.0)	22.0 (71.6)	14.8 (58.6)	8.7 (47.7)	21.0 (69.8)
Daily mean °C (°F)	0.6 (33.1)	4.0 (39.2)	9.5 (49.1)	15.9 (60.6)	21.5 (70.7)	26.4 (79.5)	27.6 (81.7)	26.0 (78.8)	21.4 (70.5)	15.8 (60.4)	8.5 (47.3)	2.5 (36.5)	15.0 (59.0)
Mean daily minimum °C (°F)	−4.0 (24.8)	−1.2 (29.8)	3.7 (38.7)	9.4 (48.9)	14.8 (58.6)	20.1 (68.2)	23.2 (73.8)	21.9 (71.4)	16.5 (61.7)	10.7 (51.3)	3.6 (38.5)	−2.2 (28.0)	9.7 (49.5)
Record low °C (°F)	−18.5 (−1.3)	−17.3 (0.9)	−8.1 (17.4)	−1.8 (28.8)	2.3 (36.1)	10.7 (51.3)	16.3 (61.3)	12.8 (55.0)	6.2 (43.2)	−1.3 (29.7)	−9.7 (14.5)	−11.1 (12.0)	−18.5 (−1.3)
Average precipitation mm (inches)	9.3 (0.37)	12.3 (0.48)	19.1 (0.75)	32.2 (1.27)	52.0 (2.05)	68.9 (2.71)	141.8 (5.58)	105.5 (4.15)	77.0 (3.03)	39.2 (1.54)	24.9 (0.98)	5.7 (0.22)	587.9 (23.13)
Average precipitation days (≥ 0.1 mm)	3.3	3.8	4.8	5.8	7.4	7.6	11.3	10.5	8.7	6.7	5.1	2.9	77.9
Average snowy days	3.8	3.2	1.2	0.1	0	0	0	0	0	0	0.9	2.4	11.6
Average relative humidity (%)	60	59	59	63	62	60	75	80	76	69	66	59	66
Mean monthly sunshine hours	114.4	127.6	160.1	189.5	212.2	191.7	161.4	163.7	145.2	144.3	134.1	132.7	1,876.9
Percentage possible sunshine	36	41	43	48	49	44	37	40	40	42	44	44	42
Source: China Meteorological Administration

== Transportation ==
- Houma–Yueshan Railway
- Jiaozuo–Liuzhou Railway
