= Jiaozuo–Liuzhou railway =

Railway line in China

Jiaozuo–Liuzhou railway 焦柳铁路

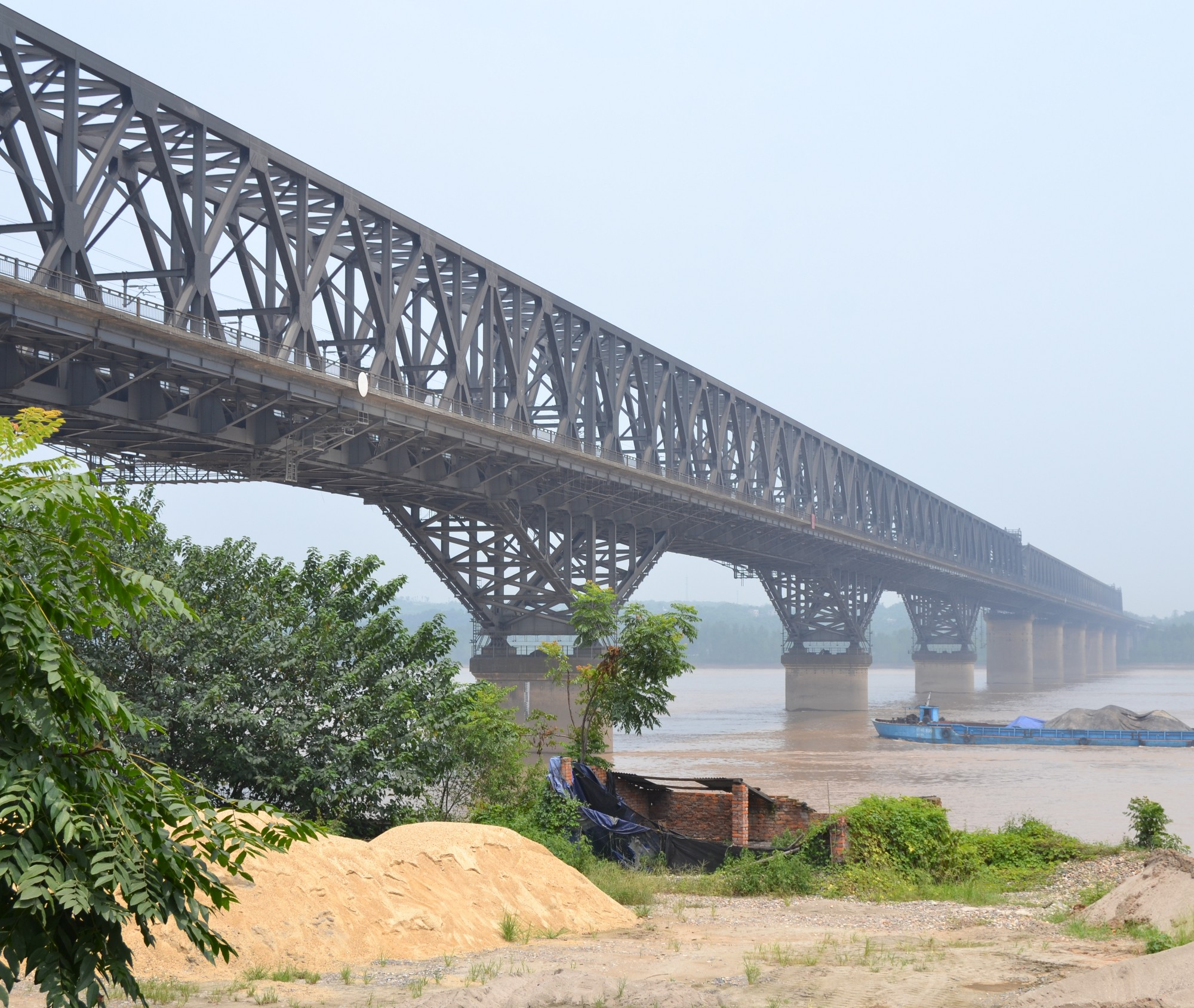
- The Jiaoliu railway crosses the Yangtze River via the Zhicheng Yangtze River Bridge in Zhicheng, Hubei Province.

Overview
- Status: Active
- Termini: Jiaozuo; Liuzhou

Service
- Type: Heavy rail
- Operator: China Railway

Technical
- Line length: 1,639 km (1,018 mi)
- Number of tracks: 2 (Yueshan–Shimenxian North); 1 (Shimenxian North–Liuzhou)
- Track gauge: 1,435 mm (4 ft 8 1/2 in) standard gauge
- Electrification: 25 kV/50 Hz AC overhead catenary
- Operating speed: 120 km/h (75 mph)

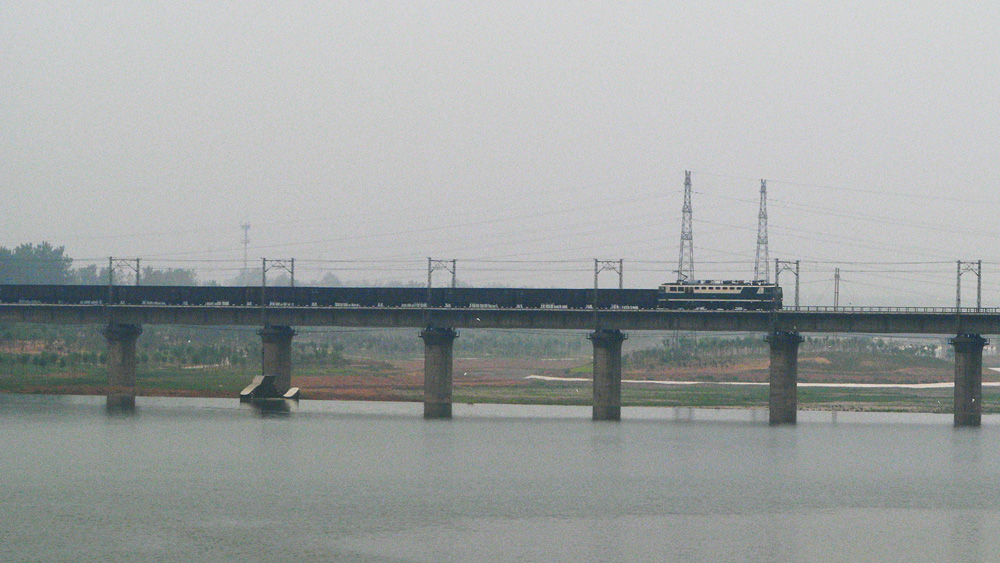
A freight train crossing the Yi River Bridge on the Jiaoliu railway near Longmen in Luoyang.

The Jiaozuo–Liuzhou railway or Jiaoliu railway (simplified Chinese: 焦柳铁路; traditional Chinese: 焦柳鐵路; pinyin: jiāoliǔ tiělù) is a major trunkline railroad in China between Jiaozuo in central China and Liuzhou in southern China. The line is 1,639 km (1,018 mi) long and runs north–south through four provinces. The line was built between 1969 and 1978.

Major cities along route include Jiaozuo, Jiyuan, Luoyang, Nanyang and Dengzhou in Henan Province; Xiangyang and Jingmen in Hubei Province; Shimen, Zhangjiajie, Jishou and Huaihua in Hunan Province and Liuzhou in the Guangxi Autonomous Region.

== History ==
The Jiaoliu railway was built in northern and southern sections. The northern section from Jiaozuo to Zhicheng Town (in Yidu County-level City, Hubei Province) was built from 1969 to 1970. The southern section from Zhicheng to Liuzhou was built from 1970 to 1978. The two halves were joined in 1988 after the completion of the Zhicheng Yangtze River Bridge. In December 2009, electrification of the Luoyang-Zhangjiangjie section was completed and top train speeds rose from 100 km/h (62 mph) to 160 km/h (99 mph).

Electrification of the final section, from Huaihua to Liuzhou, was completed in December 2020.

The Luoyang–Shimen section of the Jiaoliu is part of the Luoyang–Zhanjiang railway.

== Railway Junctions ==
The Jiaoliu railway traverses more than a dozen major railways including:

Henan Province

- Jiaozuo (Yueshan station): Taiyuan–Jiaozuo railway, Xinxiang–Yueshan railway
- Jiyuan (Liandong station): Houma–Yueshan railway
- Luoyang: Longhai railway
- Nanyang: Nanjing–Xi'an railway

Hubei Province

- Xiangyang: Xiangyang–Chongqing railway, Hanyang–Danjiangkou railway
- Jingmen: Jingmen–Shashi railway

Hunan Province

- Shimen: Luoyang–Zhanjiang railway, Shimen–Changsha railway
- Huaihua: Shanghai–Kunming railway, Chongqing–Huaihua railway

Guangxi Zhuang Autonomous Region

- Liuzhou: Hunan–Guangxi railway, Guizhou–Guangxi railway

== See also ==
- List of railways in China
