= Jiaozuo railway station =

Railway station in Jiaozuo, China

Jiaozuo railway station 焦作站
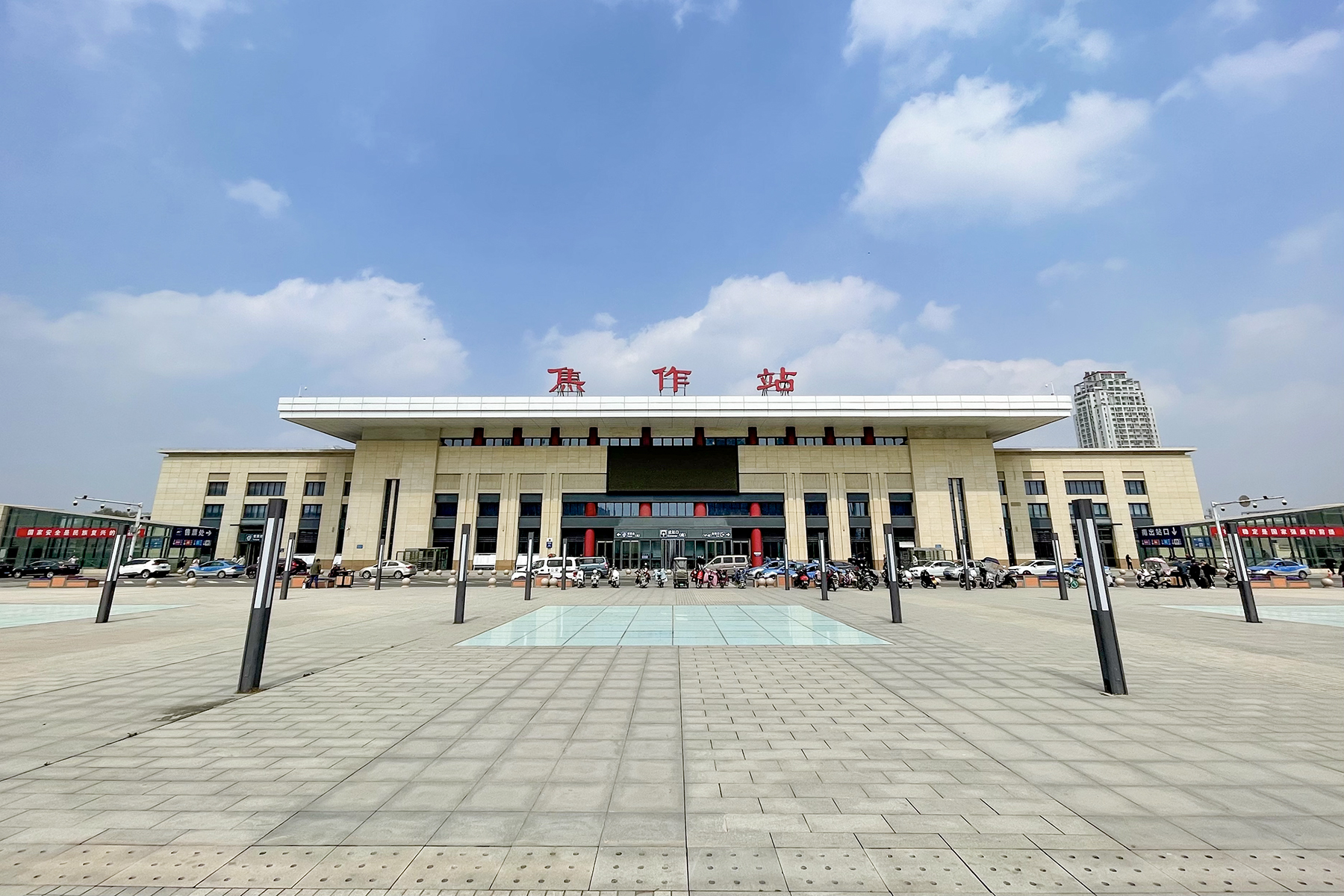
- South station building

General information
- Location: 129 Zhanqian Road; Jiefang District, Jiaozuo, Henan; China
- Coordinates: 35.2231°N 113.2287°E
- Operator: CR Zhengzhou
- Lines: Xinxiang–Yueshan railway; Jiaozuo–Liuzhou railway; Zhengzhou–Jiaozuo intercity railway; Taiyuan–Jiaozuo high-speed railway
- Platforms: 8
- Tracks: 11
- Connections: Bus

Other information
- Station code: 38402 (TMIS code); JOF (telegraph code); JZU (Pinyin code)
- Classification: Second Class station

History
- Opened: 1965; 61 years ago

Services
Preceding station	China Railway	Following station
Huojia towards Xinxiang	Xinxiang–Yueshan railway	Yueshan Terminus
Terminus	Jiaozuo–Liuzhou railway	Yueshan towards Liuzhou
Preceding station	China Railway High-speed	Following station
Xiuwu West towards Zhengzhou	Zhengzhou–Jiaozuo intercity railway	Terminus
Jiaozuo West towards Taiyuan South	Taiyuan–Jiaozuo high-speed railway	Terminus
Location

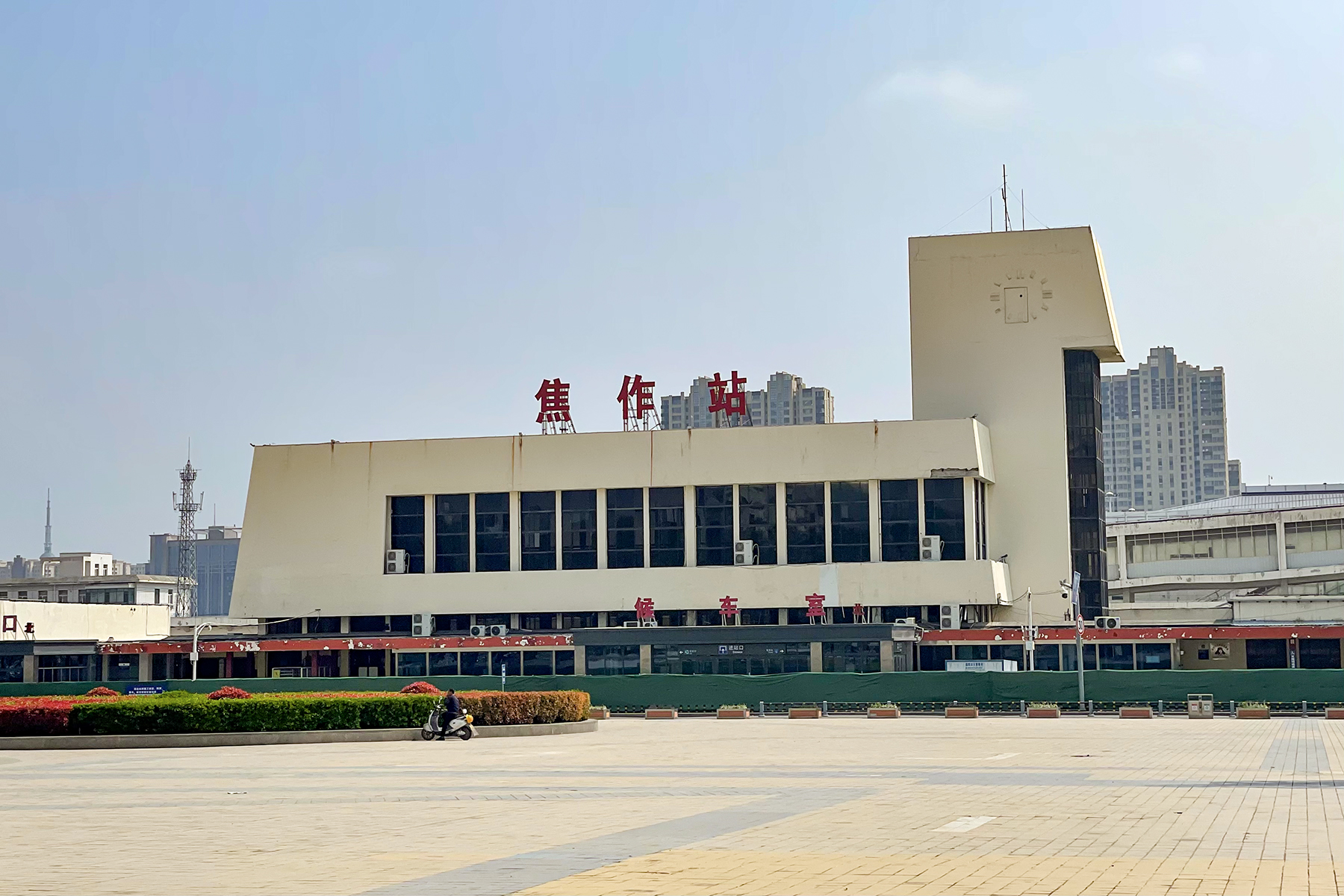
Northern facade

Jiaozuo railway station (Chinese: 焦作站) is a station on the Xinxiang–Yueshan railway and the Zhengzhou–Jiaozuo intercity railway in Jiaozuo, Henan.

== History ==
The station was established in 1965. The current north station building, covering an area of 4,019 square metres (43,260 sq ft), was renovated in 1988.

In 2015, the station was connected with the Zhengzhou–Jiaozuo intercity railway. As an auxiliary project, the south station building and south plaza commenced construction in 2016, and was put into use on 1 July 2018.

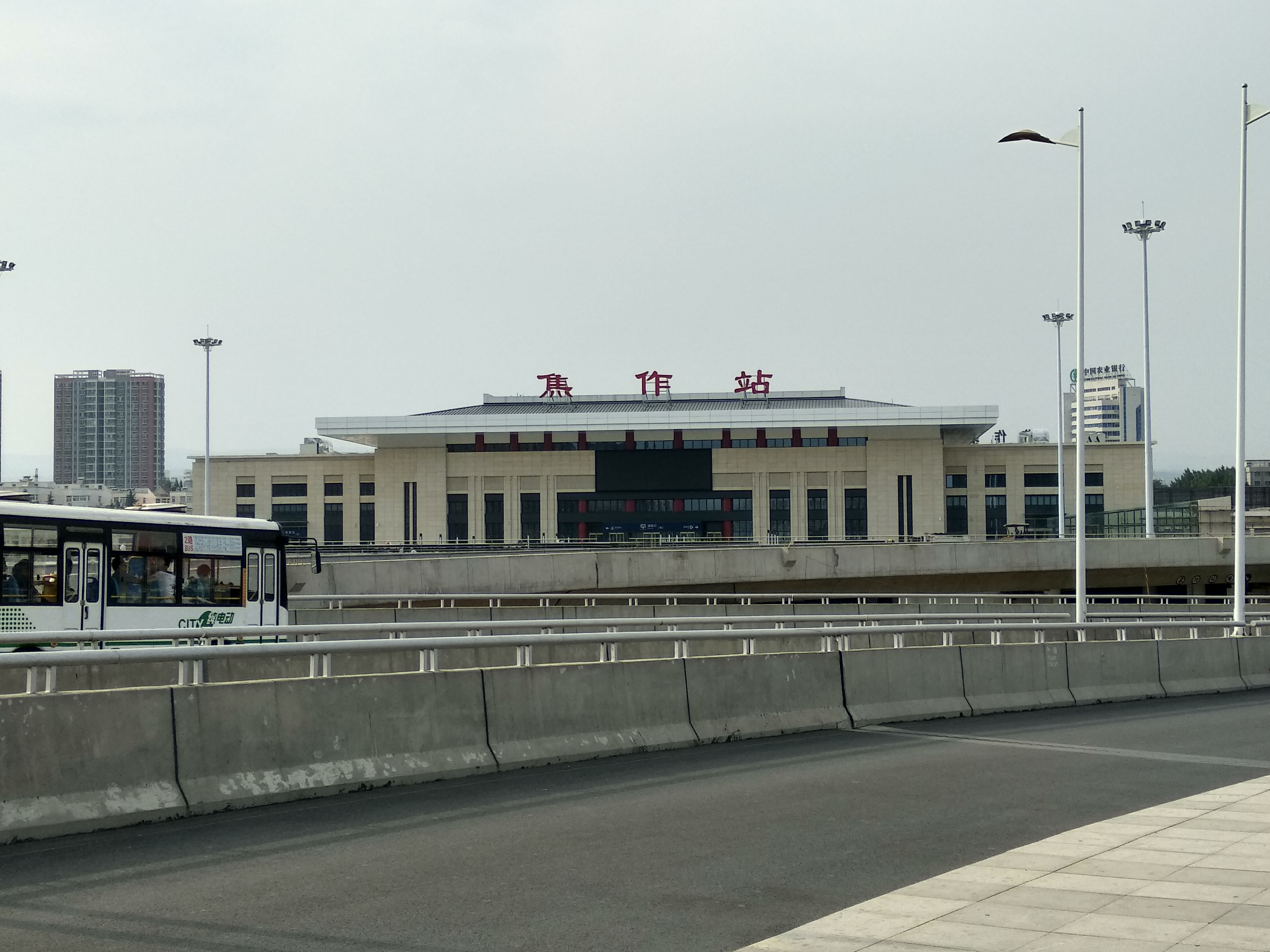
South station building

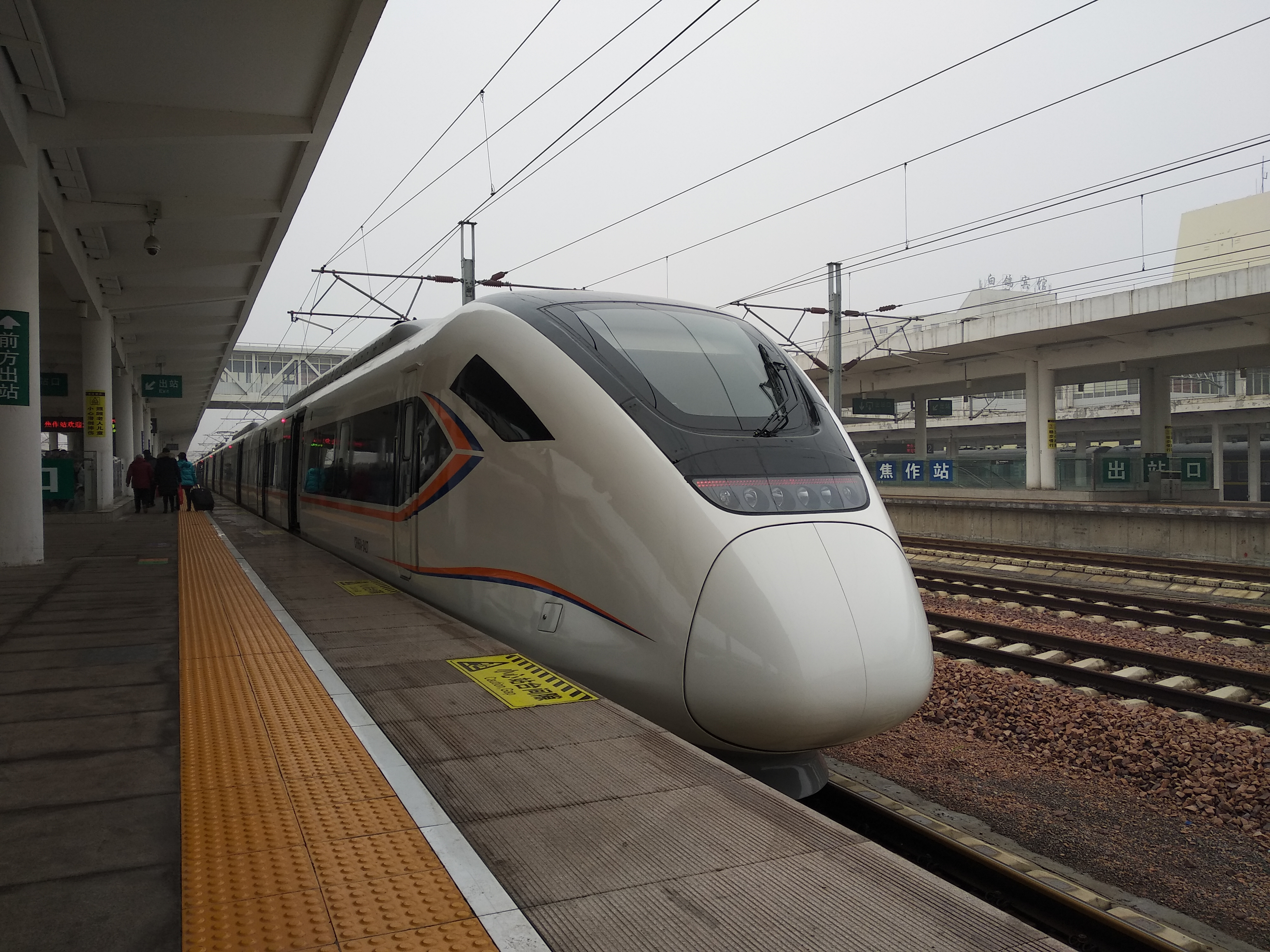
CRH6A trains operating on the Zhengzhou-Jiaozuo intercity railway at the station

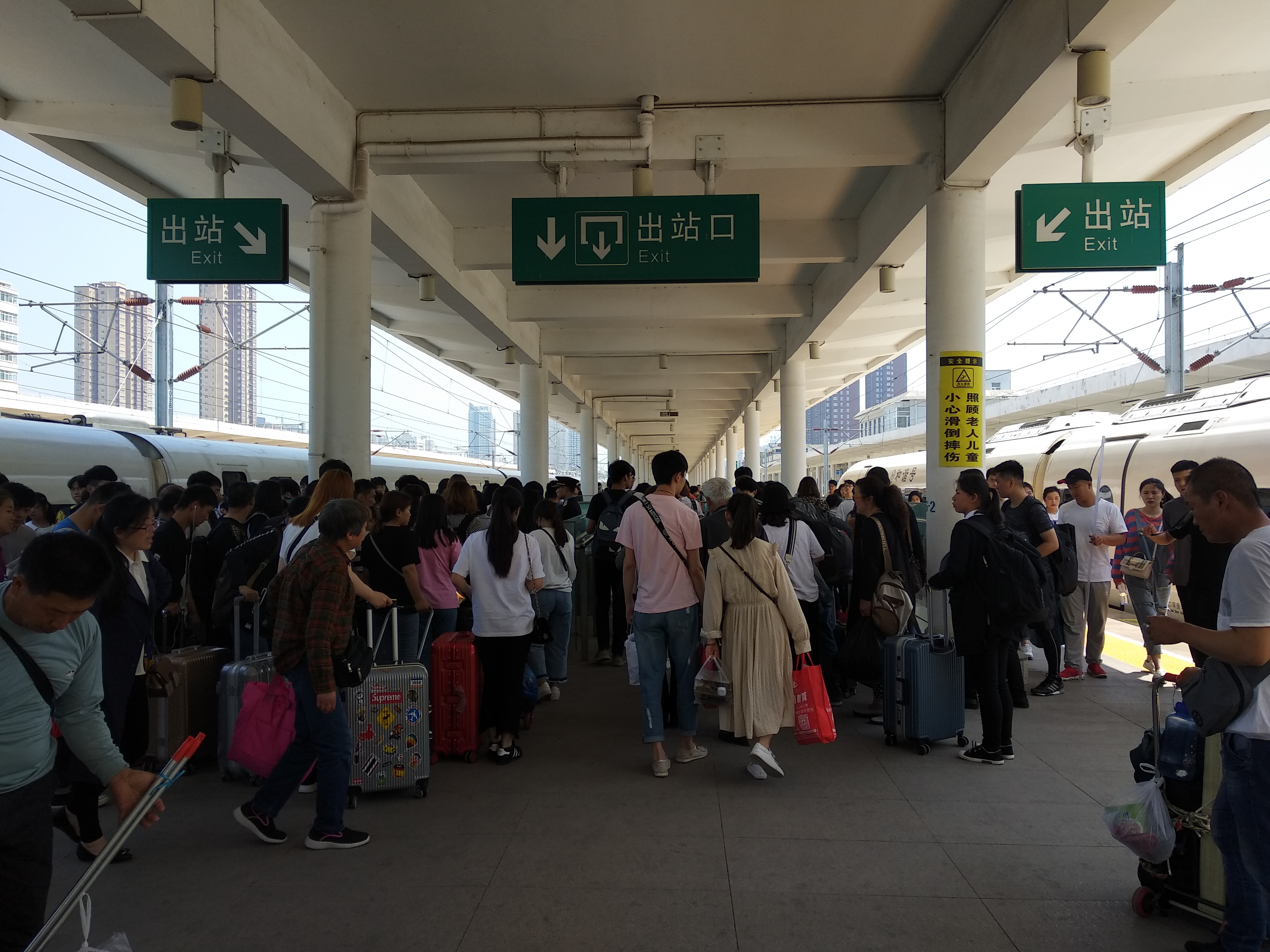
Platform 6 and 7

== Station Layout ==
1F	North station building	Ticket offices, Waiting rooms
1F	Side platform
1F	Platform 1	Xinxiang–Yueshan railway towards Yueshan (Terminus)
1F	Platform 2	Xinxiang–Yueshan railway towards Yueshan (Terminus)
1F	Island platform
1F	Platform 3	Xinxiang–Yueshan railway towards Xinxiang (Huojia)
1F	Through track	Xinxiang–Yueshan railway towards Xinxiang (Huojia)
1F	Platform 4	Xinxiang–Yueshan railway towards Xinxiang (Huojia)
1F	Island platform
1F	Platform 5	Zhengzhou–Jiaozuo intercity railway towards Zhengzhou (Xiuwu West)
1F	Through track	Zhengzhou–Jiaozuo intercity railway
1F	Through track	Zhengzhou–Jiaozuo intercity railway Reserved
1F	Platform 6	Zhengzhou–Jiaozuo intercity railway towards Zhengzhou (Xiuwu West)
1F	Island platform
1F	Platform 7	Zhengzhou–Jiaozuo intercity railway towards Zhengzhou (Xiuwu West)
1F	Platform 8	Zhengzhou–Jiaozuo intercity railway towards Zhengzhou (Xiuwu West)
1F	Side platform
1F	South station building	Ticket offices, Waiting rooms
