= Bo'ai County =

Bo'ai County 博爱县 Poai
- County
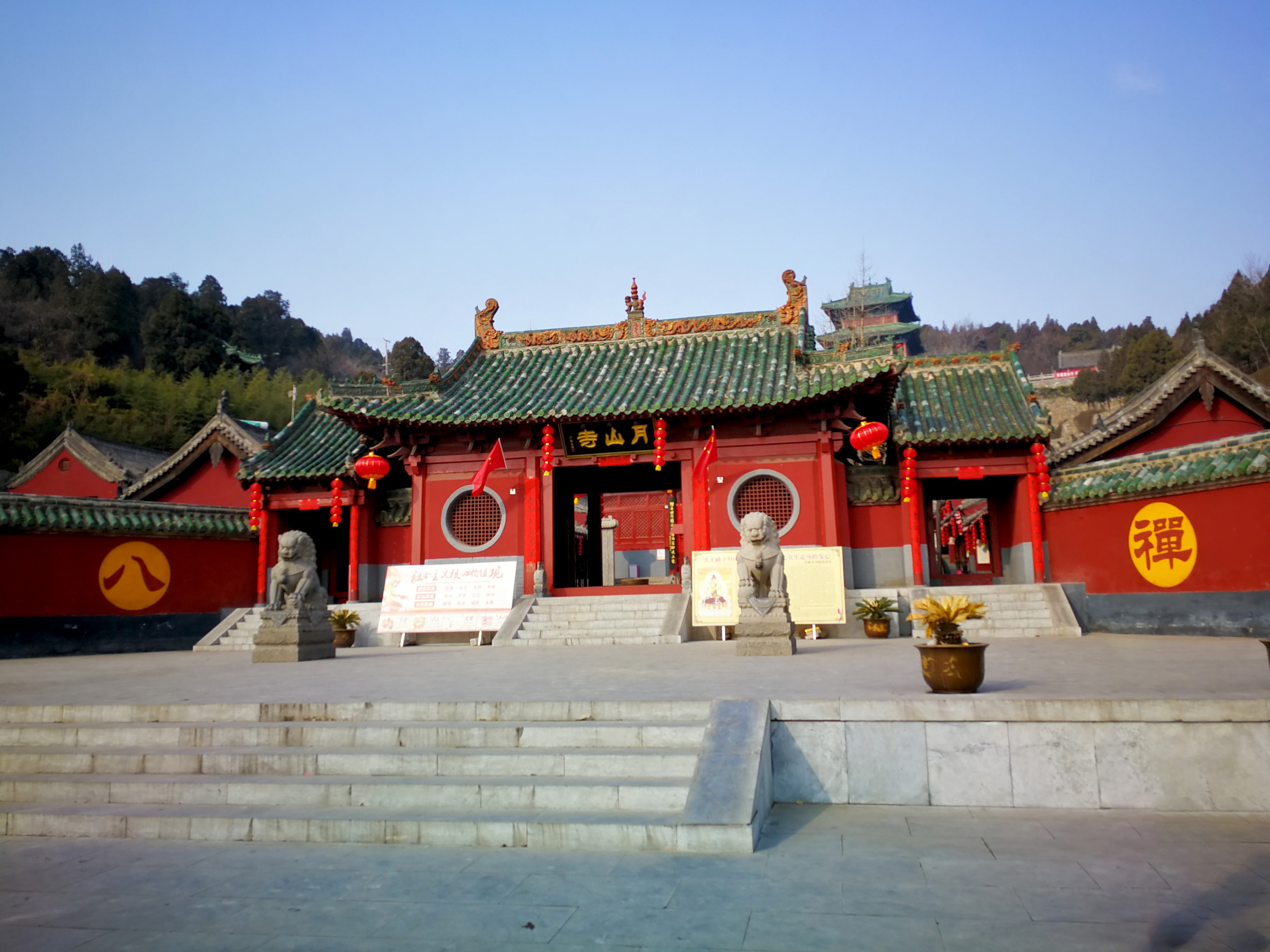

- Location of the seat in Henan
- Coordinates: 35°10′30″N 113°04′00″E
- Country: People's Republic of China
- Province: Henan
- Prefecture-level city: Jiaozuo

Area
  - Total: 492 km^{2} (190 sq mi)

Population (2019)
  - Total: 380,100
  - Density: 773/km^{2} (2,000/sq mi)
- Time zone: UTC+8 (China Standard)
- Postal code: 454450

Bo'ai County (simplified Chinese: 博爱县; traditional Chinese: 博愛縣; pinyin: Bó'ài Xiàn) is a county in northern Henan, China. It is under the administration of the Jiaozuo prefecture-level city.

== History ==
Bo'ai County was established in 1927. Its name derives from the Chinese translation of "fraternity" in "Liberté, égalité, fraternité", while the term "Bo'ai" literally means "Universal Love".

== Administrative divisions ==
As of 2012, this county is divided to 7 towns and 3 townships.

Towns

- Baishan (柏山镇)
- Motou (磨头镇)
- Qinghua (清化镇)
- Xiaojing (孝敬镇)
- Xuliang (许良镇)
- Yangmiao (阳庙镇)
- Yueshan (月山镇)

Townships

- Jincheng Township (金城乡)
- Sujiazuo Township (苏家作乡)
- Zhaihuo Township (寨豁乡)

== Climate ==
Climate data for Bo'ai, elevation 120 m (390 ft), (1991–2020 normals, extremes 1981–2010)
Month	Jan	Feb	Mar	Apr	May	Jun	Jul	Aug	Sep	Oct	Nov	Dec	Year
Record high °C (°F)	19.1 (66.4)	23.6 (74.5)	29.5 (85.1)	36.9 (98.4)	41.6 (106.9)	42.5 (108.5)	41.1 (106.0)	38.4 (101.1)	38.2 (100.8)	35.5 (95.9)	27.3 (81.1)	23.5 (74.3)	42.5 (108.5)
Mean daily maximum °C (°F)	6.0 (42.8)	10.0 (50.0)	15.8 (60.4)	22.4 (72.3)	27.9 (82.2)	32.6 (90.7)	32.5 (90.5)	30.9 (87.6)	27.2 (81.0)	21.7 (71.1)	14.2 (57.6)	8.1 (46.6)	20.8 (69.4)
Daily mean °C (°F)	0.9 (33.6)	4.3 (39.7)	9.9 (49.8)	16.3 (61.3)	21.9 (71.4)	26.7 (80.1)	27.8 (82.0)	26.3 (79.3)	21.9 (71.4)	16.1 (61.0)	8.9 (48.0)	2.9 (37.2)	15.3 (59.6)
Mean daily minimum °C (°F)	−3.1 (26.4)	−0.3 (31.5)	4.8 (40.6)	10.7 (51.3)	16.1 (61.0)	21.0 (69.8)	23.6 (74.5)	22.4 (72.3)	17.5 (63.5)	11.5 (52.7)	4.5 (40.1)	−1.1 (30.0)	10.6 (51.1)
Record low °C (°F)	−15.4 (4.3)	−14.2 (6.4)	−6.9 (19.6)	−2.3 (27.9)	2.9 (37.2)	11.8 (53.2)	16.6 (61.9)	13.3 (55.9)	7.2 (45.0)	−2.0 (28.4)	−8.8 (16.2)	−10.7 (12.7)	−15.4 (4.3)
Average precipitation mm (inches)	9.5 (0.37)	11.6 (0.46)	18.8 (0.74)	29.4 (1.16)	49.9 (1.96)	64.4 (2.54)	127.4 (5.02)	106 (4.2)	68.0 (2.68)	36.0 (1.42)	26.3 (1.04)	6.5 (0.26)	553.8 (21.85)
Average precipitation days (≥ 0.1 mm)	3.4	3.8	4.4	5.6	7.1	7.6	10.8	10.1	8.6	6.6	5.2	2.7	75.9
Average snowy days	4.0	3.2	0.9	0	0	0	0	0	0	0	1.0	2.4	11.5
Average relative humidity (%)	57	56	55	60	60	59	74	77	72	67	63	56	63
Mean monthly sunshine hours	112.1	122.6	162.0	192.8	215.2	192.6	166.6	169.1	148.0	147.9	133.5	126.9	1,889.3
Percentage possible sunshine	36	39	43	49	49	45	38	41	40	43	44	42	42
Source: China Meteorological Administration
