= China Railway Zhengzhou Group =

Chinese railway operator

China Railway Zhengzhou Group Co., Ltd.
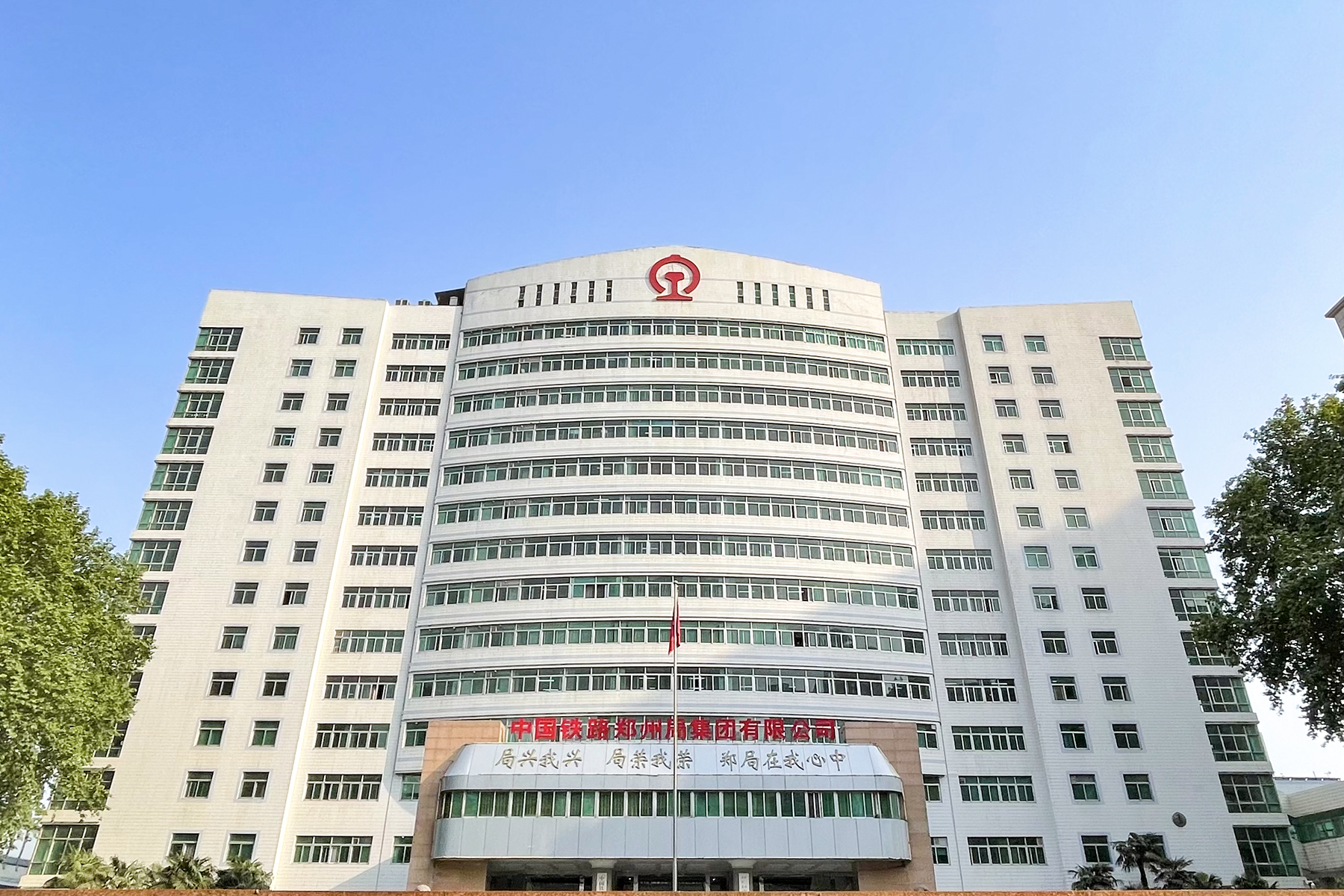
- Company type: state-owned enterprise
- Industry: Railway operations
- Predecessor: Zhengzhou Railway Administration
- Founded: 19 November 2017
- Headquarters: 106 Longhai M Road, Erqi, Zhengzhou, Henan, China
- Area served: Henan; Shanxi
- Owner: Government of China
- Parent: China Railway
- Website: Official Website

China Railway Zhengzhou Group
- Simplified Chinese: 中国铁路郑州局集团
- Traditional Chinese: 中國鐵路鄭州局集團
Transcriptions
Standard Mandarin
- Hanyu Pinyin: Zhōngguó Tiělù Zhèngzhōu Jú Jítuán

Zhengzhou Railway Administration
- Simplified Chinese: 郑州铁路局
- Traditional Chinese: 鄭州鐵路局
Transcriptions
Standard Mandarin
- Hanyu Pinyin: Zhèngzhōu Tiělù Jú

CR Zhengzhou
- Simplified Chinese: 郑铁
- Traditional Chinese: 鄭鐵
Transcriptions
Standard Mandarin
- Hanyu Pinyin: Zhèngtiě

China Railway Zhengzhou Group, officially abbreviated as CR Zhengzhou or CR-Zhengzhou, formerly, Zhengzhou Railway Administration is a subsidiary company under the jurisdiction of the China Railway (formerly the Ministry of Railway). It is responsible for the railways in Henan province.

Before the reform of national railway bureaus in March 2005, it also controlled railways in Hubei, south Shaanxi and south Shanxi. The current director of the bureau is Zhang Junbang.

== History ==
The precedent of Zhengzhou Railway Bureau was Zheng County Railway Station, founded in 1904. It was a station on the railway from Lugouqiao to Hankou. During Chinese Civil War following the end of Sino-Japanese War, Zhengzhou was occupied by the People's Liberation Army on October 22, 1948. Zhengzhou Associated Administration Commission, in charge of Longhai and Pinghan Railways in central China, was subsequently formed. In February 1949, it was renamed Central China Longhai and Pinghan Railways Associated Administration Bureau. In March of the same year, Zhengzhou Railway Management Bureau of Ministry of Railway of Chinese People's Revolutionary Military Commission was founded.

In September 1958, Zhengzhou Railway Bureau of Ministry of Railway was founded. In the following reorganization of railway bureaus, Ministry of Railway merged Wuhan Railway Bureau and Xi'an Railway Bureau into, and separated them from Zhengzhou Bureau several times. In the reform in 2005, Wuhan and Xi'an Bureaus were again separated from Zhengzhou Bureau.

Because the railway sections controlled by Zhengzhou Railway Bureau are the intersection of several major railway arteries in mainland China, Zhengzhou emerged into a railway transportation hub in China, and boasts influential status in China's railway history. During Cultural Revolution, Zhengzhou Bureau was once administrated by PLA army to ensure the normal operations.

The railway administration was reorganized as a company in November 2017.

== Hub stations ==
- Zhengzhou
  - Zhengzhou, Zhengzhou East, Zhengzhou Hangkonggang
- Luoyang
  - Luoyang, Luoyang Longmen
- Xinxiang
  - Xinxiang
- Shangqiu
  - Shangqiu

== Regional services ==
=== C-train services ===
- Zhengkai
- Zhengjiao
- Zhengji
