= Wuyiguangchang station =

Metro station in Taiyuan, China

Wuyiguangchang 五一广场
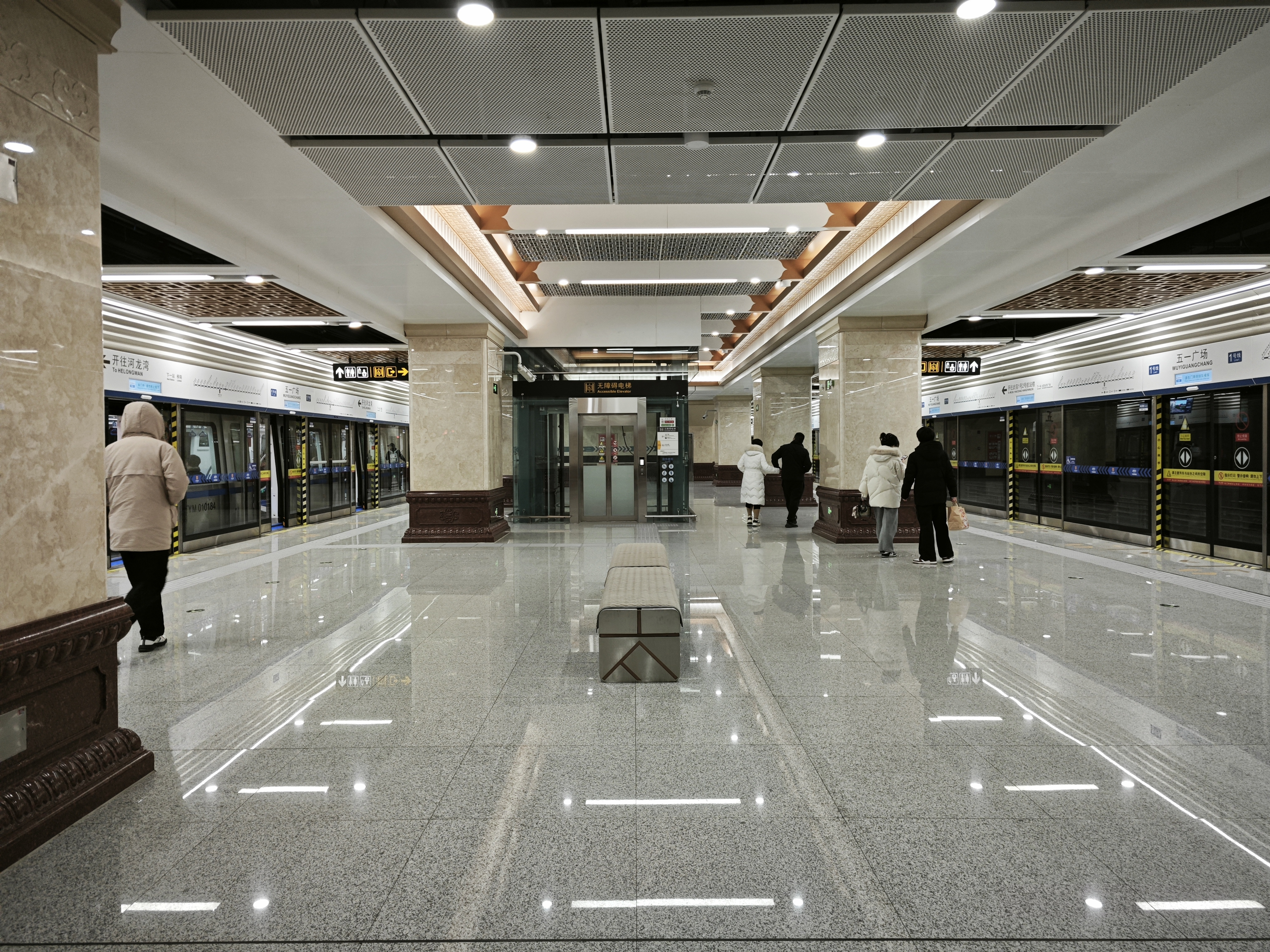
- Platforms

General information
- Location: Yingze Street × Wuyiguangchang Loop Road; Yingze District, Taiyuan, Shanxi; China
- Coordinates: 37°51′35″N 112°34′03″E
- System: Taiyuan Metro
- Line: Line 1
- Platforms: 2 (1 island platform)
- Tracks: 2

Construction
- Structure type: Underground
- Platform levels: 1
- Accessible: Yes

History
- Opened: 22 February 2025

Services
Preceding station	Taiyuan Metro	Following station
Liunan towards Helongwan	Line 1	Taiyuanzhan Xiguangchang towards Wusu 1Hao/2Hao Hangzhanlou
Location

Wuyiguangchang (simplified Chinese: 五一广场; traditional Chinese: 五一廣場; lit. 'Wuyi Square') is an metro station on Line 1 of the Taiyuan Metro. It is located in the Yingze District, Taiyuan, Shanxi, China. The station was opened on 22 February 2025.

== Station layout ==
Wuyiguangchang has two levels: a concourse, and an island platform with two tracks for line 1.

== Entrances/exits ==
- A: Wuyi Square
- B: Bingzhou Hotel
- C: Sanjin International Hotel
- D: Wuyi Square
