= Jincheng East railway station =

Railway station in Jincheng, Shanxi

Jincheng East 晋城东
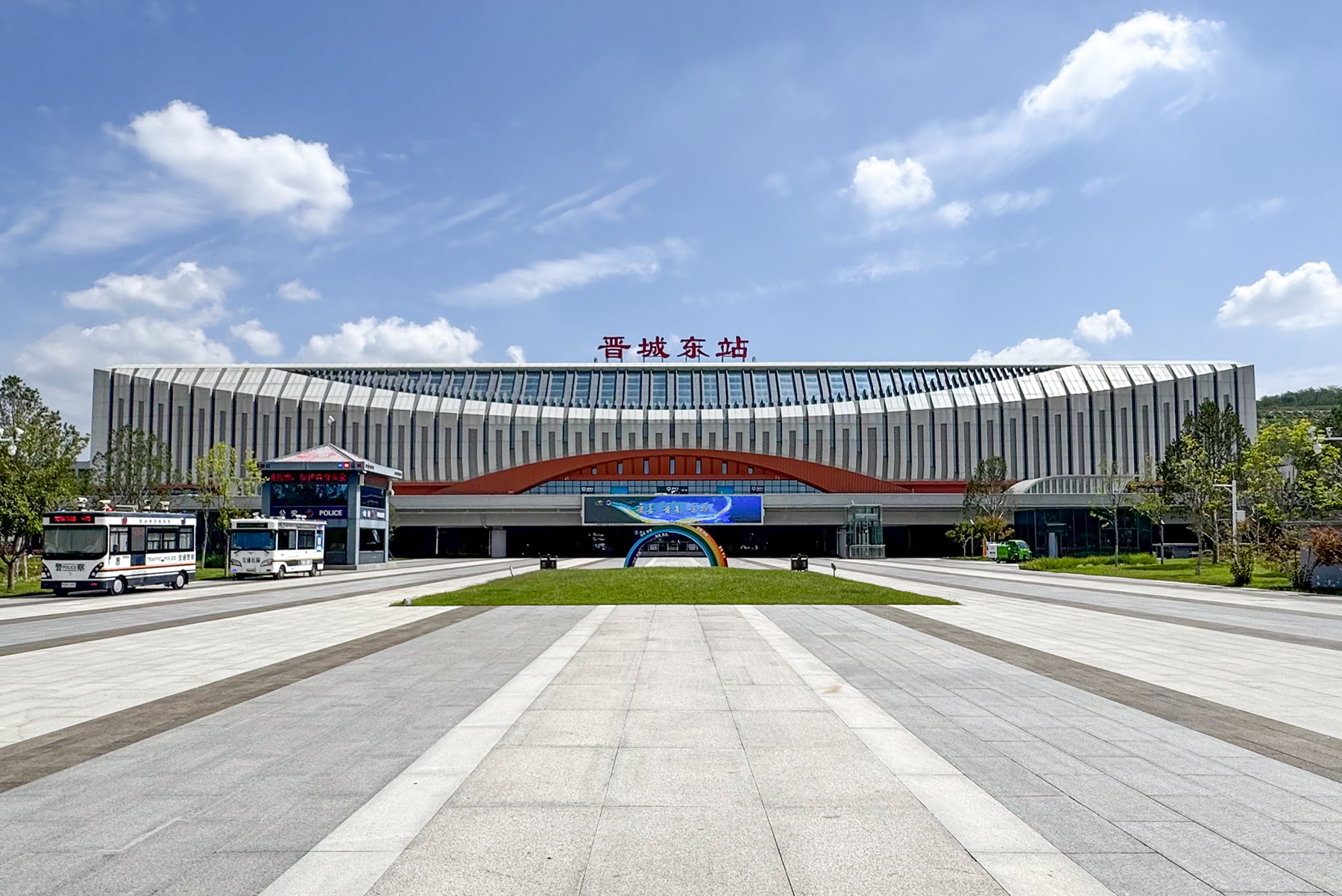

General information
- Location: Zezhou County, Jincheng, Shanxi; China
- Coordinates: 35°32′2.292″N 112°58′45.304″E
- Operated by: China Railway Zhengzhou Group
- Line: Taiyuan–Jiaozuo high-speed railway
- Platforms: 5

Other information
- Station code: 38468 (TMIS code); JGF (China Railway commercial code)

History
- Opened: 12 December 2020; 5 years ago

Services
Preceding station	China Railway High-speed	Following station
Gaoping East towards Taiyuan South	Taiyuan–Jiaozuo high-speed railway	Jiaozuo West towards Jiaozuo
Location

Jincheng East railway station (Chinese: 晋城东站) is a railway station in Shuidong Village, Zezhou County, Jincheng, Shanxi, China. It opened with the Taiyuan–Jiaozuo high-speed railway on 12 December 2020. Construction finished on 20 May 2020.

== Timetable ==
This is the timetable for this station (not including passing-by trains). Train routes in italics originate from this station, while a bolded one is a long-haul journey.

Train route designation	Destination	Departure time (UTC+8)
D3348	Taiyuan South	07:16
D3364	Taiyuan South	07:39
D2774/D2775	Taiyuan South	08:08
**D2782/D2783**	Baotou	08:14
D316/D317	Taiyuan South	08:28
**G3127/G3130**	Huangshan North	08:46
D3366	Taiyuan South	09:04
D3322	Taiyuan South	09:46
D3363	Jiaozuo	09:59
D3390/D3391	Taiyuan South	10:22
D3347	Zhengzhou	10:30
**D3148/D3149**	Taiyuan South	10:31
**G3209**	Guiyang North	10:38
**G7902**	Changzhi East	10:41
**G3131/G3134**	Shanghai Hongqiao	10:56
D3352	Taiyuan South	10:59
D3370	Taiyuan South	11:15
**G684**	Beijing Fengtai	11:25
D3372	Taiyuan South	11:55
**G7903**	Nanyang East	12:18
D3354	Taiyuan South	13:04
**G3135/G3138**	Ningbo	13:10
**G6648**	Changzhi East	13:23
**G695**	Guangzhou South	13:33
D3374	Taiyuan South	13:44
D3351	Zhengzhou	14:04
D3332	Taiyuan South	14:16
**G3144/G3145**	Taiyuan South	14:21
**G6649**	Zhoukou East	14:52
D3376	Taiyuan South	14:52
**G696**	Taiyuan South	15:09
D3330	Taiyuan South	15:18
D3353	Zhengzhou	15:28
**G692**	Taiyuan South	15:35
D3375	Jiaozuo	15:38
**G3136/G3137**	Taiyuan South	15:48
**G3143/G3146**	Shanghai Hongqiao	15:56
D3380	Taiyuan South	16:41
D2773/D2776	Zhengzhou East	16:48
D3382	Taiyuan South	17:00
D2785/D2788	Zhengzhou East	17:10
**D3356**	Taiyuan South	17:21
**G3147**	Lianyungang	17:44
D3358	Taiyuan South	17:55
D3384	Taiyuan South	18:00
D7854	Changzhi East	18:30
D3381	Jiaozuo	18:31
**G3132/G3133**	Taiyuan South	18:59
D3389/D3392	Zhengzhou East	19:11
**G3210**	Taiyuan South	19:22
**G691**	Wuhan	19:36
D3388	Taiyuan South	19:43
D7853/D7856	Zhengzhou East	19:48
**D2781/D2784**	Zhengzhou East	20:18
D315/D318	Zhengzhou East	20:30
**G3128/G3129**	Taiyuan South	21:48
