= Taiyuanzhan Xiguangchang station =

Metro station in Taiyuan, China

Taiyuanzhan Xiguangchang 太原站西广场
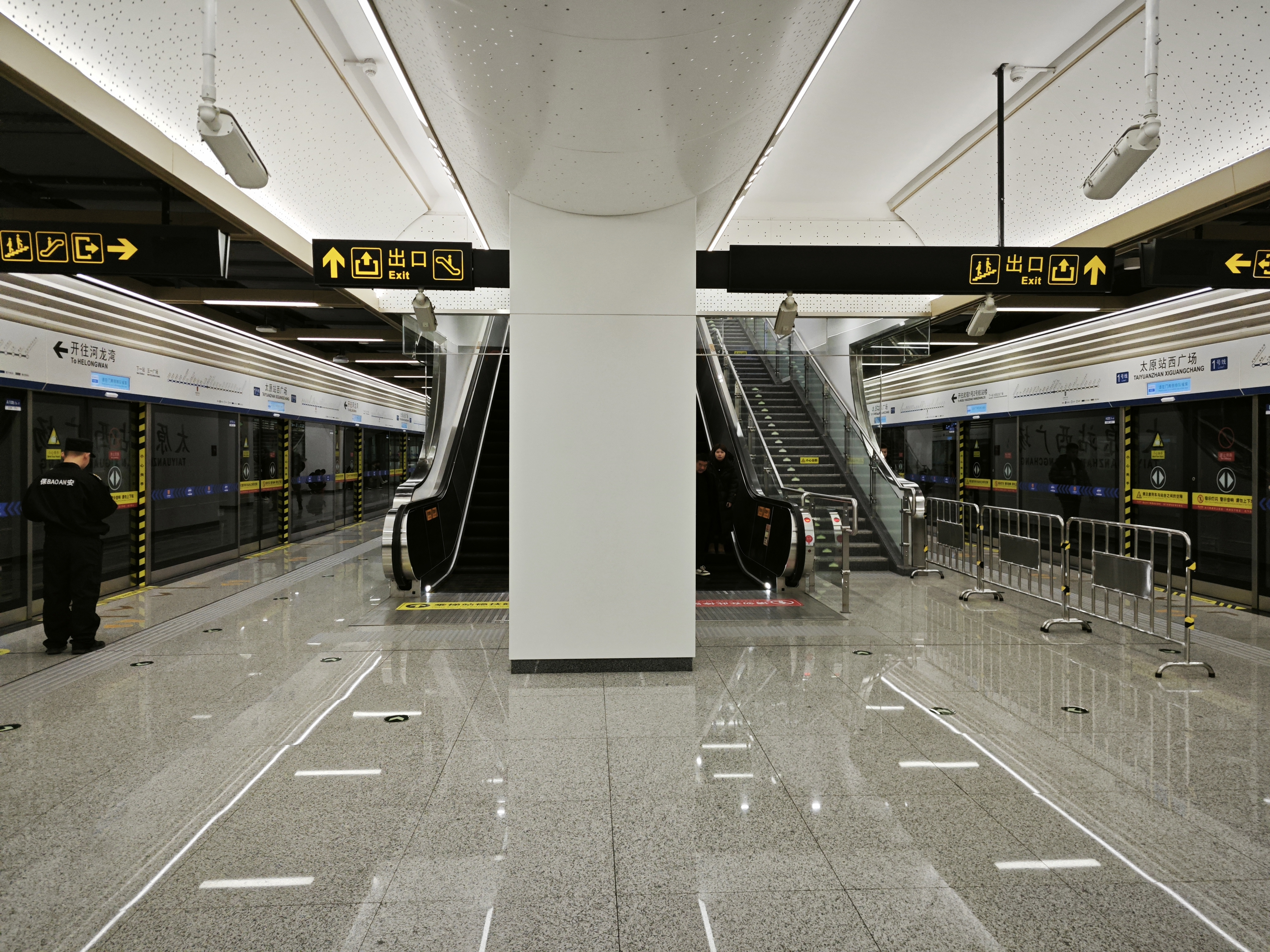
- Platforms

General information
- Location: Intersections of Yingze Street × South No.1 Alley, Wuyi East Street & North No.2 Alley, Qiaodong Street/Jianshe South Road; Yingze District, Taiyuan, Shanxi Province; China
- Coordinates: 37°51′35″N 112°34′37″E
- System: Taiyuan Metro
- Line: Line 1
- Platforms: 2 (1 island platform)
- Connections: Taiyuan

Construction
- Structure type: Underground
- Accessible: Yes

History
- Opened: 22 February 2025
- Former names: 建设北路南站 (lit. 'Jianshe North Road South station') (Project name)

Services
Preceding station	Taiyuan Metro	Following station
Wuyiguangchang towards Helongwan	Line 1	Taiyuanzhan Dongguangchang towards Wusu 1Hao/2Hao Hangzhanlou
Location

Taiyuanzhan Xiguangchang (simplified Chinese: 太原站西广场; traditional Chinese: 太原站西廣場; lit. 'Taiyuan Railway Station West Square') is an metro station on Line 1 of the Taiyuan Metro. It is located in the Yingze District, Taiyuan, Shanxi, China. The station is located under Yingze Street between South No.1 Alley, Wuyi East Street / North No.2 Alley, Qiaodong Street and Jianshe South Road.

== Station layout ==
Taiyuanzhan Xiguangchang has two levels: a concourse, and an island platform with two tracks for line 1.

== Entrances/exits ==
Taiyuanzhan Xiguangchang has five exits. Entrance D connects the subway of west square of Taiyuan railway station.

- A: Yingze Street (north), South No.1 Alley, Wuyi East Street
- B: Yingze Street (south), North No.2 Alley, Qiaodong Street
- C: Yingze Street (south), Jianshe South Road
- D: Taiyuan Railway Station West Square Pedestrian Underpass
- E: Yingze Street (north), Jianshe South Road

== See also ==
- Taiyuan railway station
