= Da'nanmen station =

Metro station in Taiyuan, China

Da'nanmen 大南门
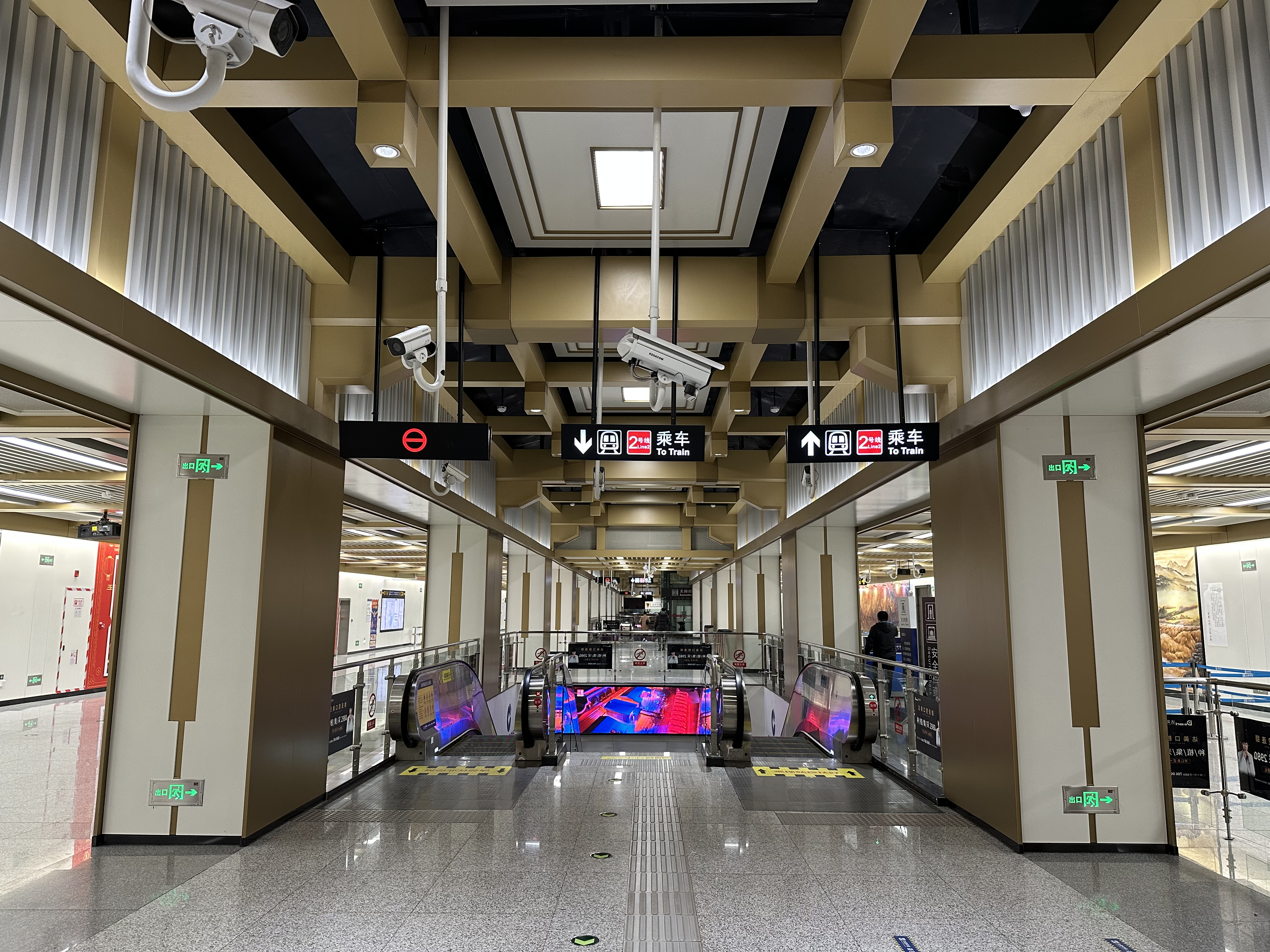
- Concourse of Line 2

General information
- Location: Yingze Street × Jiefang Road & Jiefang Road (S); Yingze District, Taiyuan, Shanxi; China
- Coordinates: 37°51′29″N 112°33′12″E
- System: Taiyuan Metro
- Lines: Line 1; Line 2
- Platforms: 4 (2 island platforms)
- Tracks: 4

Construction
- Structure type: Underground
- Platform levels: 2
- Accessible: Yes

History
- Opened: 26 December 2020 (Line 2); 22 February 2025 (Line 1)

Services
Preceding station	Taiyuan Metro	Following station
Taoyuanlu towards Helongwan	Line 1	Liunan towards Wusu 1Hao/2Hao Hangzhanlou
Kaihuasijie towards Jiancaoping	Line 2	Tiyuguan towards Xiqiao
Location

Da'nanmen (simplified Chinese: 大南门; traditional Chinese: 大南門) is an interchange station between Line 1 and Line 2 of the Taiyuan Metro. It is located in the Yingze District, Taiyuan, Shanxi, China. Line 2 began its service on 26 December 2020 and Line 1 began on 22 February 2025.

== Station layout ==
Da'nanmen has three levels: a concourse, and separate levels for lines 1 and 2. Each of these consists of an island platform with two tracks.

G	Ground level	Exits
B1	Concourse	Tickets, Customer Service Center, Convenient stores
B2		← Line 1 towards Helongwan (Taoyuanlu)
B2	Island Platform, doors will open on the left
B2		Line 1 towards Wusu 1Hao/2Hao Hangzhanlou (Liunan) →
B3		← Line 2 towards Jiancaoping (Kaihuasijie)
B3	Island Platform, doors will open on the left
B3		Line 2 towards Xiqiao (Tiyuguan) →

== Entrances/exits ==
- A: south side of Yingze Street, Nangong Road (E)
- B: east side of Jiefang Road (S), Nangong Street (S)
- C: Jingfeng International
- D: Yingze Park
- E: Yingze Park
- F: north side of Yingze Street, Zebei Alley
- G: east side of Jiefang Road, Houtiejiang Alley
- H: north side of Yingze Street, Nanhai Street
