= Line 2 (Taiyuan Metro) =

Metro line in Taiyuan, Shanxi, China

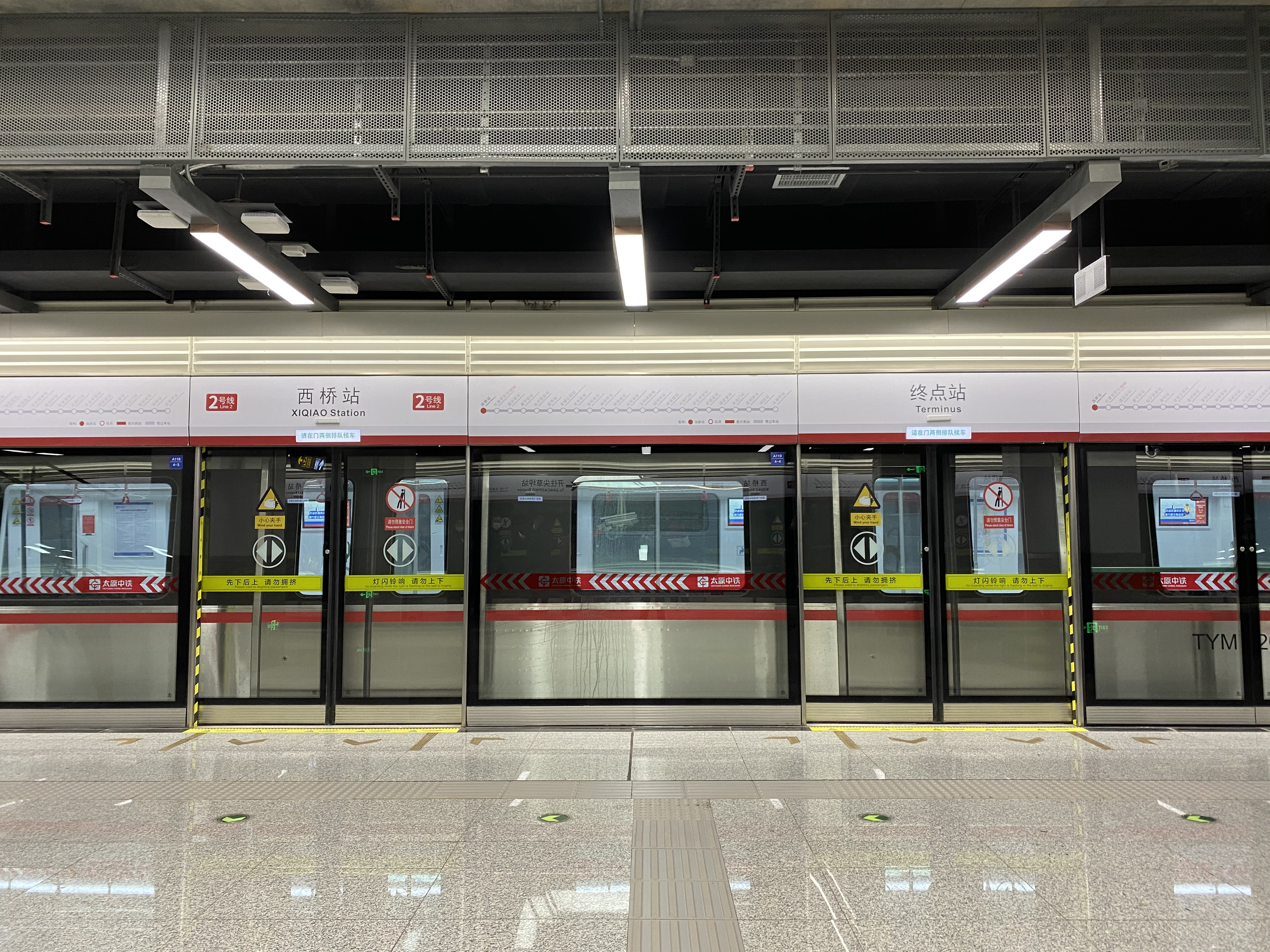
- Xiqiao station

Overview
- Status: In operation
- Locale: Taiyuan, Shanxi Province, China
- Termini: Jiancaoping; Xiqiao
- Stations: 24

Service
- Type: Rapid transit
- System: Taiyuan Metro
- Services: 1
- Operator(s): Taiyuan China Railway Rail Transit and Construction Co., Ltd.
- Daily ridership: 211,000 (2020 Peak)

History
- Work began: 2016
- Opened: 26 December 2020; 5 years ago
- Last extension: 2025

Technical
- Line length: 23.647 km (14.694 mi)
- Number of tracks: 2
- Character: Underground
- Track gauge: 1,435 mm (4 ft 8 1/2 in)

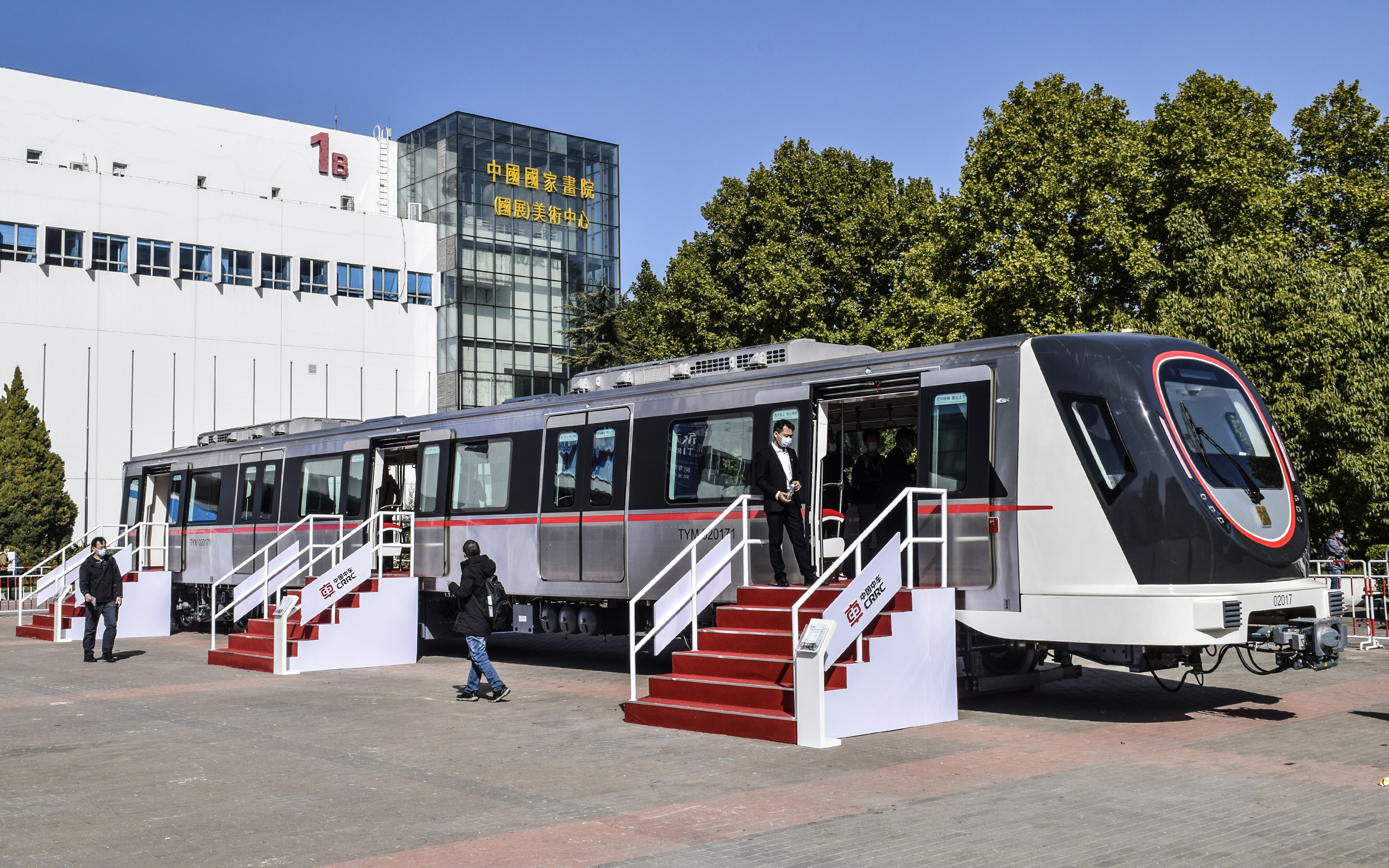
Line 2 train

The Line 2 of Taiyuan Metro is the first line in Taiyuan, as well as the first line in Shanxi. The line opened on December 26, 2020.

== Opening timeline ==
Segment	Commencement	Length	Station(s)	Name
Jiancaoping — Xiqiao	26 December 2020	23.647 km (14.69 mi)	23	Phase 1
Huazhangxijie	25 May 2025	N/A	1	Infill station

== Stations ==
Phase 1 of Line 2 runs from Jiancaoping in the north to Xiqiao in the south and has 23 stations.

Station Name		Transfer	Distance km	District
English	Chinese	Transfer	Distance km	District
Jiancaoping	尖草坪站			Jiancaoping
Jianhe	涧河站			Jiancaoping
Shenglijie	胜利街站			Xinghualing
Dabeimen	大北门站			Xinghualing
Jihuying	缉虎营站			Xinghualing
Fuxijie	府西街站			Xinghualing
Kaihuasijie	开化寺街站			Yingze
Da'nanmen	大南门站	1		Yingze
Tiyuguan	体育馆站			Yingze
Nanneihuan	南内环站			Yingze
Wangcunnanjie	王村南街站			Xiaodian
Changfengjie	长风街站			Xiaodian
Xuefujie	学府街站			Xiaodian
Nanzhonghuan	南中环站			Xiaodian
Jinyangjie	晋阳街站			Xiaodian
Longxingjie	龙兴街站			Xiaodian
Longchenggongyuan	龙城公园站			Xiaodian
Jiajie	嘉节站			Xiaodian
Dianzixijie	电子西街站			Xiaodian
Kangningjie	康宁街站			Xiaodian
Tongdajie	通达街站			Xiaodian
Huazhangxijie	化章西街站			Xiaodian
Xiqiao	西桥站			Xiaodian

== Construction ==
Line 2 began construction in March 2016, as of July 2020, construction of all 23 stations are complete.

In phase 1, it has a total length of 23.647 km, 23 stations, 2 electrical stations and 1 control centre.

=== Security ===
There will be 3,500 cameras installed during Phase 1 alone, Dananmen Station (大南门站), a major interchange station, has 231 cameras installed. All trains are unmanned and equipped with state-of-the-art technology.
