= Line 1 (Taiyuan Metro) =

Metro line in Taiyuan, Shanxi, China

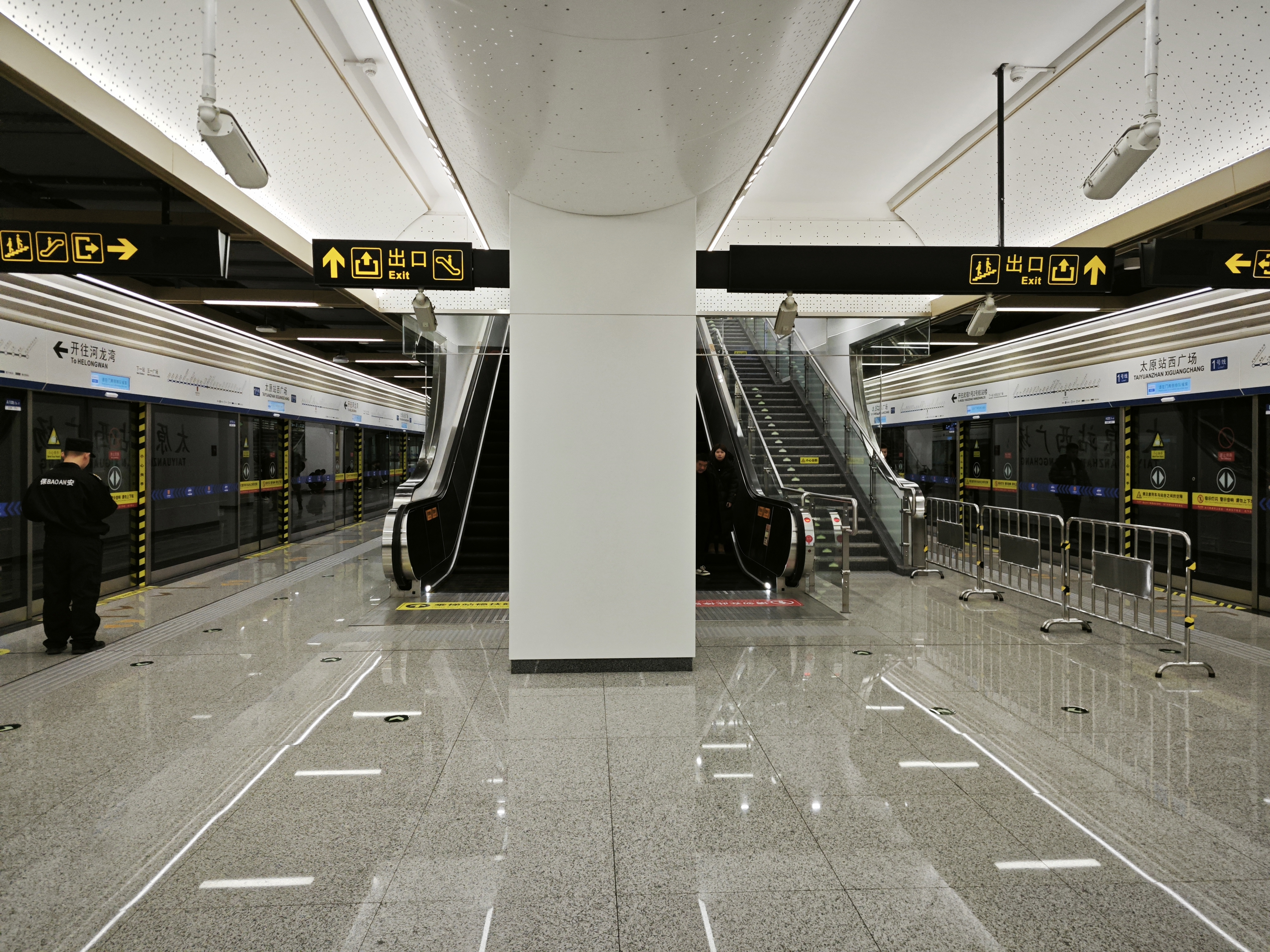
- Taiyuanzhan Xiguangchang station

Overview
- Status: In operation
- Locale: Taiyuan, Shanxi Province, China
- Termini: Helongwan; Wusu 1Hao/2Hao Hangzhanlou
- Stations: 24

Service
- Type: Rapid transit
- System: Taiyuan Metro
- Services: 1
- Depot(s): Malianying depot Xishan parking lot
- Daily ridership: 235,600 (February 22, 2025)

History
- Commenced: 2019
- Opened: 22 February 2025; 17 months ago

Technical
- Line length: 28.737 km (17.856 mi)
- Number of tracks: 2
- Character: Underground
- Track gauge: 1,435 mm (4 ft 8 1/2 in)

The Line 1 of Taiyuan Metro is the second metro line in Taiyuan. The line opened on February 22, 2025.

== Opening timeline ==
Segment	Commencement	Length	Station(s)	Name
Helongwan — Wusu 1Hao/2Hao Hangzhanlou	February 22, 2025	28.737 km (17.86 mi)	24	Phase 1

== Stations ==
Phase 1 of Line 1 runs from Helongwan in the northwest to Wusu 1Hao/2Hao Hangzhanlou in the southeast and has 24 stations. Phase 2 includes Wusu 3Hao Hangzhanlou station, the station will be constructed together with the terminal 3 of Wusu Airport.

Station Name		Connections	Distance km	District
English	Chinese	Connections	Distance km	District
Helongwan	河龙湾站			Wanbailin
Ximinglu	西铭路站			Wanbailin
Xikezhan	西客站	Taiyuan West		Wanbailin
Jinyanglu	金阳路站			Wanbailin
Yanjiagou (Xiaojingyulu)	闫家沟（小井峪路）站			Wanbailin
Xiayuan	下元站			Wanbailin
Taiyuanligongdaxue	太原理工大学站			Wanbailin
Taoyuanlu	桃园路站			Yingze
Da'nanmen	大南门站	2		Yingze
Liunan	柳南站			Yingze
Wuyiguangchang	五一广场站			Yingze
Taiyuanzhan Xiguangchang	太原站西广场站	TYV		Yingze
Taiyuanzhan Dongguangchang	太原站东广场站	TYV		Yingze
Haojiagou	郝家沟站			Yingze
Chaoyangjie	朝阳街站			Yingze
Shuangta	双塔站			Yingze
Nanshifangjie	南十方街站			Yingze
Changfengdongjie	长风东街站			Yingze
Xuefudongjie	学府东街站			Xiaodian
Xutandongjie	许坦东街站			Xiaodian
Taiyuannanzhan	太原南站	TNV		Xiaodian
Beiying	北营站			Xiaodian
Huangling	黄陵站			Xiaodian
Wusu 1Hao/2Hao Hangzhanlou	武宿1号2号航站楼站	TYN		Xiaodian
Wusu 3Hao Hangzhanlou	武宿3号航站楼站	TYN		Xiaodian

== Construction ==
Line 1 began construction in December 2019.

In phase 1, it has a total length of 28.737 km, 24 stations and 2 depots.

The length of phase 2 is 1.85km. It only has 1 station to connect new terminal 3 of Wusu Airport, which will be opened in 2027. The Phase 2 of line 1 extension is not approved and in the future, only shuttle buses will be provided to transport passenger between Terminal 1, 2 and Terminal 3 of Wusu Airport.
