= Taiyuan southwest ring line =

Railway line in Taiyuan, Shanxi, China

The Taiyuan southwest ring line (Chinese: 太原铁路枢纽西南环线) is a twin-track electrified railway line in Taiyuan, Shanxi, China.

== History ==
Construction of the line was discussed as early as 2008. The line opened on 11 December 2019.

== Route ==
The line is 55.5 kilometres (34.5 mi) long and has three tunnels with a combined length of over 20 kilometres (12 mi). The line allows freight services to bypass Taiyuan and Taiyuan South stations and avoid central Taiyuan. It also connects freight stations including Zhongdingwuliuyuan railway station.
