= Liaocheng–Handan–Changzhi high-speed railway =

Planned railway line in China

The Liaocheng–Handan–Changzhi high-speed railway is a planned high-speed railway line in China. It is expected to have a length of 279 kilometres (173 miles) and a maximum speed of 350 kilometres per hour (220 miles per hour).

== Route ==
The line starts at Liaocheng West railway station and heads east. It crosses the Shijiazhuang–Wuhan high-speed railway at Handan. East–north and West–north chords are planned to connect the two lines south of Handan East railway station. The line ends at Changzhi East railway station on the Taiyuan–Jiaozuo high-speed railway.

=== Stations ===
Station Name		CR Connections
English	Chinese	CR Connections
Liaocheng West	聊城西	Beijing–Shangqiu high-speed railway Zhengzhou–Jinan high-speed railway
Guanxian South	冠县南	
Guantao South	馆陶南	
Daming North	大名北	
Weixian	魏县	
Cheng'an	成安	
Handan South	邯郸南	
Wu'an South	武安南	
Shexian South	涉县南	
Licheng South	黎城南	
Changzhi East	长治东	Taiyuan–Jiaozuo high-speed railway
