= Liu Suiji =

Chinese politician and police officer

- 柳遂记

Secretary of Taiyuan Political and Legal Affairs Committee
- In office 2006 – August 2014
- Succeeded by: Wang Fan

Head of the Taiyuan Public Security Bureau
- In office December 2012 – August 2014
- Preceded by: Li Yali
- Succeeded by: Wang Fan

Personal details
- Born: December 1956 (age 69) Pinglu County, Shanxi, China
- Party: Chinese Communist Party (1982–2015; expelled)
- Spouse: Wang Liping
- Education: Lanzhou University

Chinese name
- Traditional Chinese: 柳遂記
- Simplified Chinese: 柳遂记
Transcriptions
Standard Mandarin
- Hanyu Pinyin: Liǔ Suíjì

Liu Suiji (Chinese: 柳遂记; born December 1956) is a former Chinese politician and police officer from Shanxi Province. Liu served as the Secretary of the Taiyuan Political and Legislative Affairs Committee (Zhengfawei), in addition to being the provincial capital's police chief. In August 2014 Liu was placed under investigation by the Communist Party's anti-corruption agency.

== Education ==
Liu was born and raised in Pinglu County, Shanxi, he graduated from Lanzhou University in 1982, majoring in history.

== Career ==
He entered politics in 1973 and joined the Chinese Communist Party (CCP) in July 1982.

After college, he was assigned to Taiyuan as an officer, serving in various administrative and political roles.

In 2006 he became a Standing Committee member of the CCP Taiyuan Committee and was elevated to the Secretary of Taiyuan Political and Legal Affairs Committee. He remained in that post until August 2014. He also served as the Party Secretary of Taiyuan Public Security Bureau between December 2012 to August 2014.

== Investigation ==
On August 24, 2014, Liu Suiji was being investigated by the Central Commission for Discipline Inspection of the CCP for "serious violations of laws and regulations" and removed from his government posts by the Shanxi People's Government. His predecessor, Tian Yubao, was sacked for graft in November 2014. Liu was expelled from the party on December 3, 2015. In 2018, he was sentenced to 19 years for accepting bribes, holding a huge amount of property from an unidentified source and abusing his power. He was also fined 2 million yuan. His wife Wang Liping (王丽萍) was sentenced to 3 years and fined 500,000 yuan.

Party political offices
Preceded by Tian Yubao	Communist Party Secretary of Xiaodian District; 2002–2006	Succeeded by Zhang Jinwang
Preceded by ?	Secretary of Taiyuan Political and Legal Affairs Committee; 2006–2014	Succeeded by Wang Fan
Government offices
Preceded by Zhao Xiangcheng	Magistrate of Nanjiao District; 1996–1997	Succeeded by Position revoked
New title	Magistrate of Xiaodian District; 1998–2002	Succeeded by Rong Fuxiang
Preceded by Li Yali	Head of the Taiyuan Public Security Bureau; 2013–2014	Succeeded by Wang Fan
