= Tian Yubao =

Chinese politician

- 田玉宝

Vice Chairman of Taiyuan Municipal People's Congress
- In office June 2007 – May 2012

Communist Party Secretary of Xiaodian District
- In office January 1998 – June 2002
- Preceded by: New title
- Succeeded by: Liu Suiji

Communist Party Secretary of Nanjiao District
- In office 17 March 1995 – December 1997
- Preceded by: Peng Fu
- Succeeded by: Position revoked

Personal details
- Born: December 24, 1951 (age 74) Taiyuan, Shanxi, China
- Party: Chinese Communist Party (expelled)

Chinese name
- Traditional Chinese: 田玉寶
- Simplified Chinese: 田玉宝
Transcriptions
Standard Mandarin
- Hanyu Pinyin: Tián Yùbáo

Tian Yubao (born 24 December 1951) is a Chinese politician of Hui ethnicity. He was investigated by the Central Commission for Discipline Inspection in November 2014. Previously he served as the Chairman of Taiyuan Municipal People's Congress.

== Life ==
Tian was born and raised in Taiyuan, Shanxi, in an ethnic Hui family. It is not clear if he has a university degree.

In 1995 he became the Chinese Communist Party Committee Secretary of Nanjiao District, a position he held until May 1997, when he was appointed the party chief of Xiaodian District. When he presided over party work in Xiaodian, Liu Suiji was district governor; when he left Xiaodian, Liu succeeded him as party chief there.

In 2002 he was transferred to a position in Taiyuan, capital of Shanxi province, and appointed the Vice-Chairman of Taiyuan Municipal People's Congress (futingji), where he was put in charge of legal work and led party-related work.

Tian Yubao retired in May 2012, and disappeared from public life.

== Downfall ==
On November 3, 2014, it was announced that Tian would be investigated by the Shanxi Commission for Discipline Inspection for "serious violations of laws and regulations". He was detained by on December 11. After a quick investigation, Tian was expelled from the Chinese Communist Party on December 26. He was accused of taking large bribes and also purchasing stock in a manner that violated regulations. His retirement benefits were also rescinded by the state, and his case was moved to judicial authorities for prosecution.

On June 16, 2016, he was sentenced to 13 years and fined 500,000 yuan for taking bribes and holding a huge amount of property without legal sources. All his illegal gains will be confiscated and handed over to the State.

Party political offices
Preceded by Peng Fu (彭富)	Communist Party Secretary of Nanjiao District; 1995–1997	Succeeded by Revocation
New title	Communist Party Secretary of Xiaodian District; 1998–2002	Succeeded by Liu Suiji
