= Changzhi South railway station =

Railway station in Changzhi, Shanxi, China

Changzhi South 长治南
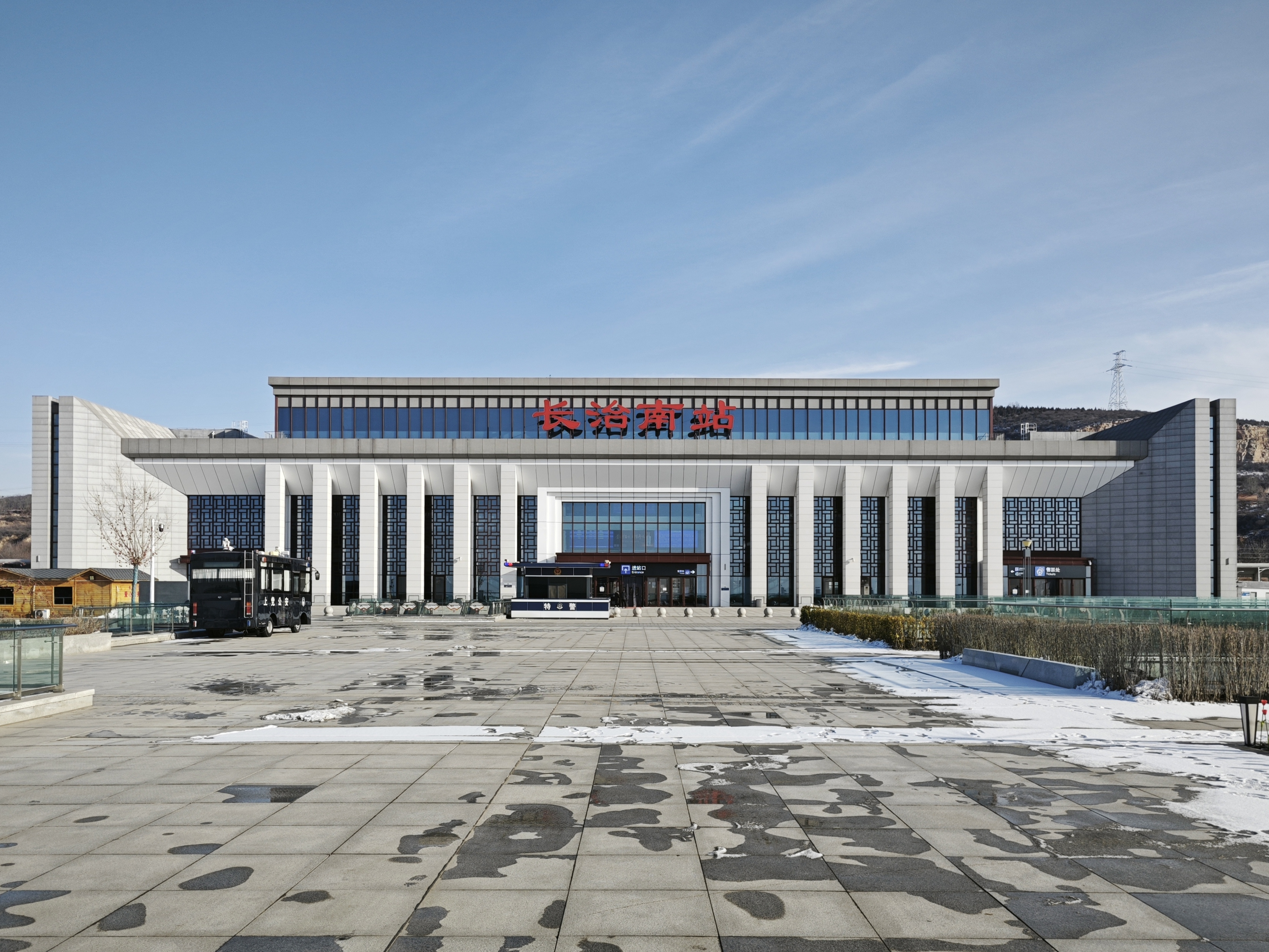

General information
- Location: Shangdang District, Changzhi, Shanxi; China
- Coordinates: 35°5′30.86″N 113°6′2.19″E
- Operated by: China Railway Zhengzhou Group
- Line: Taiyuan–Jiaozuo high-speed railway
- Platforms: 2

History
- Opened: 12 December 2020; 5 years ago

Services
Preceding station	China Railway High-speed	Following station
Changzhi East towards Taiyuan South	Taiyuan–Jiaozuo high-speed railway	Gaoping East towards Jiaozuo
Location

Changzhi South railway station (Chinese: 长治南站) is a railway station in Sudian Town, Shangdang District, Changzhi, Shanxi, China. It opened with the Taiyuan–Jiaozuo high-speed railway on 12 December 2020.

== Station layout ==
2F; Waiting area	Platform 2 concourse	Ticket gates and waiting area for trains departing from platform 2, connection bridge to platform 2, toilets
1F; Entrance and platforms
1F; Entrance and platforms	←Towards Gaoping East	Towards Changzhi East→
1F; Entrance and platforms	West Station entrance and exit, ticket gates and waiting area for trains departing from platform 1, toilets
1F; Entrance and platforms	Side platform, the left door opens
1F; Entrance and platforms	Platform 1	Taiyuan–Jiaozuo high speed trains→
1F; Entrance and platforms	Main line	Taiyuan–Jiaozuo high speed trains passing by→
1F; Entrance and platforms	Main line	←Taiyuan–Jiaozuo high speed trains passing by
1F; Entrance and platforms	Platform 2	←Taiyuan–Jiaozuo high speed trains
1F; Entrance and platforms	Side platform, the left door opens
1F; Entrance and platforms	East
B1F	Transportation	Bus stop, taxi stand, pick-up/drop-off zone, subway connecting the station exit and platform 2
B2F		Carpark

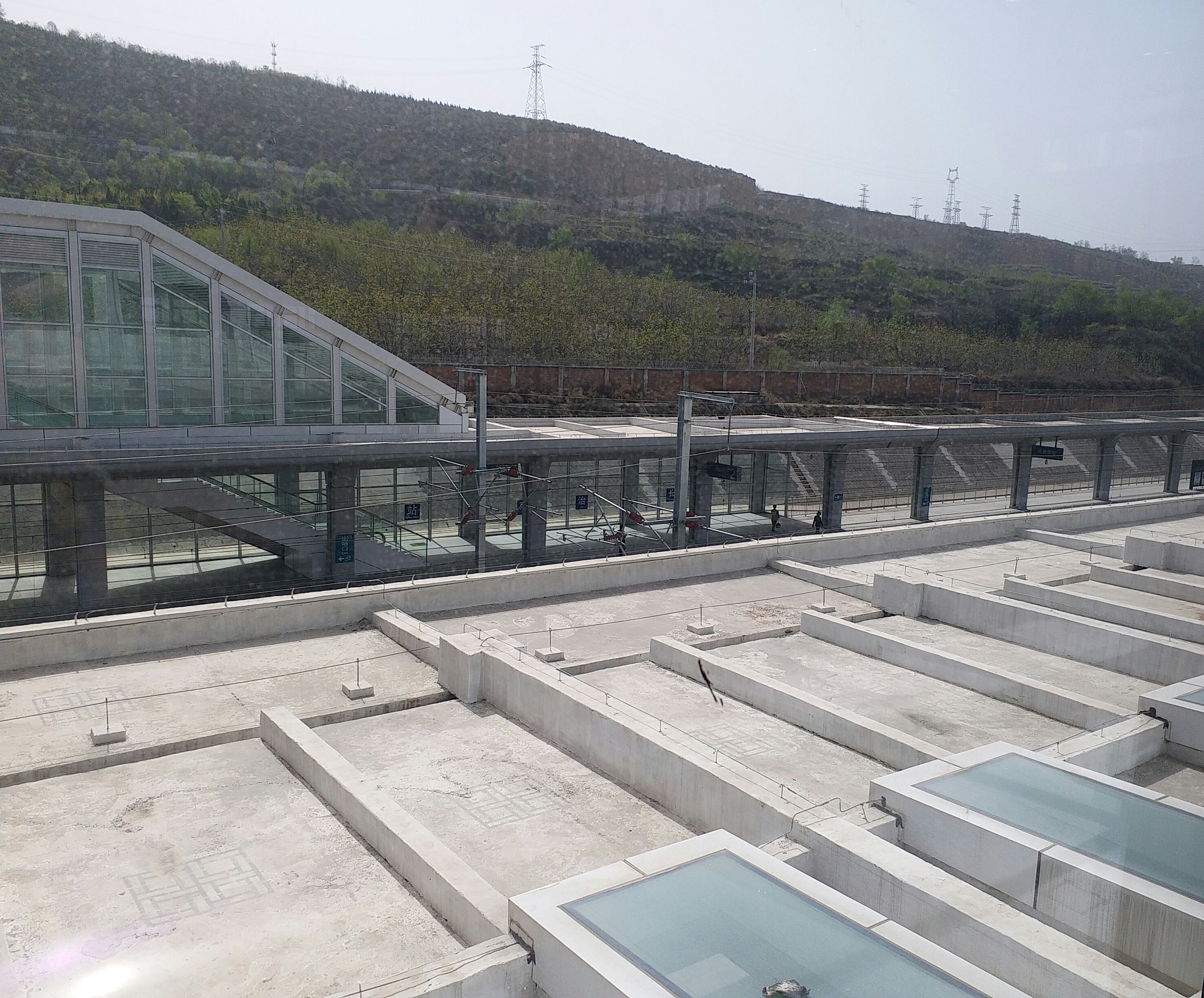
Platform 2 seen from waiting area

== Timetable ==
This is the timetable for this station (not including passing-by trains); all northbound trains (to Taiyuan South) depart from platform 1, while all southbound trains depart from platform 2.

Train route designation	Destination	Departure time (UTC+8)	Platform
G3127/G3130	Huangshan North	08:21	2
D3366	Taiyuan South	09:30	1
D3363	Jiaozuo	09:34	2
D3347	Zhengzhou	09:57	2
G3131/G3134	Shanghai Hongqiao	10:31	2
G7961	Shenqiu North	11:13	2
D3372	Taiyuan South	12:21	1
D3374	Taiyuan South	14:19	1
G6649	Zhoukou East	14:27	2
D3376	Taiyuan South	15:18	1
G3136/G3137	Taiyuan South	16:14	1
D2773/D2776	Zhengzhou East	16:16	2
D2785/D2788	Zhengzhou East	16:44	2
D3356	Taiyuan South	17:55	1
D3389/D3392	Zhengzhou East	18:40	2
G3132/G3133	Taiyuan South	19:32	1
D315/D318	Zhengzhou East	19:58	2
D3388	Taiyuan South	20:09	1
D3357/D3360	Zhengzhou East	20:27	2
G3128/G3129	Taiyuan South	22:14	1
