= Taiyuan railway station (Shanxi) =

Railway station in China

Taiyuan 太原
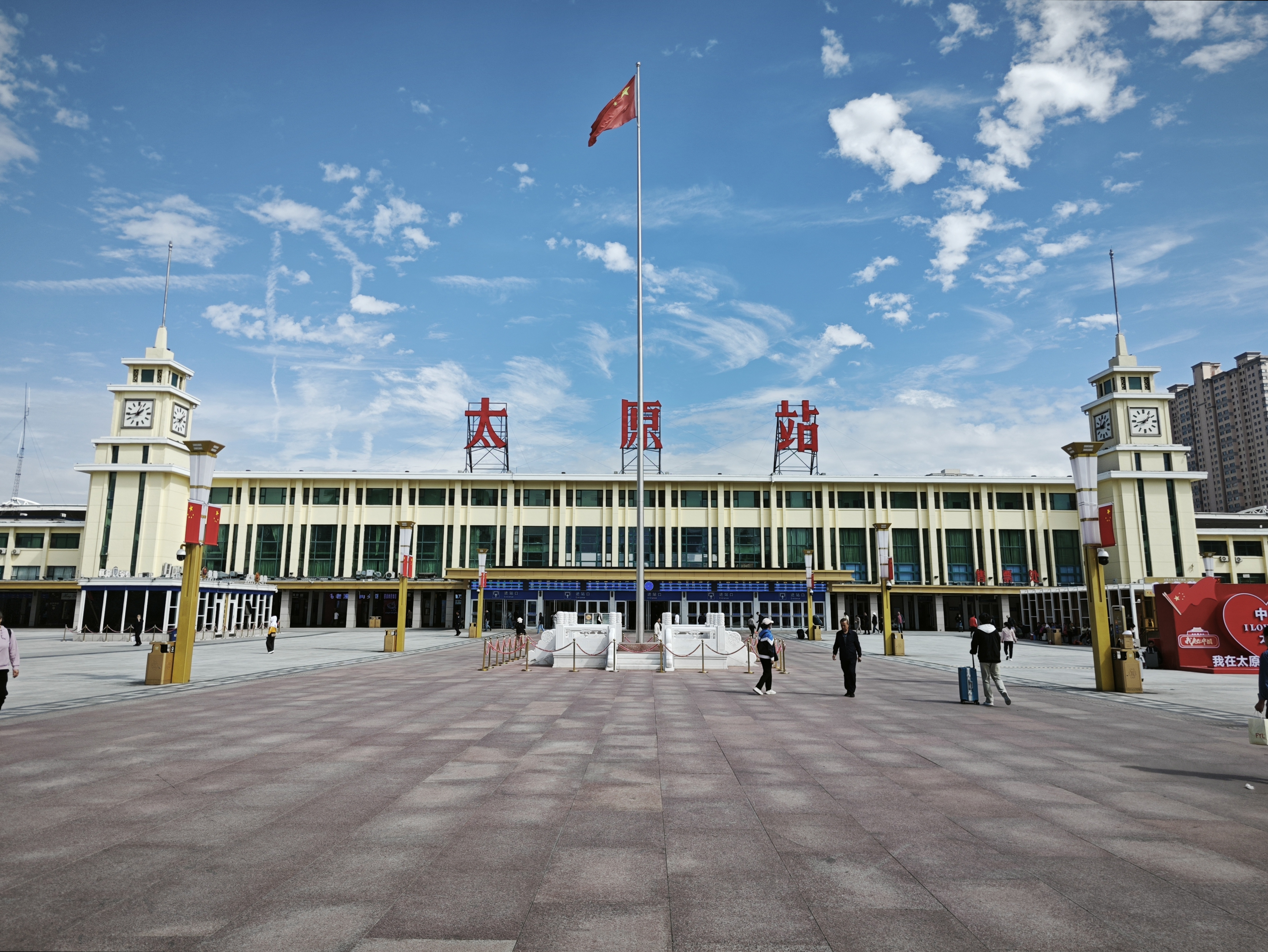
- Taiyuan Railway Station

General information
- Location: Jianshe North Road; Yingze District, Taiyuan, Shanxi; China
- Coordinates: 37°51′35.5″N 112°34′54.5″E
- Operator: Daqin Railway Co., Ltd.
- Lines: Datong–Puzhou railway; Shijiazhuang–Taiyuan railway; Taiyuan–Xingxian railway; Shijiazhuang–Taiyuan high-speed railway; Datong–Xi'an high-speed railway
- Platforms: 4
- Connections: Bus terminal

Other information
- Station code: TMIS code: 26447; Telegraph code: TYV; Pinyin code: TYU
- Classification: Top Class station

History
- Opened: 1907; 119 years ago
Location

Taiyuan Railway Station (Chinese: 太原站; pinyin: Tàiyuán Zhàn) is a railway station on the Tongpu Railway, Shitai Railway and Shitai Passenger Railway. It is located in Taiyuan, Shanxi, China.

== History ==
Construction was started in 1904. The station opened in 1907.

== Metro station ==
There are two metro stations serve the railway station.

=== West square ===
The metro station on the west square is a separated station called Taiyuanzhan Xiguangchang.

=== East square ===
Taiyuanzhan Dongguangchang 太原站东广场

General information
- Location: East square, Taiyuan railway station Yingze District, Taiyuan, Shanxi Province; China
- System: Taiyuan Metro
- Line: Line 1
- Platforms: 2 (1 island platform)
- Connections: Taiyuan

Construction
- Structure type: Underground

History
- Opened: 22 February 2025

Services
Preceding station	Taiyuan Metro	Following station
Taiyuanzhan Xiguangchang towards Helongwan	Line 1	Haojiagou towards Wusu 1Hao/2Hao Hangzhanlou
Location

The metro station on the east square is called Taiyuanzhan Dongguangchang (Chinese: 太原站东广场; lit. 'Taiyuan Railway Station East Square') on Line 1 of the Taiyuan Metro. It is located in the Yingze District of Taiyuan, under the east square of railway station.

==== Station layout ====
Taiyuanzhan Dongguangchang has four levels. Basement 1 is a parking lot of the east square of railway station. Basement 2 is a concourse of metro station. Basement 3 is an equipment area. Basement 4 an island platform with two tracks for line 1.

==== Entrances/exits ====
- A: East square, Taiyuan railway station
- B: Yingze Street (south), Shuangta North Road (east)
- C: Yingze Street (north), Shuangta North Road (east)

== See also ==
- Taiyuan South railway station
