= Jiaozuo West railway station =

Railway station in Jiaozuo, Henan, China

Jiaozuoxi Railway Station
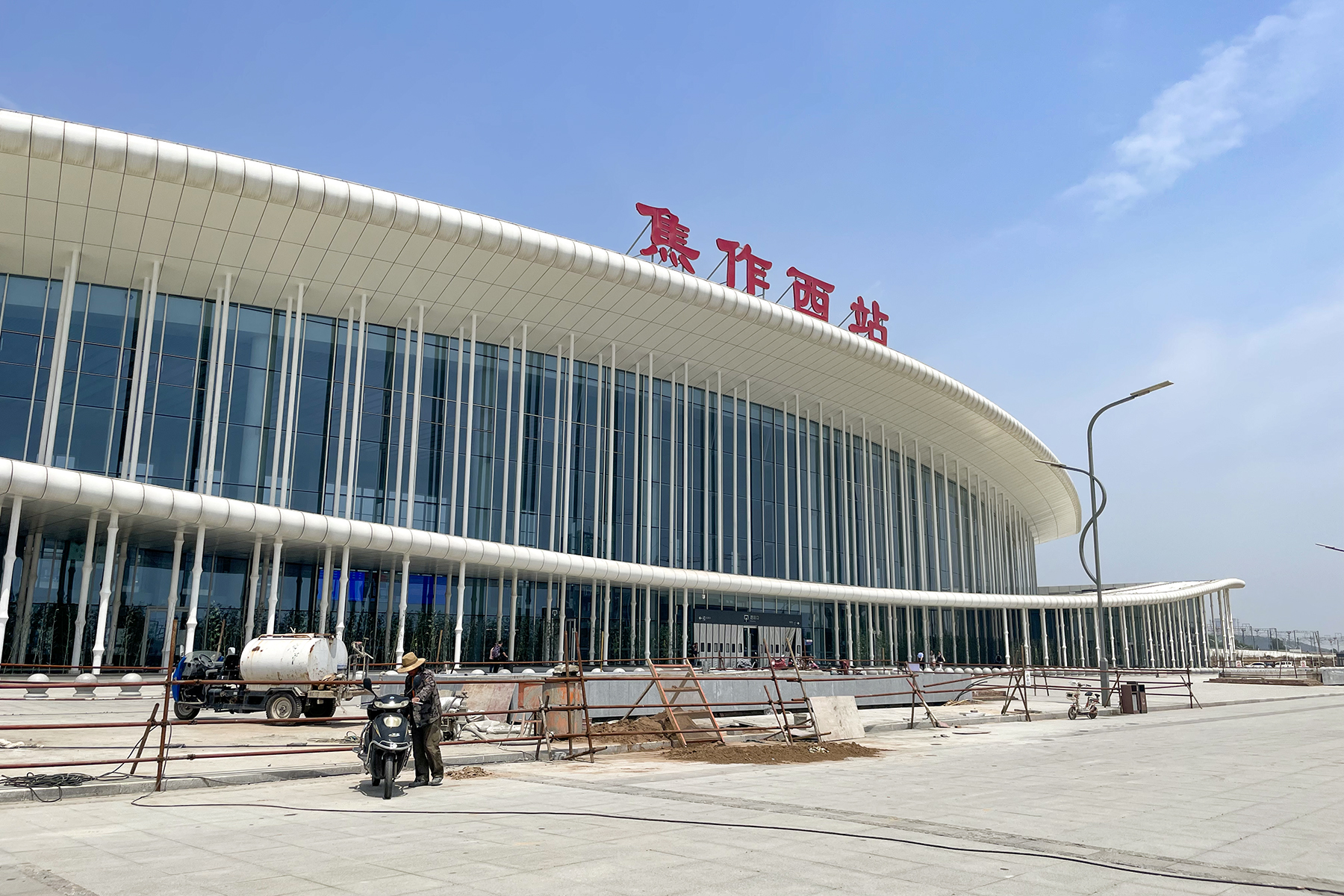
- Station building in May 2023

General information
- Location: Yueshan Town, Bo'ai County, Jiaozuo, Henan Province; China
- Coordinates: 35.208571°N 113.056002°E
- Operator: China Railway Zhengzhou Group, Jiaozuo Train Operation Depot
- Lines: Zhengzhou–Jiaozuo intercity railway; Taiyuan–Jiaozuo high-speed railway
- Platforms: 2 (2 island platforms)
- Tracks: 6

Other information
- Status: Operational
- Station code: 38470 (TMIS code), JIF (telegraph code), JZX (pinyin code)

History
- Opened: 12 December 2020
- Former names: Bo'ai Railway Station
Location

Jiaozuo West Railway Station also known as Jiaozuoxi Railway Station. (Chinese: 焦作西站) is a railway station located in Bo'ai County, Jiaozuo, Henan Province, China. It is an intermediate station on the Zhengzhou–Taiyuan high-speed railway and opened on December 12, 2020.

== History ==
Originally named Bo'ai Railway Station during its construction phase, the station was renamed Jiaozuoxi Railway Station in June 2020. It opened on December 12, 2020, along with the inauguration of the Taiyuan–Jiaozuo high-speed railway (the northern section of the Zhengzhou–Taiyuan high-speed railway).

== Station Structure ==
The station building has two main floors and one partial basement floor. It measures 198 meters in length, 64 meters in width, and reaches a height of 23.4 meters, with a total floor area of 12,000 square meters. On the ground floor, the central area serves as the waiting hall, flanked by ticket offices, restrooms, soft-seat waiting rooms, and a mother-and-child room. The mezzanine areas on the sides of the waiting hall house passenger services and office spaces.

The station yard is located to the north of the station building. It has 2 island platforms serving 6 tracks (2 main lines and 4 arrival-departure tracks). One underground passage is used for passenger entry and another for exit, connecting the platforms with the station building.

== Passenger Train Destinations ==
As of May 2021, Jiaozuoxi Railway Station had 6 passenger trains stopping per day, all of which are through trains. The destinations are as follows:

| Railway Operator | Destinations |
|---|---|
| Taiyuan Group | Huangshan North, Jiaozuo, Ningbo, Taiyuan South |
| Zhengzhou Group | Changzhi East, Taiyuan South |

== See also ==
- Yueshan railway station
