= LCX =

LCX may refer to:

- Left circumflex artery, or circumflex branch of left coronary artery
- Liancheng Guanzhishan Airport, in Longyan, Fujian, China, IATA airport code LCX
- Liaocheng West railway station, in Shandong, China, pinyin station code LCX
