= Taigu West railway station =

Railway station in Shanxi, China

Taigu West 太谷西站

General information
- Location: Taigu District, Shanxi; China
- Coordinates: 37.4476°N 112.5030°E
- Line: Datong–Xi'an Passenger Railway
- Platforms: 2

History
- Opened: 1 July 2014; 12 years ago
Location

The Taigu West railway station (Chinese: 太谷西站) is a railway station of Datong–Xi'an Passenger Railway that is located in Taigu District, Shanxi, China. It started operation on 1 July 2014, together with the railway.

Preceding station	China Railway High-speed	Following station
Jinzhong towards Datong South	Datong–Xi'an high-speed railway	Qixian East towards Xi'an North
