= Liaocheng railway station =

Railway station in Jining, Shandong

Liaocheng 聊城
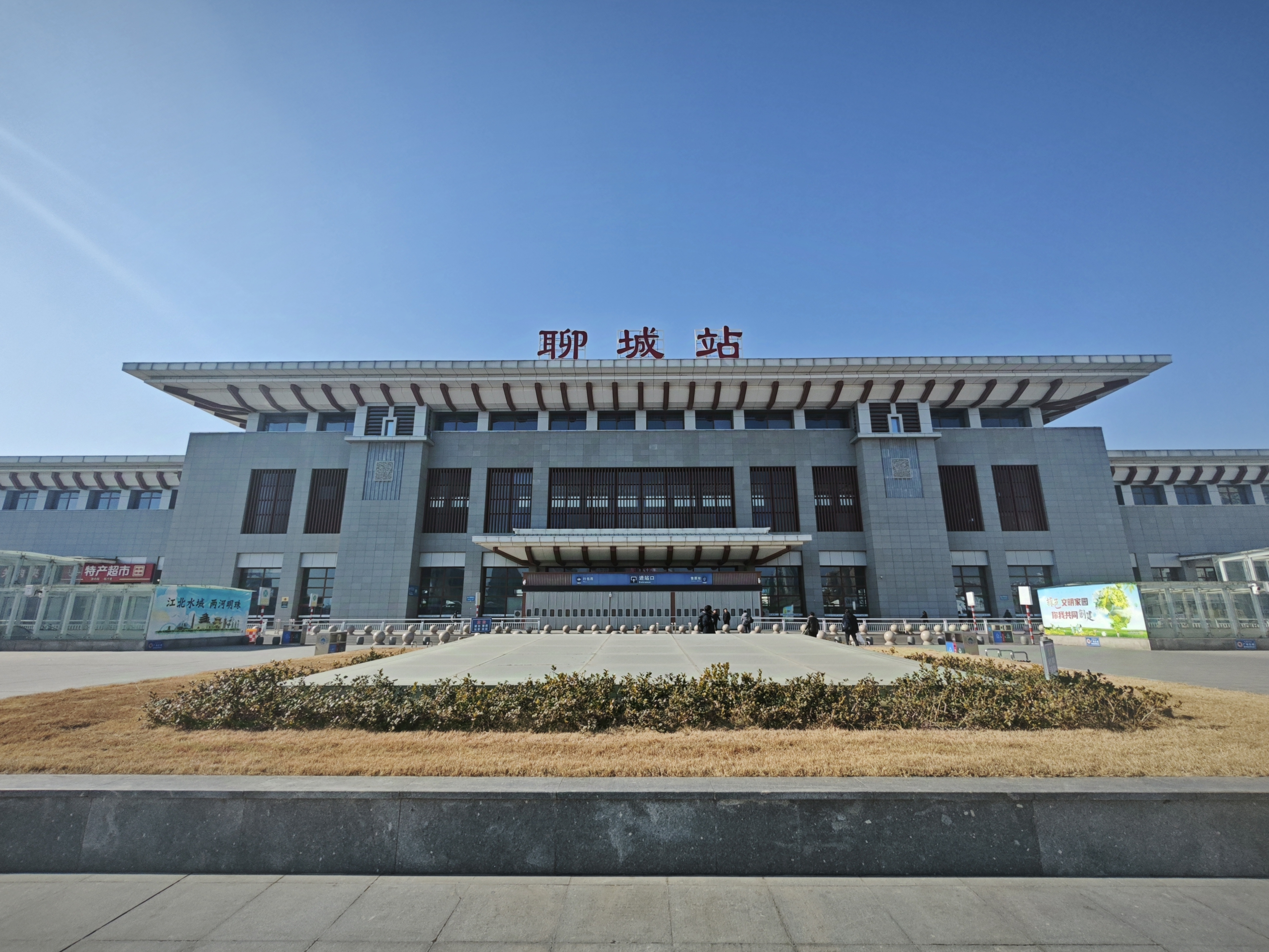

General information
- Location: Dongchangfu District, Liaocheng, Shandong; China
- Coordinates: 36°27′26″N 115°56′17″E
- Line(s): Beijing–Kowloon railway

History
- Opened: 1996

Liaocheng railway station (Chinese: 聊城站) is a railway station in Dongchangfu District, Liaocheng, Shandong, China. It is an intermediate stop on the Beijing–Kowloon railway.

== History ==
The station opened in 1996. At opening, there was around seven trains in each direction per day. By 2009, this had increased to around 31.

On 9 January 2012, a new station building was opened.

In 2016, the service level was around 54 trains in each direction per day.

== See also ==
- Liaocheng West railway station

Preceding station	China Railway	Following station
Linqing towards Beijing West	Beijing–Kowloon railway	Yanggu towards Hung Hom
