= Jinzhong railway station =

Railway station in Jinzhong, China

Jinzhong 晋中站
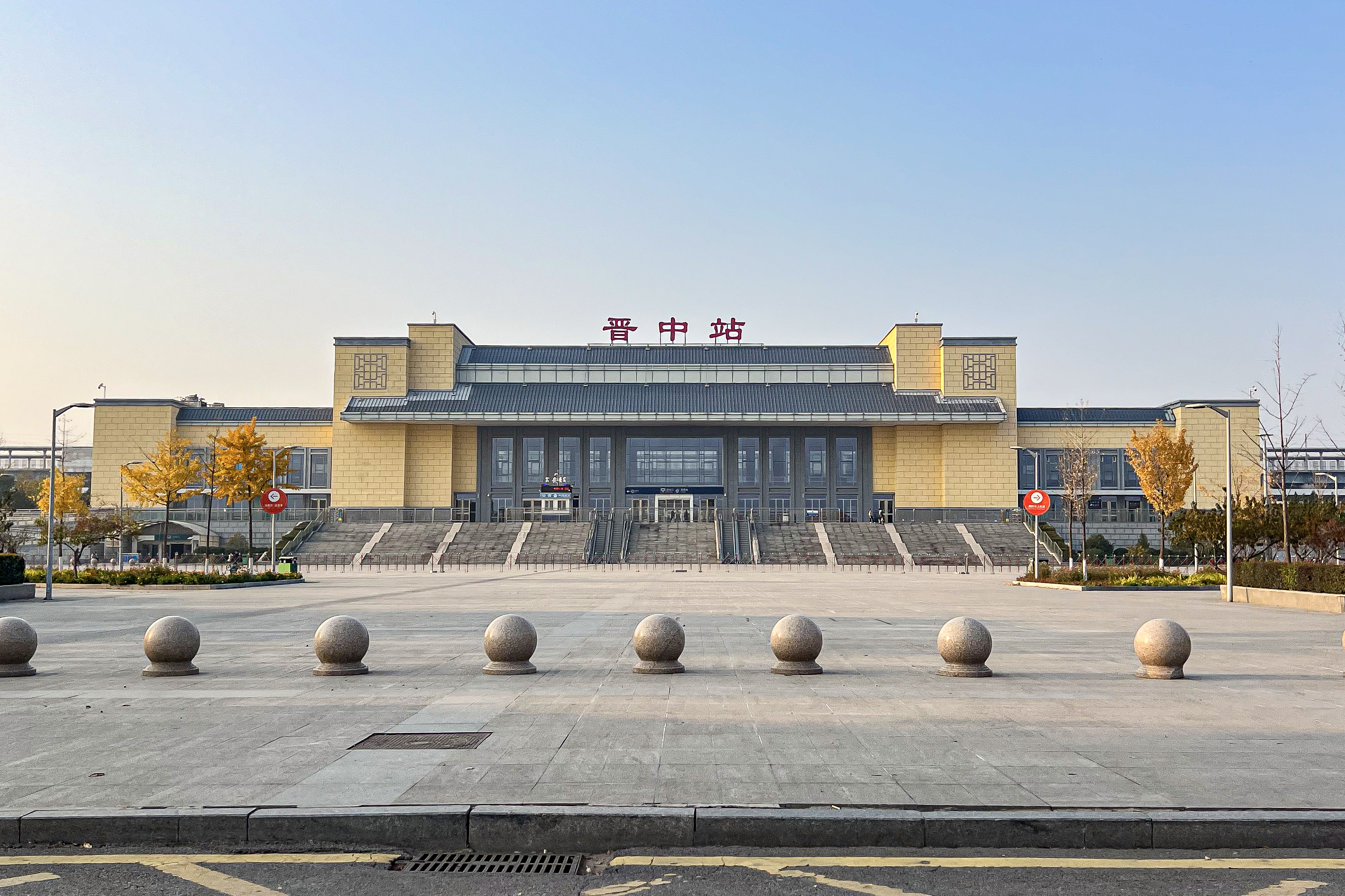

General information
- Location: Jinzhong, Shanxi; China
- Operator: China Railway
- Lines: Datong–Xi'an high-speed railway; Taiyuan–Jiaozuo high-speed railway

Other information
- Station code: 26473

History
- Opened: 1 July 2014; 12 years ago

Services
Preceding station	China Railway High-speed	Following station
Taiyuan South Terminus	Taiyuan–Jiaozuo high-speed railway	Taigu East towards Jiaozuo
Taiyuan South towards Datong South	Datong–Xi'an high-speed railway	Taigu West towards Xi'an North
Location

Jinzhong railway station (Chinese: 晋中站) is a railway station on the Datong–Xi'an high-speed railway and the Taiyuan–Jiaozuo high-speed railway that is located in Jinzhong, Shanxi, China. It started operation on 1 July 2014, together with the Railway.

== See also ==
- Zhongdingwuliuyuan railway station, a freight station near the Jinzhong railway station.

Preceding station	China Railway High-speed	Following station
Taiyuan South towards Datong South	Datong–Xi'an high-speed railway	Taigu West towards Xi'an North
Taiyuan South Terminus	Taiyuan–Jiaozuo high-speed railway	Taigu East towards Jiaozuo
