= Liaocheng West railway station =

Railway station in Liaocheng, China

Liaocheng West 聊城西

General information
- Location: Liaocheng, Shandong; China
- Lines: Beijing–Hong Kong high-speed railway; Zhengzhou–Jinan high-speed railway; Liaocheng–Handan–Changzhi high-speed railway (planned)

Other information
- Station code: VXK (China Railway commercial code); LCX (Pinyin code)

History
- Opened: December 8, 2023
Location

Liaocheng West railway station (Chinese: 聊城西站) is a railway station located in Liaocheng, Shandong, China.

== Planned lines ==
The station will be the eastern terminus of the planned Liaocheng–Handan–Changzhi high-speed railway.

== See also ==
- Liaocheng railway station
