= Taiyuan–Jiaozuo high-speed railway =

High speed rail line in China

Taiyuan–Jiaozuo high-speed railway 太焦高速铁路

Overview
- Status: Operating
- Termini: Taiyuan South; Jiaozuo

Service
- Operator(s): China Railway High-speed

History
- Opened: 12 December 2020; 5 years ago

Technical
- Line length: 428.9 km (267 mi)
- Track gauge: 1,435 mm (4 ft 8 1/2 in)
- Operating speed: 250 km/h (155 mph)

The Taiyuan–Jiaozuo high speed railway is a high-speed railway in China. The travel time between Taiyuan and Zhengzhou is expected to be reduced to two hours. The line connects to the Zhengzhou–Jiaozuo intercity railway at its southern end.

== History ==
Trial operations began in November 2020. The line opened on 12 December 2020.

== Stations ==
The line has the following stations:

- Taiyuan South
- Jinzhong
- Taigu East
- Yushe West
- Wuxiang
- Xiangyuan East
- Changzhi East
- Changzhi South
- Gaoping East
- Jincheng East
- Jiaozuo West
- Jiaozuo

== See also ==
- Taiyuan–Jiaozuo railway
