= Taiyuan–Xingxian railway =

Railway line in Shanxi, China

Overview
- Other name(s): 太兴铁路
- Status: Operating

History
- Opened: 30 December 2014

Technical
- Line length: 164.26 kilometres (102.07 mi)

The Taiyuan–Xingxian railway (Chinese: 太兴铁路) is a railway line in Shanxi, China.

== History ==
Work on the line began in July 2009. In 2014, reports were published about poor quality earthworks along the line. It opened on 30 December 2014.

On 21 May 2018, passenger services were introduced on the line.

== Route ==
The line is 164.26 kilometres (102.07 mi) long.
