= Taiyuan Metro =

Rapid transit system in Shanxi, China

Overview
- Locale: Taiyuan, Shanxi, China
- Transit type: Rapid transit
- Number of lines: 2
- Number of stations: 47
- Daily ridership: 599,500 (highest record in 31 December 2025)
- Website: www.tymetro.ltd

Operation
- Began operation: 26 December 2020; 5 years ago

Technical
- System length: 52.38 km (32.55 mi)
System map

The Taiyuan Metro is a rapid transit system in Taiyuan, capital of Shanxi province, China. The system opened with Line 2 on 26 December 2020. Line 1 opened on 22 February 2025.

== History ==
The Taiyuan Metro project was launched in September 2009 with the establishment of the Taiyuan Metro Preparation Office. The office drafted the construction proposal and network plan, which upon approval by the Taiyuan city government, were submitted to the central government for approval.

The National Development and Reform Commission approved the first phase of the proposal (2012−18) on 5 September 2012, and construction of Line 2 began on 2 November 2013.

== Lines in Operation ==
Line	Terminals		Operational	Last extension	Length km	Stations
1	Helongwan (Wanbailin)	Wusu 1Hao/2Hao Hangzhanlou (Xiaodian)	February 22. 2025	-	28.737	24
2	Jiancaoping (Jiancaoping)	Xiqiao (Xiaodian)	December 26, 2020	-	23.647	24

=== Line 1 ===
Line 1 runs between Helongwan to Wusu 1 Hao / 2 Hao Hangzhanlou at Taiyuan Wusu Airport, and passes high traffic areas such as Taiyuan West Bus Station, Taiyuan University of Technology, Danan Gate, Wuyi Square, Taiyuan Railway Station and Taiyuan South Railway Station. The line consists of 24 underground stations and 28.737 kilometres (17.856 mi) of track. Construction started on 30 December 2019. The line opened on 22 February 2025.

=== Line 2 ===
Line 2 was the first line to be built and opened on 26 December 2020. It crosses the main urban area of Taiyuan in a north–south direction. Construction began on 2 November 2013. The first phase consists of 23 stations and 23.647 kilometres (14.694 mi) of track between Xiqiao in the south and Jiancaoping in the north. The line uses 24 six-car Type A automated trains.

== Future Development ==
=== Short-term plan ===
Line 3 and the one-station extension of Line 1 are under planning and have not been approved by National Development and Reform Commission as of February 2025. Line 3 and the extension of Line 1 are planned to be completed around 2030.

=== Long-term plan ===
Six more lines are being planned. The network is expected to comprise seven lines with a total length of 233.6 kilometres (145.2 mi) when complete and 150 stations.

The entire network is scheduled to be built in three phases lasting 17 years. The first phase, consisting of Line 1 and Line 2, with a combined 49.2 kilometres (30.6 mi) of track, is to be built from 2013 to 2020. This phase is projected to cost 30.9 billion yuan to build, or 628 million yuan per kilometre.

During the second phase, Line 3, Line 4, and the second phase of Line 2 are expected to be completed, extending the network to 116.2 kilometres (72.2 mi). The rest of the network is planned to be built later, completing the 233.6-kilometre (145.2 mi) network.
