= Changzhi East railway station =

Railway station in Changzhi, Shanxi, China

Changzhi East 长治东
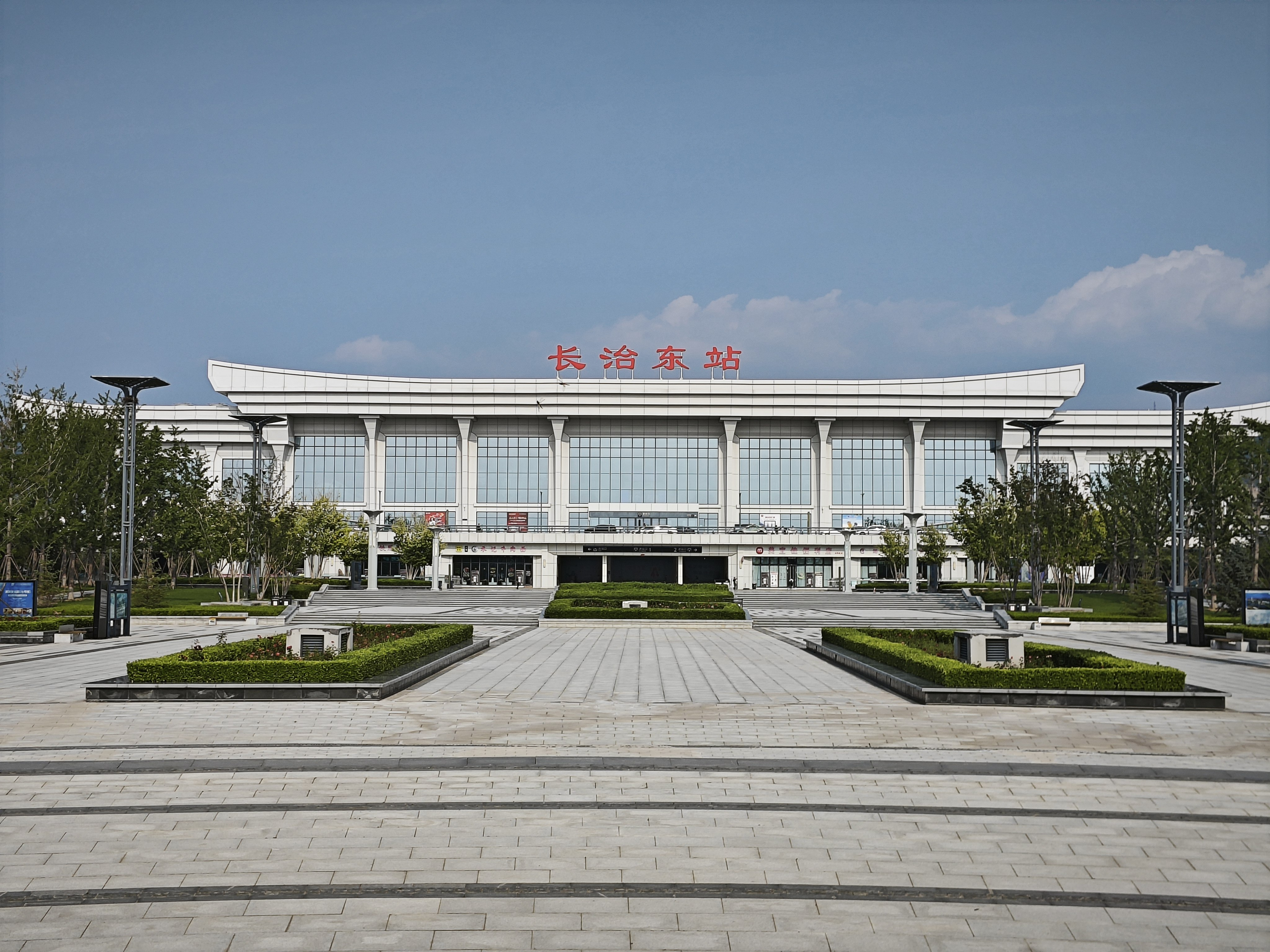
- Changzhidong railway station

General information
- Location: Luzhou District, Changzhi, Shanxi; China
- Coordinates: 36.228643°N 113.159829°E
- Lines: Taiyuan–Jiaozuo high-speed railway; Liaocheng–Handan–Changzhi high-speed railway (planned)

History
- Opened: 12 December 2020; 5 years ago

Services
Preceding station	China Railway High-speed	Following station
Xiangyuan East towards Taiyuan South	Taiyuan–Jiaozuo high-speed railway	Changzhi South towards Jiaozuo
Location

Changzhi East railway station (Chinese: 长治东站) is a railway station in Luzhou District, Changzhi, Shanxi, China.

Construction of the station began in June 2016. It opened with the Taiyuan–Jiaozuo high-speed railway on 12 December 2020. The station will be the western terminus of the planned Liaocheng–Handan–Changzhi high-speed railway.

== Gallery ==
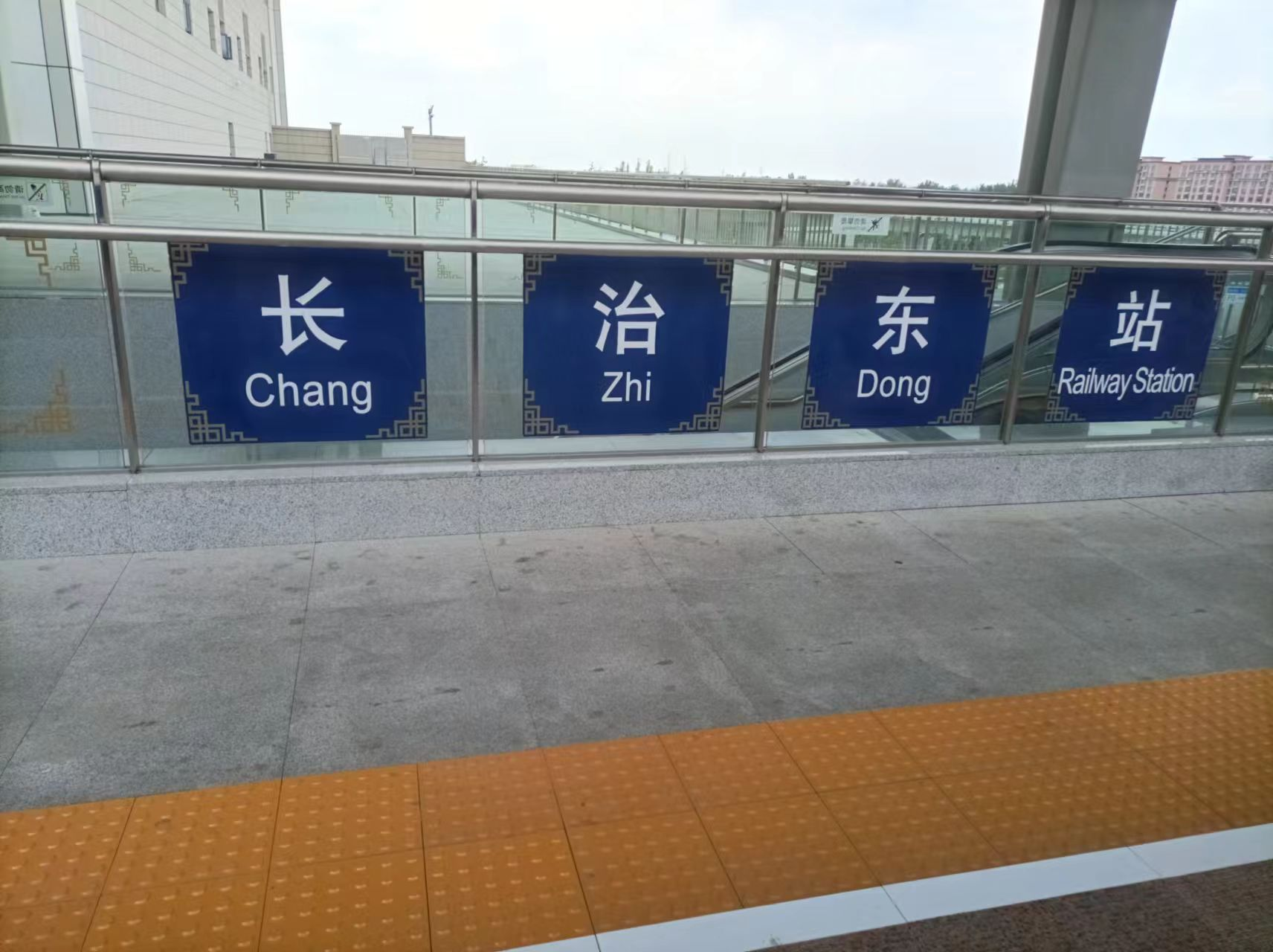
The station name on platform 1

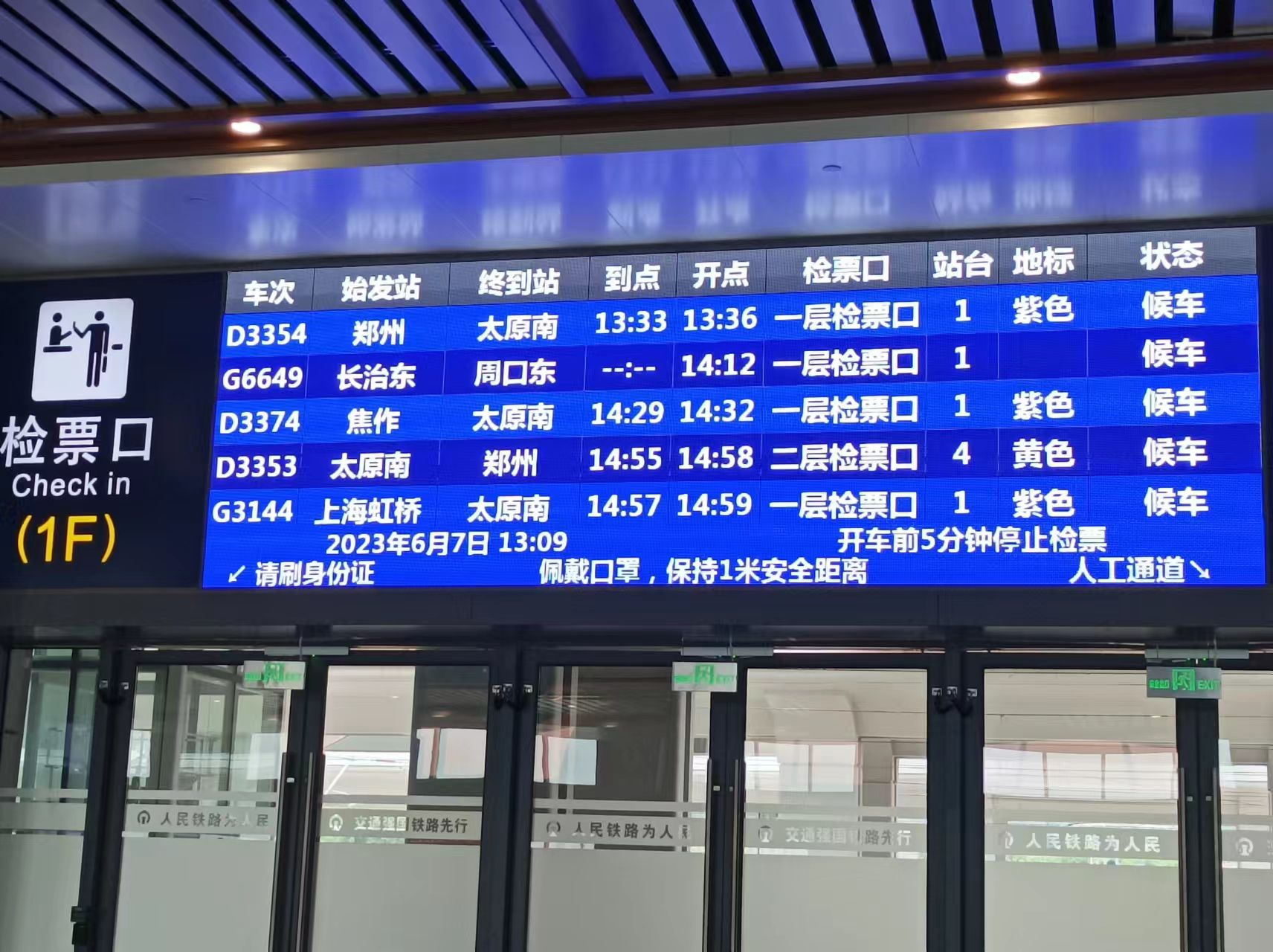
Departure timetable

A train entering platform 1
