= Yingze Street =

Street in Taiyuan, Shanxi, China

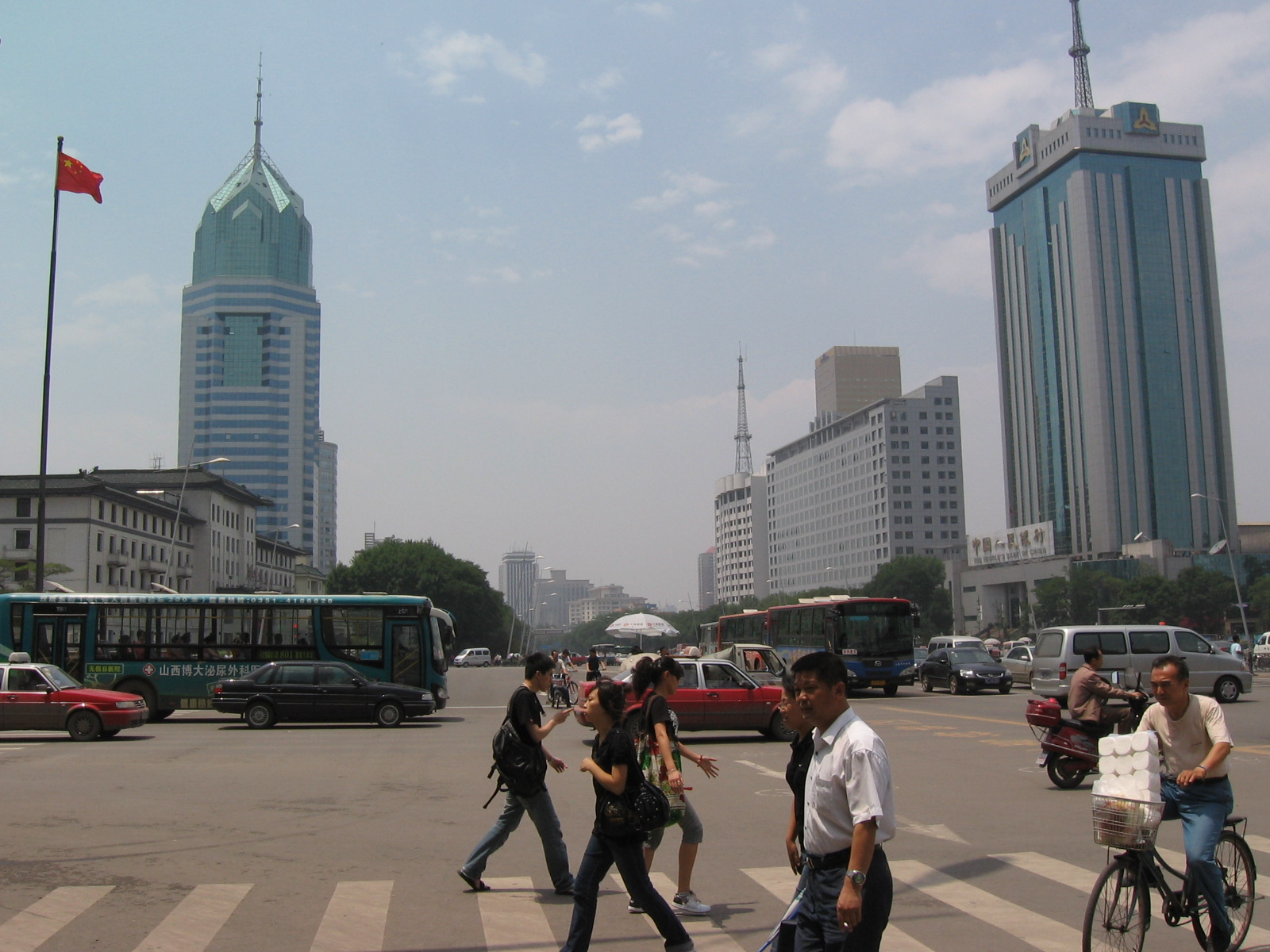
- Yingze Street, May I Square nearby

Route information
- Length: 7 mi (11 km)
- Existed: 1956–present

Major junctions
- East end: Taiyuan Railway Station
- West end: Nanhan Square

Location
- Country: China

Highway system
- Transport in China

Yingze Street (Chinese: 迎泽大街; pinyin: YÍngzé dàjiē) is one of the main streets which was first constructed in 1956 in Taiyuan, Shanxi, China. It is designed to be 70 metres in width and was second to Chang’an Avenue" in Beijing at that time. It won the title of "The No.2 Street in China", "Chang'an Avenue in Taiyuan" and "The No.1 Street in Three-Jin". Yingze Street went through four additional periods of construction. Currently, it has 14 two-way motor roads (including two public transportation lanes), and two bicycle lanes, 2 pavements and 2 green areas. Yingze Street begins at Taiyuan Railway Station in the east and extends westwards to Nanhan Square crossing Fen River. It runs 10 kilometers and the western part of Fen River is called Yingze West Street. Landmarks which are situated along the street include Taiyuan Railway Station, May First Square, Yingze Park, Taiyuan Workers Cultural Palace, Yingze Hotel, Bingzhou Restaurant, China Coal Museum, Taiyuan University of Technology. Although Yangze Street is no longer the widest street in Taiyuan, it remains one of the symbols of Taiyuan.

== Name ==
There is a common story about the origin of Yingze Street's name: Supposedly, the city of Taiyuan had built the street in the 1950s, in order to welcome Mao Zedong’s inspection visit, since "ying" means welcome, and "ze" would be short for "Zedong". Actually, Mao Zedong never visited Taiyuan in his whole life. A more trustworthy account is that: Great Southern Gate "Yingze Gate" (which was removed) of the old Taiyuan City was just located in Yingze Street, and the street derived its name from Yingze Gate. The name of Yingze Gate was itself derived from the marsh outside the gate, which was related to South Wind Ballad: "The elegant south wind not only can relieve people’s bitterness, but also can increase people’s wealth." Yingze gate is in the south of Taiyuan. It is named "Yingze", which means to greet the bounty of Nanfeng that helps people relieve their worry about hunger and poverty. Besides, Yingze Park, Yingze Bridge and Yingze District were all named after "Yingze". Yingze Gate was located in the south of Taiyuan, named as Yingze. It meant to greet the bounty of NanFeng and help people relieve their worry about hungry and poverty.

== Original establishment ==
In the 1950s, the mayor, Yue Weifan, of Taiyuan made a plan for the first city planning of Taiyuan after 1949. In the plan, Yingze Street was the most attractive part of the city plan. The planned Yingze Street is built on a dirt road, which was located in the south outside Taiyuan City. The designed width of Yingze Street was 70 meters, which aroused great dispute and this plan was criticized as "crave for things big and foreign" during the North China Bureau Meeting. At the beginning of the fifties, most streets in Taiyuan were only about 6 or 7 meters in width. The width of 70 meters was wide enough for 4000 cars passing on the street at the same time. However, there were only 800 cars in total in Taiyuan at that time. Facing the dispute, Yue Weifan advocated the conception of "Don't fall behind in 50 years, or you'll regret it in 100 years" on city construction and focused on the long-term development. Eventually, Yue Weifan overcame all objections and the construction of Yingze Street began in 1956. One year later, the first-stage construction was finished from the east of May 1 square to the west of Yingze Bridge. Because certain surrounding buildings could not be demolished, the final phase of construction resulted in a street width of 66 meters.

== Expansion ==
In 1976, the second-stage of the Yingze Street construction started. After two years’ construction, the eastern part of Yingze street started from May I square to Taiyuan Railway Station (which was called "Yingze East Street " at that time). In 1985, the shortcut of Yingze West Street was started. One year later, Yingze East Street extended to Xiayuan (which was called Yingze West Street). In 1996, the cut-off of Yingze West Street extended to Nanhan Square in the west in the same year. In 2007, Yingze Street started the first expansion and reconstruction and it built the microcirculation road to ease the traffic pressure caused by vehicles of the surrounding roads.
