= Jiancaoping, Taiyuan =

Coordinates: 37°56′40″N 112°28′57″E

Jiancaoping 尖草坪区
- District
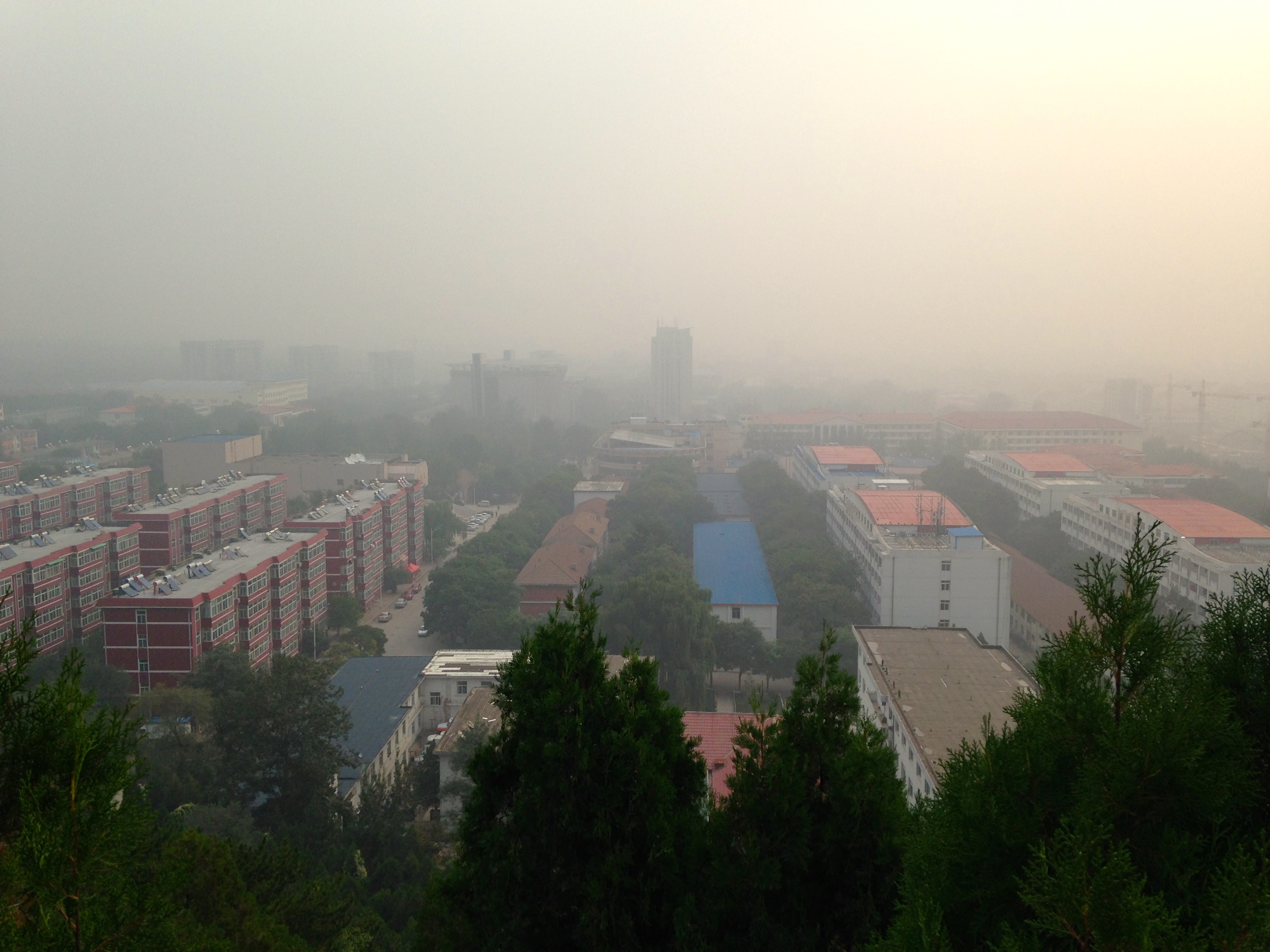

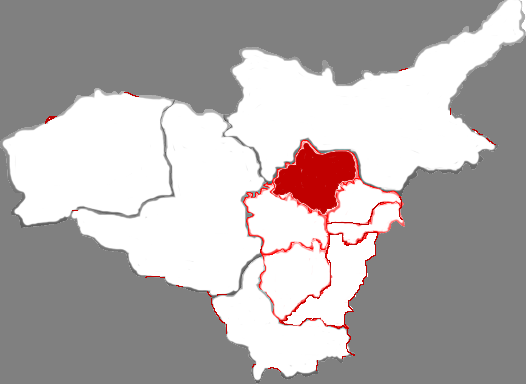
- Location in Taiyuan

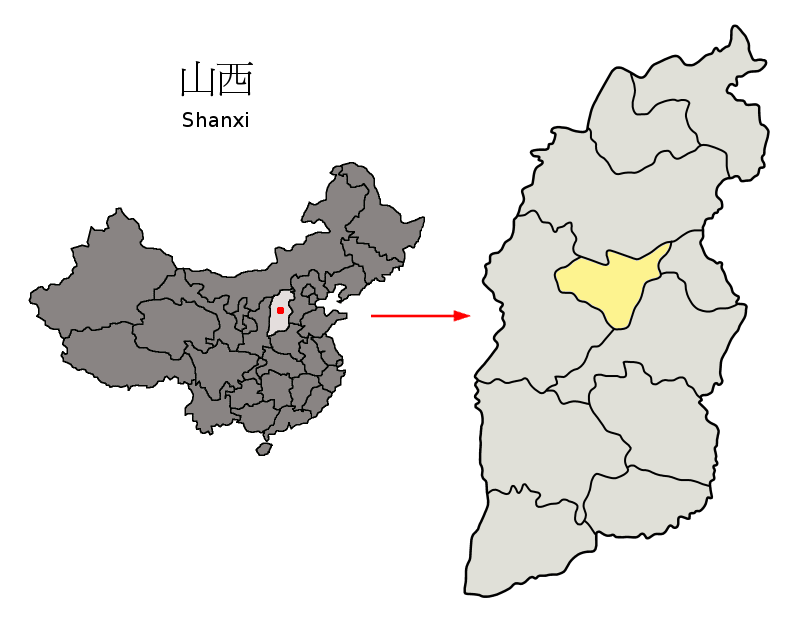
- Taiyuan in Shanxi
- Country: People's Republic of China
- Province: Shanxi
- Prefecture-level city: Taiyuan

Area
  - Total: 296 km^{2} (114 sq mi)

Population (2020)
  - Total: 530,499
  - Density: 1,790/km^{2} (4,640/sq mi)
- Time zone: UTC+8 (China Standard)
- Website: www.tyjcp.gov.cn

Jiancaoping District (Chinese: 尖草坪区; pinyin: Jiāncǎopíng Qū) is one of six districts of the prefecture-level city of Taiyuan, the capital of Shanxi Province, in the north of China.
