= Taiyuan South railway station =

Railway station in Shanxi, China

Taiyuan South 太原南
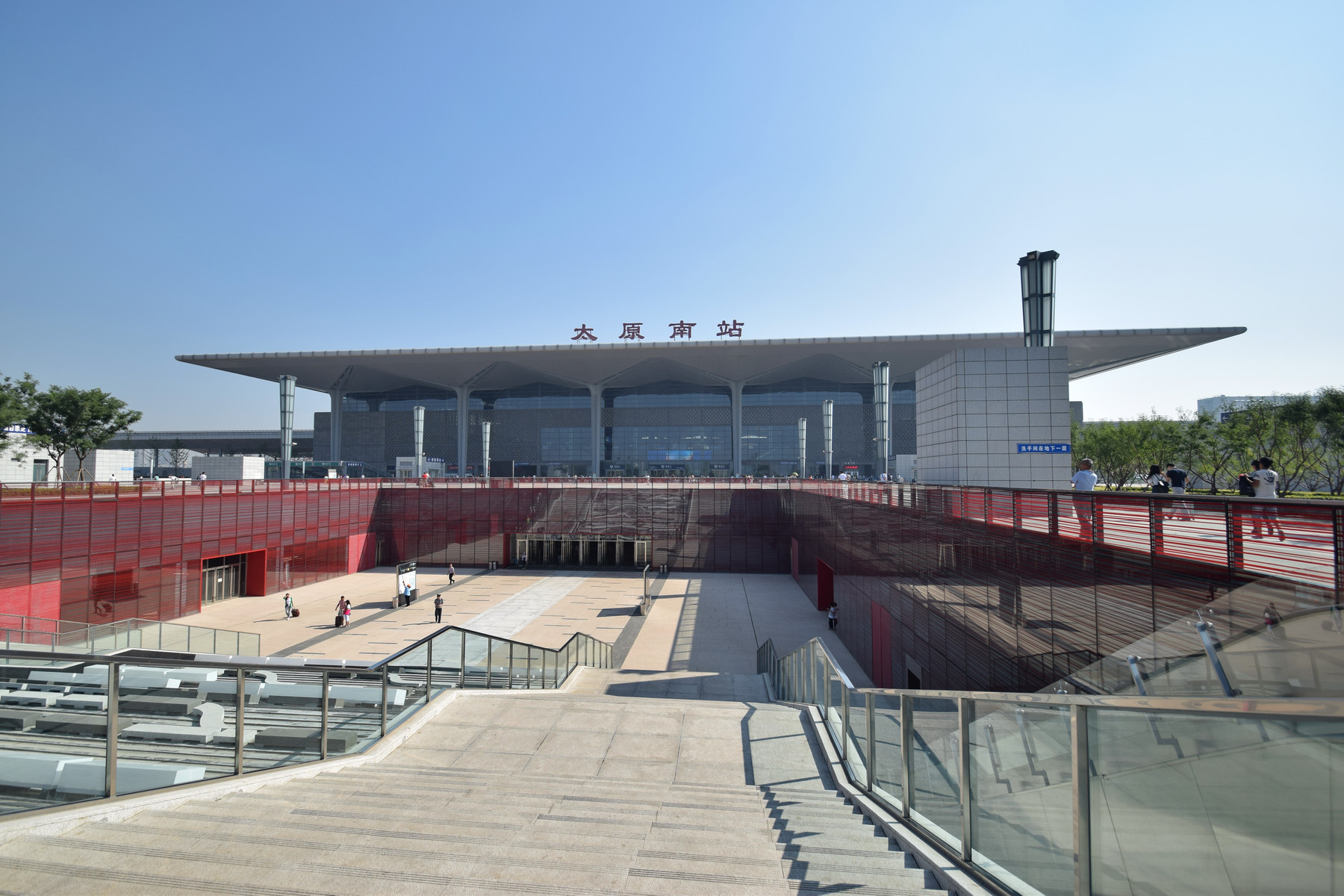

General information
- Other names: Taiyuannan
- Location: Beiying North Road; Xiaodian District, Taiyuan, Shanxi Province; China
- Coordinates: 37°47′26.9″N 112°36′15.4″E
- Lines: Datong–Xi'an Passenger Railway; Taiyuan–Jiaozuo high-speed railway

Other information
- Station code: TMIS code: 26468; Telegraph code: TNV; Pinyin code: TYN
- Classification: Top Class station

History
- Opened: 1 July 2014; 11 years ago

Services
| Preceding station | China Railway High-speed | Following station |
|---|---|---|
| Terminus | Taiyuan–Jiaozuo high-speed railway | Jinzhong towards Jiaozuo |
| Taiyuan towards Datong South | Datong–Xi'an high-speed railway | Jinzhong towards Xi'an North |
Location

Taiyuannan (Taiyuan South) railway station (Chinese: 太原南站; pinyin: Tàiyuán Nán zhàn) is a railway station in Xiaodian District, Taiyuan, Shanxi, China. It opened on 1 July 2014, together with the Datong–Xi'an Passenger Railway.

== Metro station ==
Taiyuannanzhan 太原南站
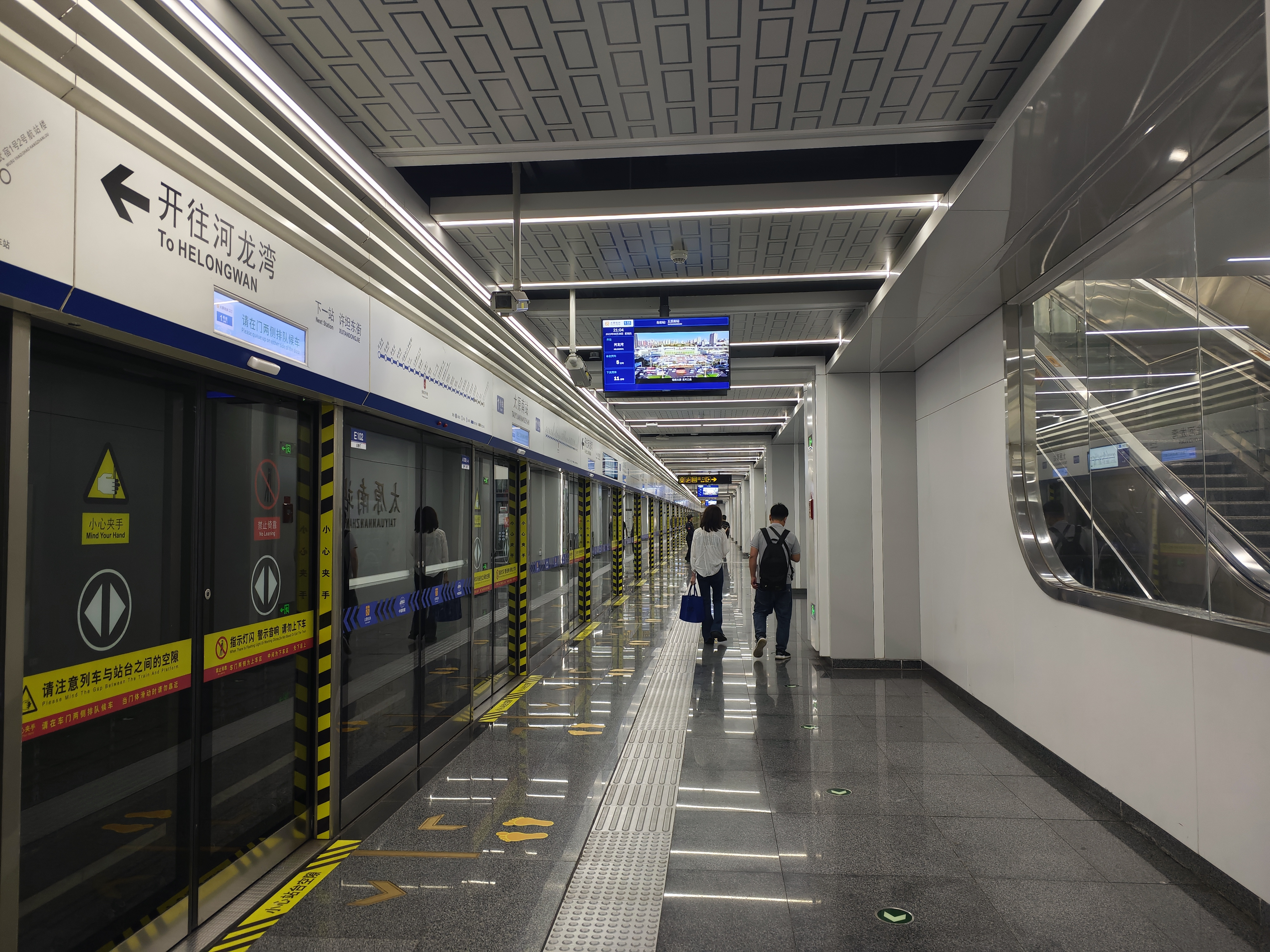
- Platform

General information
- Location: East square, Taiyuan South railway station Xiaodian District, Taiyuan, Shanxi Province; China
- System: Taiyuan Metro
- Line: Line 1
- Platforms: 2 (1 island platform)
- Connections: Taiyuan South

Construction
- Structure type: Underground

History
- Opened: 22 February 2025

Services
| Preceding station | Taiyuan Metro | Following station |
|---|---|---|
| Xutandongjie towards Helongwan | Line 1 | Beiying towards Wusu 1Hao/2Hao Hangzhanlou |
Location

The metro station of Taiyuan South railway station is called Taiyuannanzhan (Chinese: 太原南站; lit. 'Taiyuan South Railway Station') on Line 1 of the Taiyuan Metro in China. It is located in the Xiaodian District of Taiyuan, under the east square of railway station.

=== Station layout ===
Taiyuannanzhan has two levels: a concourse, and an island platform with two tracks for line 1.

=== Entrances/exits ===
Taiyuannanzhan has two exits with labels. On the concourse level, there are 2 exits for the railway arrival lobby and the parking lot of railway station without labels.

- A: Beiying North Road (west)
- B: Beiying North Road (west)

== See also ==
- Taiyuan railway station
