= Xiaodian, Taiyuan =

Coordinates: 37°44′39″N 112°33′21″E

Xiaodian 小店区
- District
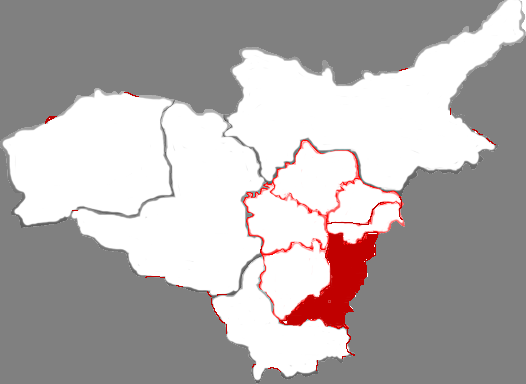
- Location in Taiyuan

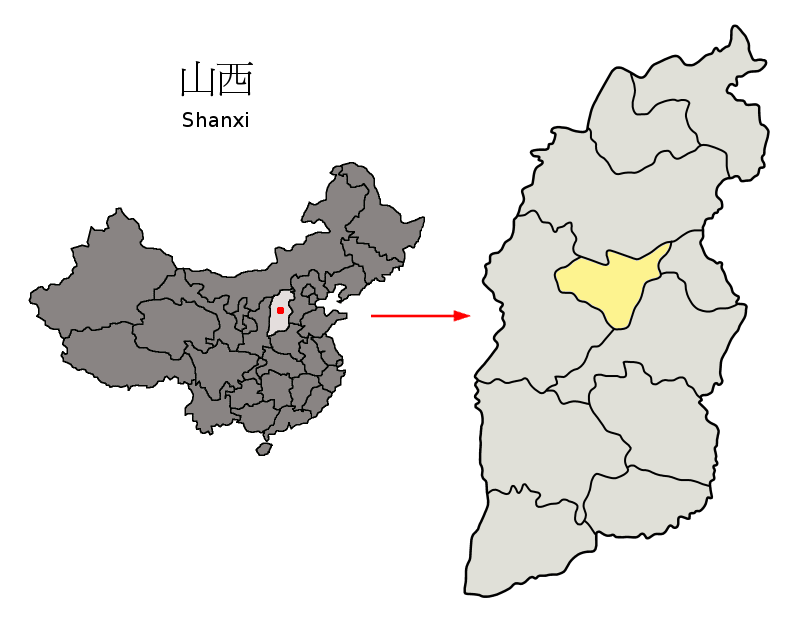
- Taiyuan in Shanxi
- Country: People's Republic of China
- Province: Shanxi
- Prefecture-level city: Taiyuan

Area
  - Total: 289.94 km^{2} (111.95 sq mi)

Population (2020)
  - Total: 1,357,242
  - Density: 3,931/km^{2} (10,180/sq mi)
- Time zone: UTC+8 (China Standard)
- Website: www.tyxd.gov.cn

Xiaodian District (Chinese: 小店区; pinyin: Xiǎodiàn Qū) is one of six districts of the prefecture-level city of Taiyuan, the capital of Shanxi Province, North China. It was established in 1998 during a boundary reorganization, formed from select townships and sub-districts of the former Nanjiao District and Nancheng District. It covers a total area of 295 square kilometers.

== History ==
On May 8, 1997, the administrative division adjustment plan for the districts under the jurisdiction of Taiyuan City received official approval from the State Council of China. Under this plan, the newly established Xiaodian District was constituted by three subdistricts—Wucheng, Beiying, and Shuangta—formerly belonging to Nancheng District; six townships—Qinxian, Huangling, Xiaodian, Xiwenzhuang, Liujiabao, and Beige—formerly belonging to Nanjiao District; and Dicun Natural Village, also formerly of Nanjiao District's Haozhuang Township. The district government is situated on Changsheng West Street in Xiaodian Town, at the former site of Nanjiao District government.

On January 1, 1998, Xiaodian District was officially inaugurated.

On December 2, 2002, the Taiyuan Municipal Government transferred Yinjiapu Village (under Pingyang Road Subdistrict, Xiaodian District) and Xiaoma Village (under Xiaodian Subdistrict) to the Taiyuan High-tech Industrial Development Zone; concurrently, Chengxi, Xiazhuang, and Getaying Villages (under Xiaodian Subdistrict), along with Yangzhuang, Huazhangbao, Nanpan, and Nanheiyao Villages (under Xiwenzhuang Township), were transferred to the Taiyuan Economic and Technical Development Zone.

From 2018 to 2023, the district was consistently ranked among the top 100 districts nationwide in terms of comprehensive strength, with its standing climbing to the 61st position.
