= Yingze, Taiyuan =

Coordinates: 37°53′41″N 112°34′03″E

Yingze 迎泽区
- District
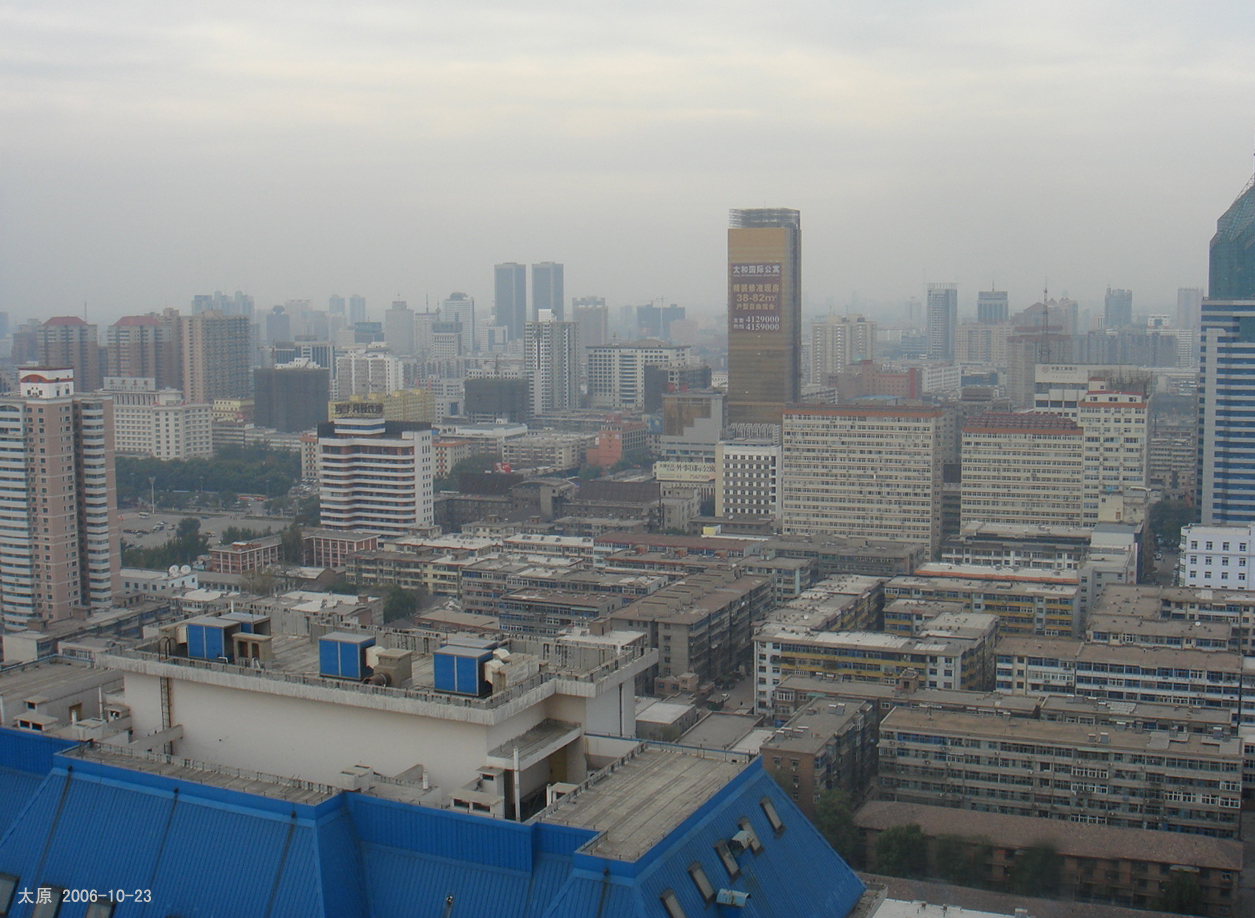

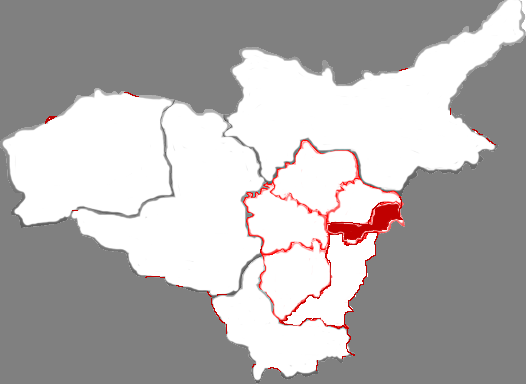
- Location in Taiyuan

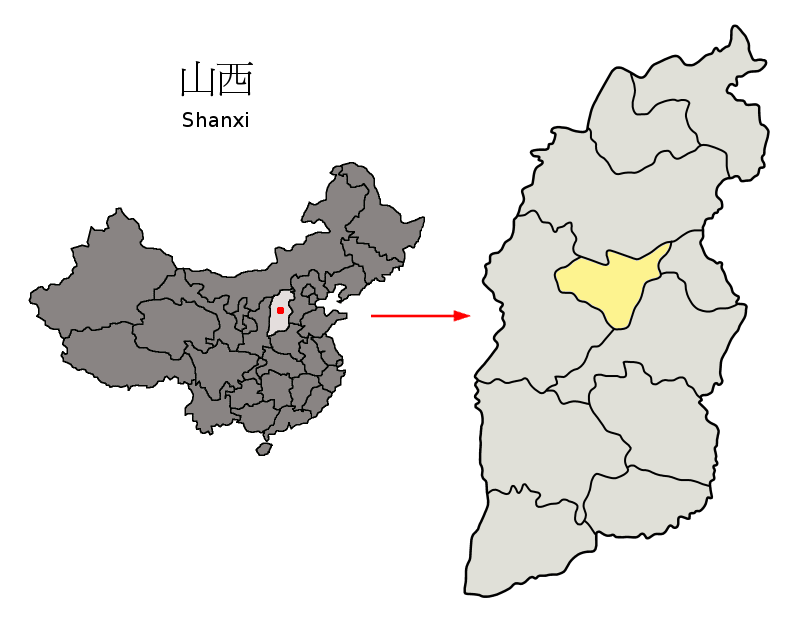
- Taiyuan in Shanxi
- Country: People's Republic of China
- Province: Shanxi
- Prefecture-level city: Taiyuan

Population (2020)
  - Total: 594,238
- Time zone: UTC+8 (China Standard)
- Website: www.yingze.gov.cn

Yingze District (simplified Chinese: 迎泽区; traditional Chinese: 迎澤區; pinyin: Yíngzé Qū) is one of six districts of the prefecture-level city of Taiyuan, the capital of Shanxi Province, North China.
