= Shanxi =

Province in North China

Shanxi 山西 Shansi
- Province
- Province of Shanxi

Name transcription(s)
  - Chinese: 山西省 (Shānxī shěng)
  - Abbreviation: SX / 晋 (Jìn)
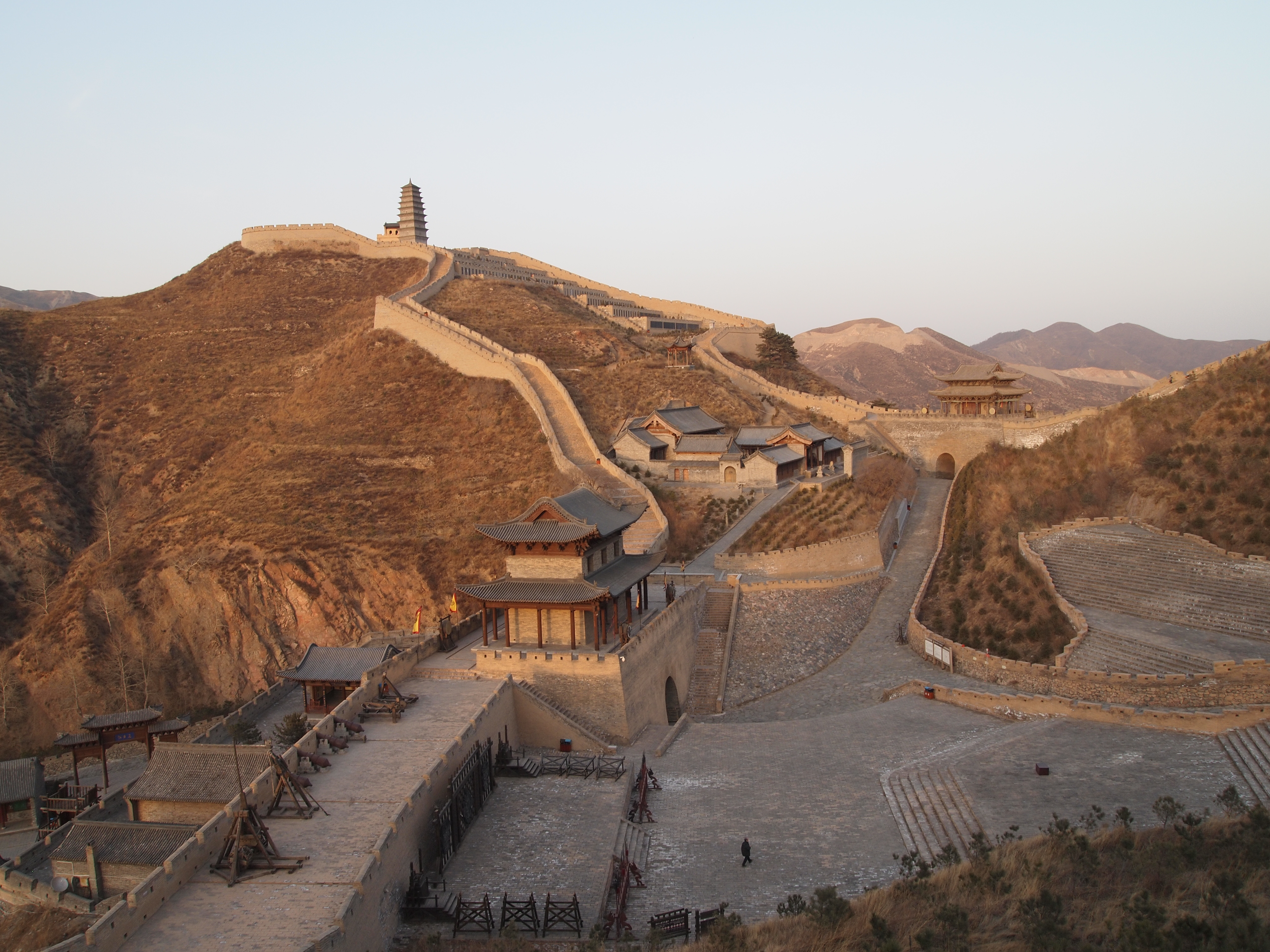
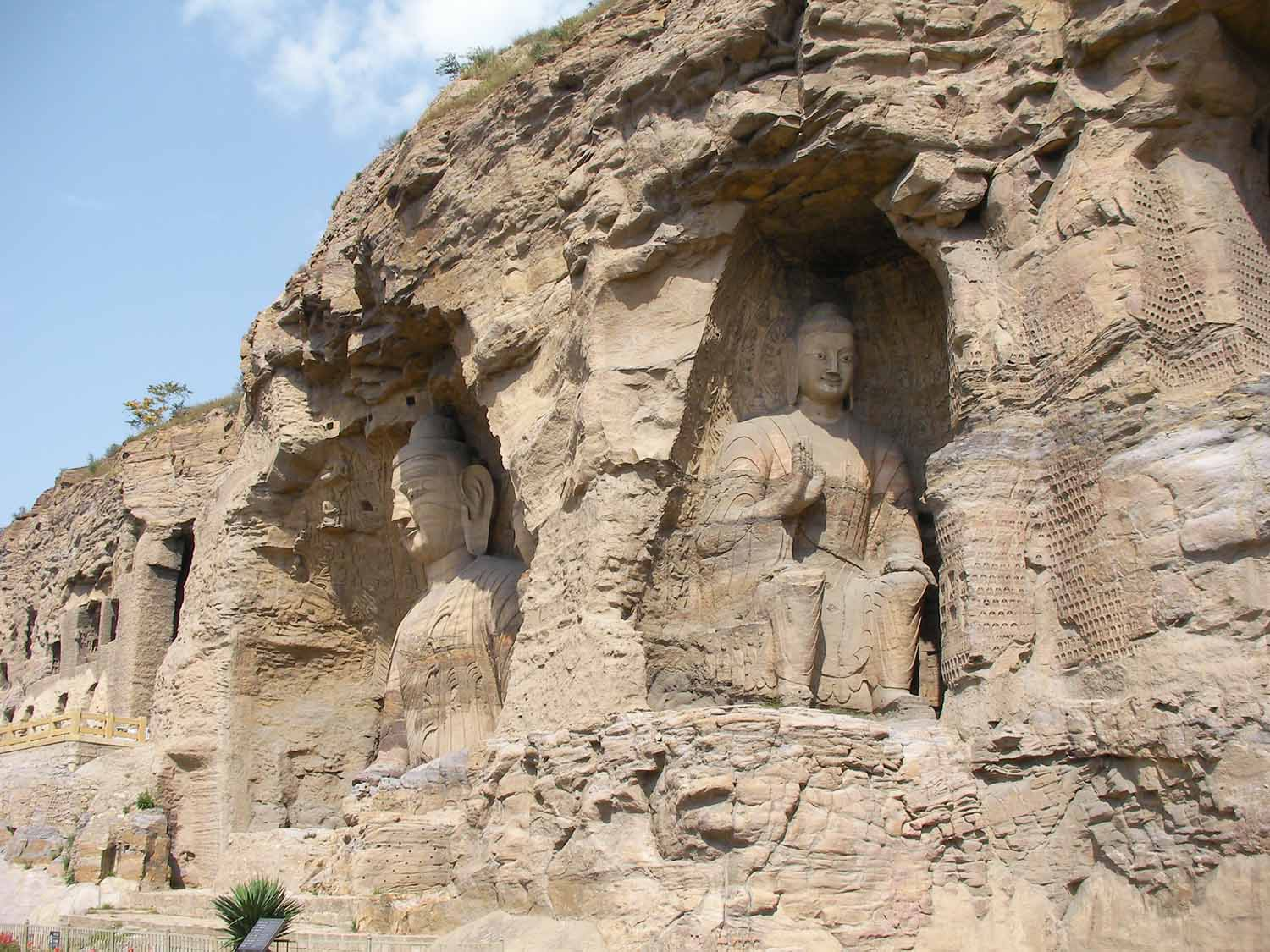
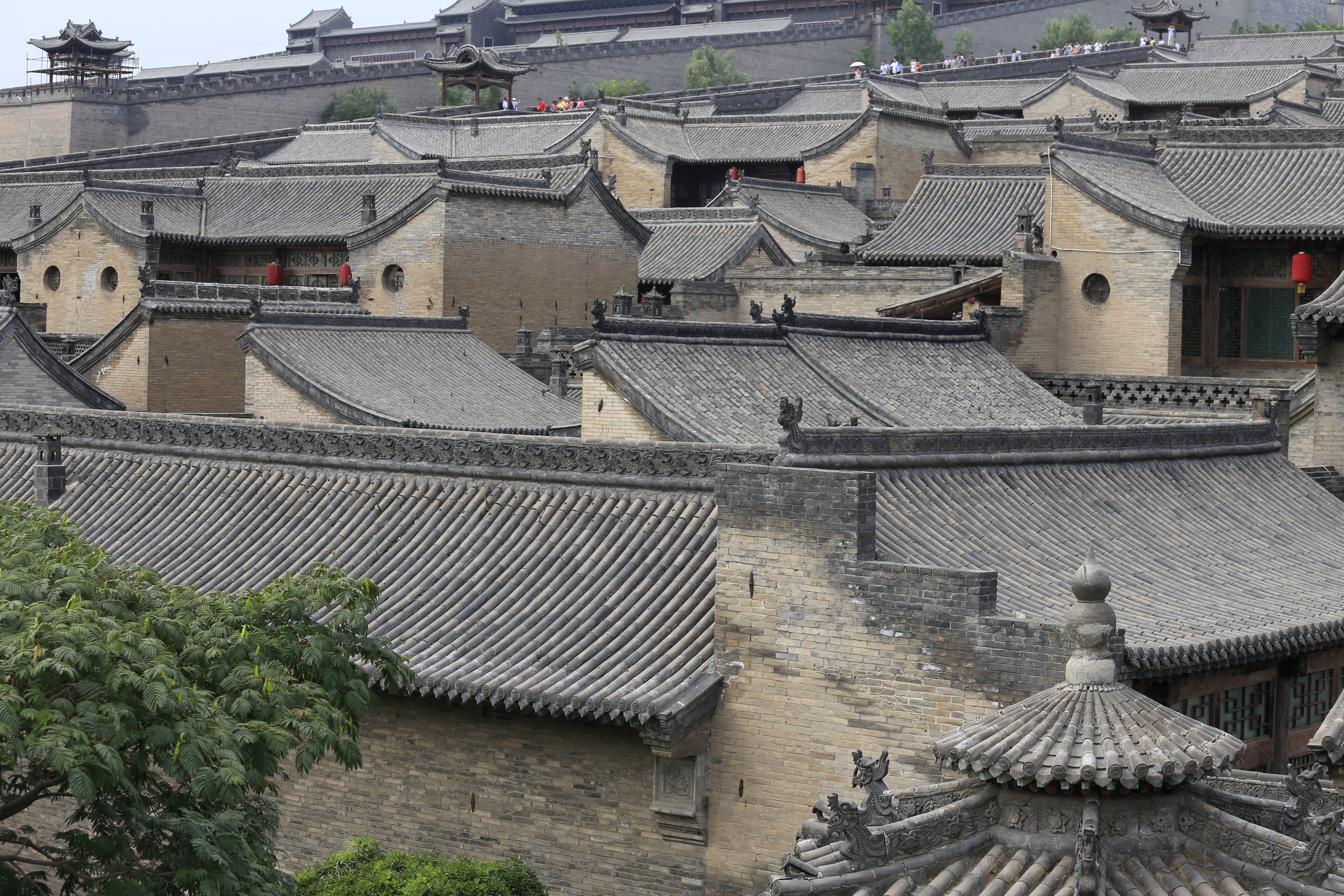
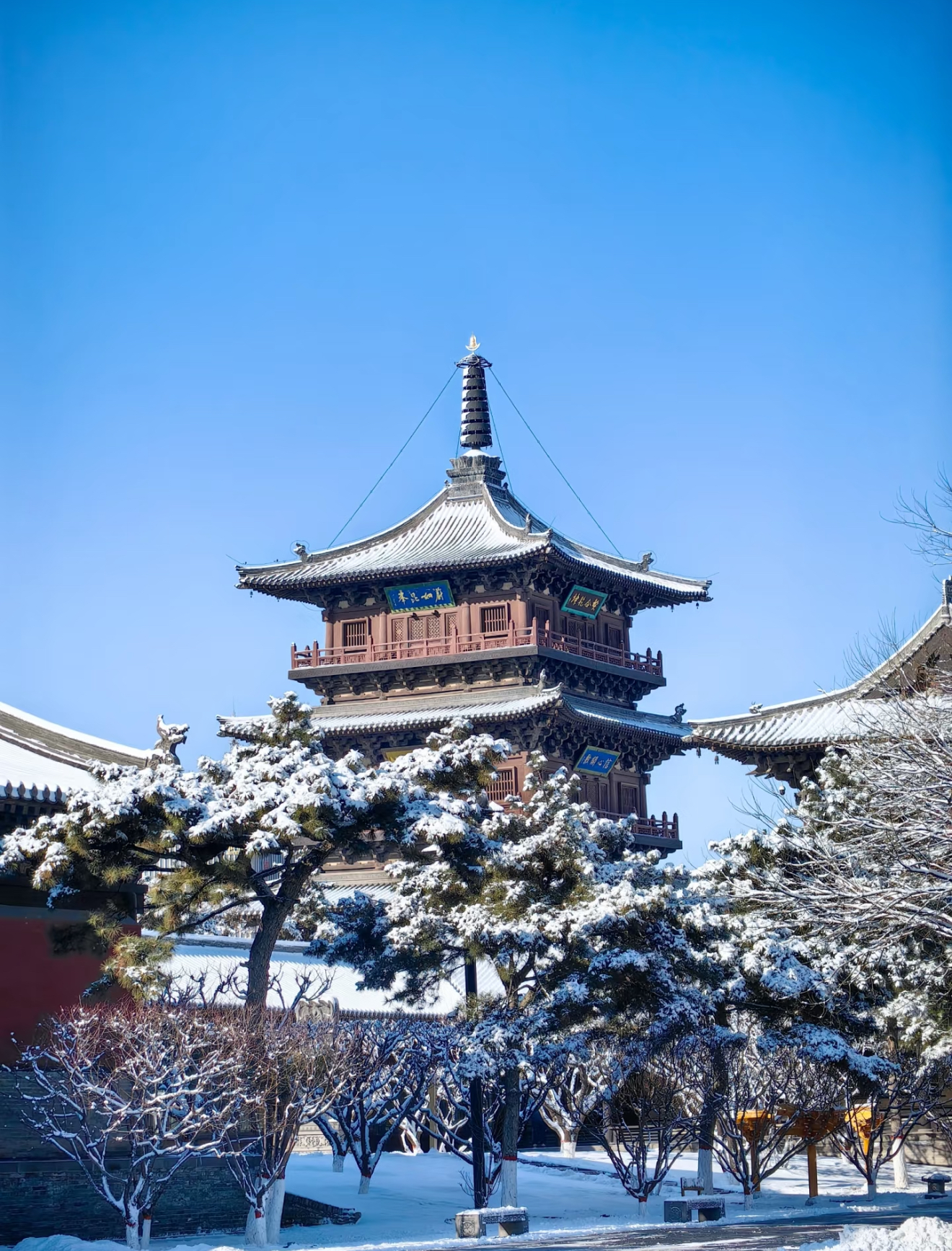
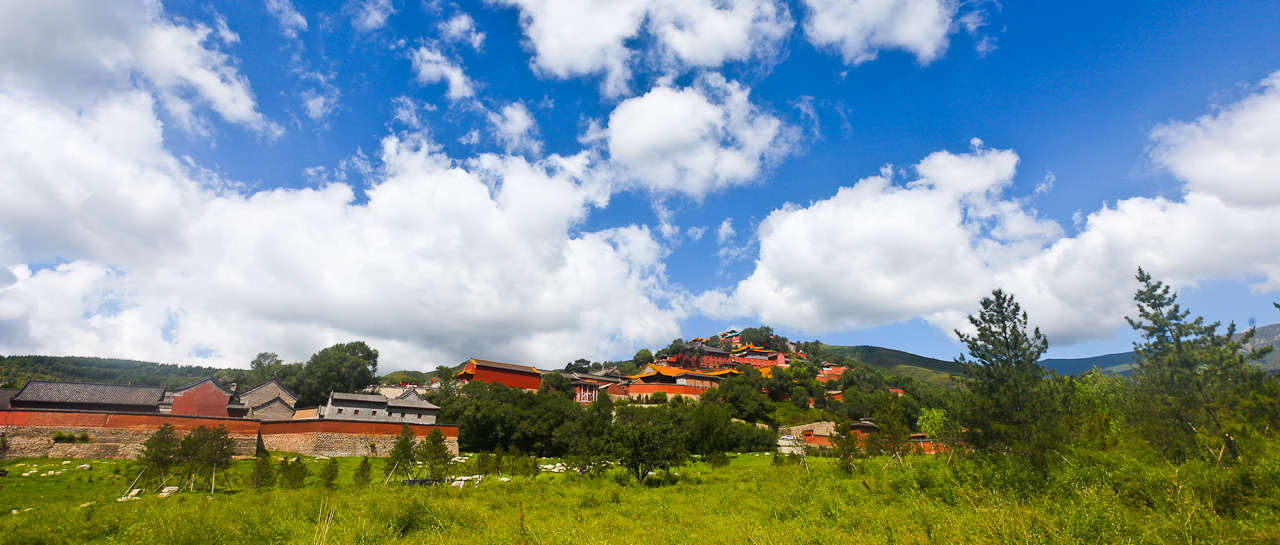
- Yanmen Pass Yungang Grottoes Wang Family Compound Pagoda at Huayan Temple Wutai Mountain

- Location of Shanxi in China
- Coordinates: 37°42′N 112°24′E
- Country: China
- Named for: 山, shān – mountain; 西, xī – west; "west of the Taihang Mountains"
- Capital (and largest city): Taiyuan
- Divisions: 11 prefectures, 119 counties, 1388 townships

Government
  - Type: Province
  - Body: Shanxi Provincial People's Congress
  - Party Secretary: Tang Dengjie
  - Congress chairman: Tang Dengjie
  - Governor: Lu Dongliang
  - CPPCC chairman: Zhang Chunlin
  - National People's Congress Representation: 68 deputies

Area
  - Total: 156,000 km^{2} (60,000 sq mi)
  - Rank: 19th
- Highest elevation (Mount Wutai): 3,058 m (10,033 ft)

Population (2020)
  - Total: 34,915,616
  - Rank: 18th
  - Density: 224/km^{2} (580/sq mi)
  - Rank: 19th

Demographics
  - Ethnic composition: Han – 99.7%; Hui – 0.2%
  - Languages and dialects: Jin; Central Plains Mandarin; Jilu Mandarin

GDP (2023)
  - Total: CN¥2,570 billion (20th; US$365 billion)
  - Per capita: CN¥73,984 (15th; US$10,499)
- ISO 3166 code: CN-SX
- HDI (2023): 0.800 (13th) – very high
- Website: www.shanxigov.cn

Shanxi
- "Shanxi" in Chinese characters
- Chinese: 山西
- Postal: Shansi
- Literal meaning: "West of the (Taihang) Mountains"
Transcriptions
Standard Mandarin
- Hanyu Pinyin: Shānxī
- Bopomofo: ㄕㄢ ㄒㄧ
- Wade–Giles: Shan^{1}-hsi^{1}
- IPA: [ʂánɕí]
other Mandarin
- Xiao'erjing: شًاثِ
Wu
- Suzhounese: Se^{1}-si^{1}
Yue: Cantonese
- Yale Romanization: Sāan-sāi
- Jyutping: Saan1-sai1
Southern Min
- Hokkien POJ: Soaⁿ-sai
- Tâi-lô: Suann-sai

Shanxi (Note: Chinese: 山西; formerly romanised as Shansi) is a province in North China. Its capital and largest city is Taiyuan, and its next most populated prefecture-level cities are Changzhi and Datong.

The province's one-character abbreviation is 晋 (Jìn), after the state of Jin that existed there during the Spring and Autumn period (c. 770 – c. 481 BC). In later periods, Shanxi also became the political core of the Northern Wei, a Xianbei-founded dynasty whose early capital was located in present-day northern Datong. During the Ming and Qing dynasties, Shanxi merchants dominated China's commerce and finance. Their commercial networks extended to Russia, Japan, Korea, Central Asia, Southeast Asia, and South Asia. After the collapse of the Qing dynasty, Shanxi was governed for nearly four decades by Yan Xishan and functioned with a high degree of de facto autonomy within the Republic of China, serving as a major Kuomintang political and industrial stronghold in the north and being described as "the model province", before being incorporated into the state system of the People's Republic of China, where its role shifted toward that of a major energy-producing province.

The name Shanxi means 'west of the mountains', a reference to its location west of the Taihang Mountains. Shanxi borders Hebei to the east, Henan to the south, Shaanxi to the west and Inner Mongolia to the north. Shanxi's terrain is characterised by a plateau bounded partly by mountain ranges. Shanxi's culture is largely dominated by the ethnic Han majority, who make up over 99% of its population. Jin Chinese is the only major Sinitic variety in northern China that is not classified within the Mandarin group.

Shanxi possesses roughly one third of China's total coal reserves, a factor that has long shaped the province's industrial structure and energy role within the national economy. Despite this resource endowment, Shanxi's GDP per capita has remained below the national average, reflecting structural challenges associated with resource dependence, environmental constraints, and uneven economic diversification. The province hosts the Taiyuan Satellite Launch Center.

The province is also known for having by far the largest number of historic buildings among all Chinese provinces, with over 28,000 ancient structures in total and over 70% of China's surviving buildings built during or predating the Song dynasty. Shanxi has three UNESCO World Heritage Sites: Pingyao Ancient City, Yungang Grottoes, and Mount Wutai.

== History ==
=== Pre-Imperial China ===
In the Spring and Autumn period (c. 770 – c. 481 BC), the state of Jin was located in what is now Shanxi. It underwent a three-way split into the states of Han, Zhao, and Wei in 403 BC, a traditional date sometimes taken as the start of the Warring States period (c. 473 – 221 BC). By 221 BC, all of these states had fallen to the state of Qin, which established the Qin dynasty (221–206 BC).

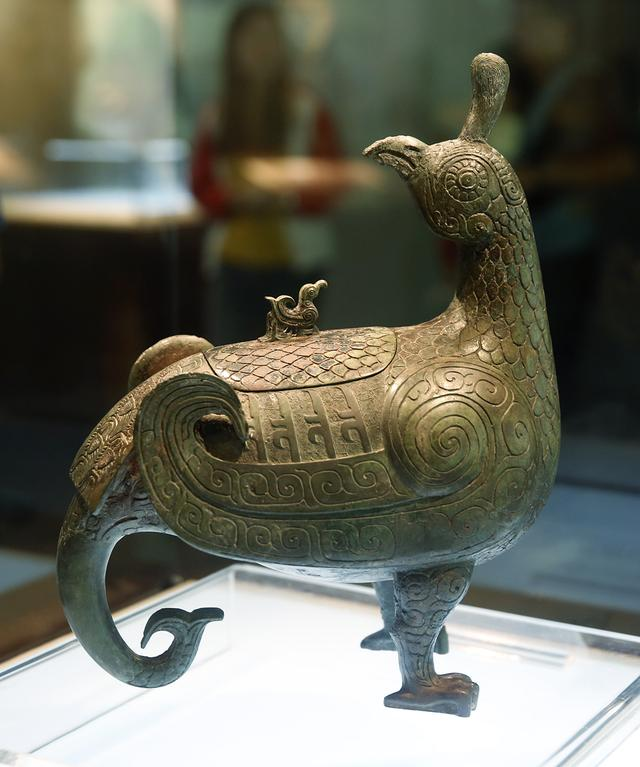
Bird-shaped ritual bronze vessel associated with the ruler of the Jin state, c. 10th–9th century BCE

=== Imperial China ===
The Han dynasty (206 BC – AD 220) ruled Shanxi as Bingzhou.

During the invasion of northern nomads in the Sixteen Kingdoms period (304–439), several regimes including the Later Zhao, Former Yan, Former Qin, and Later Yan continuously controlled Shanxi. They were followed by Northern Wei (386–534), a Xianbei kingdom, which had one of its earlier capitals at present-day Datong in northern Shanxi, and which went on to rule nearly all of northern China.

The Tang dynasty (618–907) originated in Taiyuan. During the Tang dynasty and after, present day Shanxi was called Hédōng (河東), or "east of the (Yellow) river". Empress Wu Zetian, one of China's only female rulers, was born in Shanxi in 624.

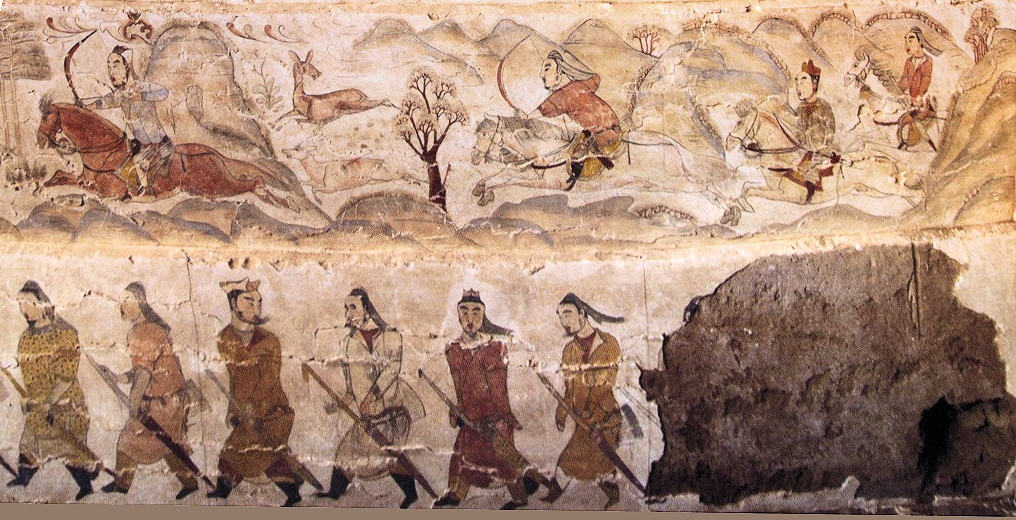
Wall painting from the Jiuyuangang Tomb in Xinzhou, 6th century CE, depicting mounted hunting scenes from the Northern Wei.

During the first part of the Five Dynasties and Ten Kingdoms period (907–960), Shanxi supplied rulers of three of the Five Dynasties. Among the Ten Kingdoms, it was the only one located in northern China. Shanxi was initially home to the jiedushi (commander) of Hedong, Li Cunxu, who overthrew the first of the Five Dynasties, Later Liang (907–923) to establish the second, Later Tang (923–936). Another jiedushi of Hedong, Shi Jingtang, overthrew Later Tang to establish the third of the Five Dynasties, Later Jin, and yet another jiedushi of Hedong, Liu Zhiyuan, established the fourth of the Five Dynasties (Later Han) after the Khitans destroyed Later Jin, the third. Finally, when the fifth of the Five Dynasties (Later Zhou) emerged, the jiedushi of Hedong at the time, Liu Chong, rebelled and established an independent state called Northern Han, one of the Ten Kingdoms, in what is now northern and central Shanxi.

Shi Jingtang, founder of the Later Jin, the third of the Five Dynasties, ceded a piece of northern China to the Khitans in return for military assistance. This territory, called the Sixteen Prefectures of Yanyun, included a part of northern Shanxi. The ceded territory became a major problem for the Song dynasty's defense against the Khitans for the next 100 years because it lay south of the Great Wall.

The later Zhou, the last dynasty of the Five Dynasties period was founded by Guo Wei, a Han Chinese, who served as the Assistant Military Commissioner at the court of the Later Han which was ruled by Shatuo Turks. He founded his dynasty by launching a military coup against the Turkic Later Han Emperor however, his newly established dynasty was short-lived and was conquered by the Song dynasty in 960.

In the early years of the Northern Song dynasty (960–1127), the sixteen ceded prefectures continued to be an area of contention between the Song dynasty and the Liao dynasty. Later the Southern Song dynasty abandoned all of North China, including Shanxi, to the Jurchen Jin dynasty (1115–1234) in 1127 after the Jingkang Incident of the Jin-Song wars.

Yuan dynasty murals at Yongle Gong in Ruicheng, depicting Chaoyuan Tu (朝元图), a formal audience of Daoist deities assembled in processio to Yuanshi Tianzun.

The Mongol Yuan dynasty administered China into provinces but did not establish Shanxi as a province, since Shanxi was regarded as part of the core region of the empire. Shanxi only gained its present name and approximate borders during the Ming dynasty (1368–1644) which were of the same land area and borders as the previous Hedong Commandery of the Tang dynasty. During the Qing dynasty (1644–1911), Shanxi extended north beyond the Great Wall to include parts of Inner Mongolia, including what is now the city of Hohhot, and overlapped with the jurisdiction of the Eight Banners and the Guihua Tümed banner in that area.

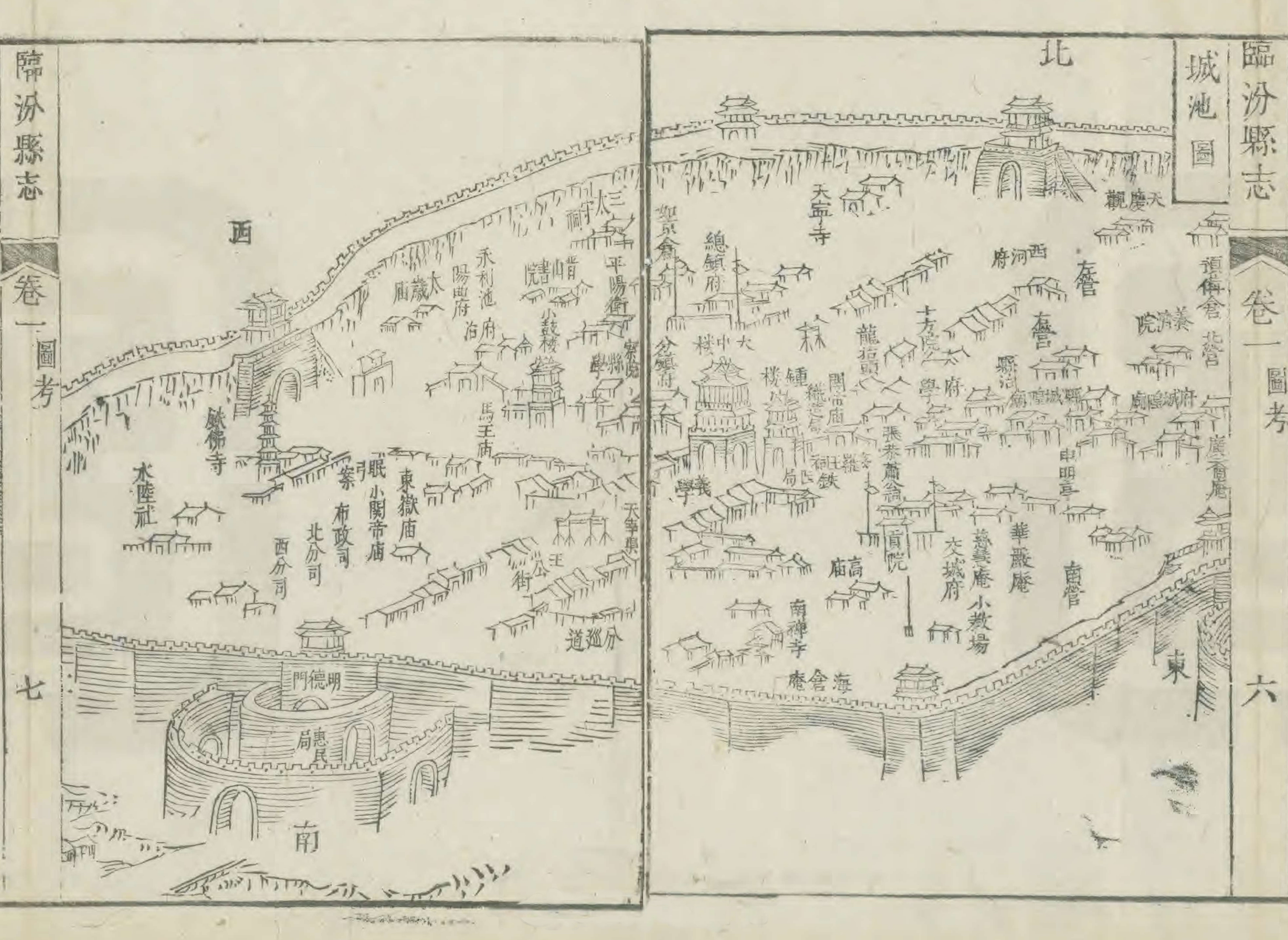
A city map of Linfen, Shanxi, drawn during the Kangxi Emperor reign of the Qing dynasty.

For centuries, Shanxi served as a center for trade and banking. The "Shanxi merchants" were once synonymous with wealth. The well-preserved city and UNESCO World Heritage Site Pingyao shows many signs of its economic importance during the Qing dynasty. This commercial strength remained evident into the late Qing period: following the Boxer Uprising, Empress Dowager Cixi resided in Shanxi during her westward flight, during which substantial financial contributions were presented by local officials and merchants.

=== Early Republic of China (1912–1937) ===
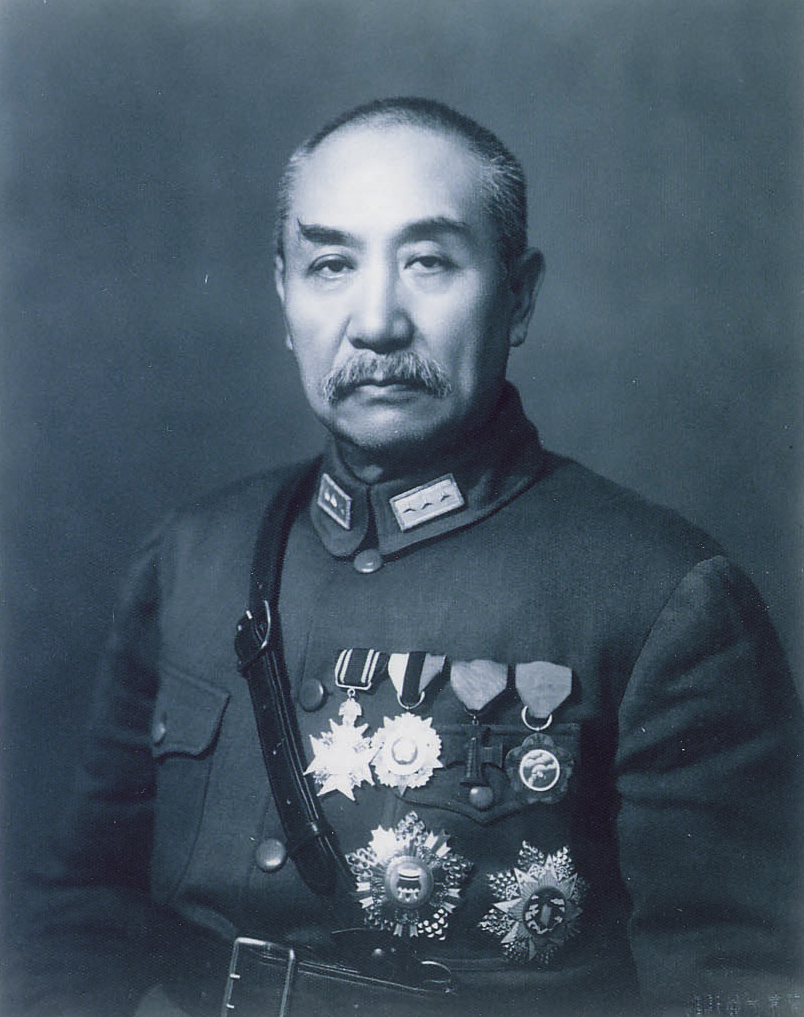
Yan Xishan (閻錫山), warlord of Shanxi during the Republic of China.

With the collapse of the Qing dynasty, Shanxi became part of the newly established Republic of China, the administrative relationship between Shanxi and its northern frontier regions underwent significant reorganization. During the early Republican period, areas north of the Great Wall that had previously been governed through overlapping provincial and banner systems were gradually separated from Shanxi's provincial administration.

In 1928, Suiyuan was formally established as a separate province, marking an institutional shift in the governance of North China's frontier regions. Despite this administrative separation, Shanxi and Suiyuan remained closely connected in military, political, and economic terms throughout much of the Republican era.

From 1911 to 1949, during the period of the Republic of China's period of rule over Mainland China, Shanxi was mostly dominated by the warlord Yan Xishan until the Chinese Communist Party took full control in 1949; Communists had already set up secret bases in 1936, but did not completely overturn Yan and the Nationalist government until 1949. Early in Yan's rule he decided that, unless he was able to modernize and revive the economy of his small, poor, remote province, he would be unable to protect Shanxi from rival warlords. Yan devoted himself to modernizing Shanxi and developing its resources during his reign over the province. He has been viewed by Western biographers as a transitional figure who advocated using Western technology to protect Chinese traditions, while at the same time reforming older political, social and economic conditions in a way that paved the way for the radical changes that would occur after his rule.

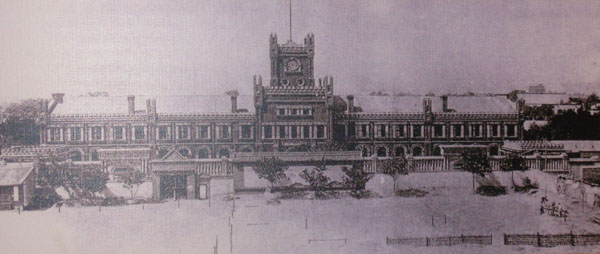
Shanxi University, 1904

In the early 20th century, Shanxi products such as Fenjiu were exhibited internationally; Fenjiu received a medal award at the 1915 Panama–Pacific International Exposition, indicating that Shanxi maintained active commercial production and trade networks into the late Qing and early Republican periods.

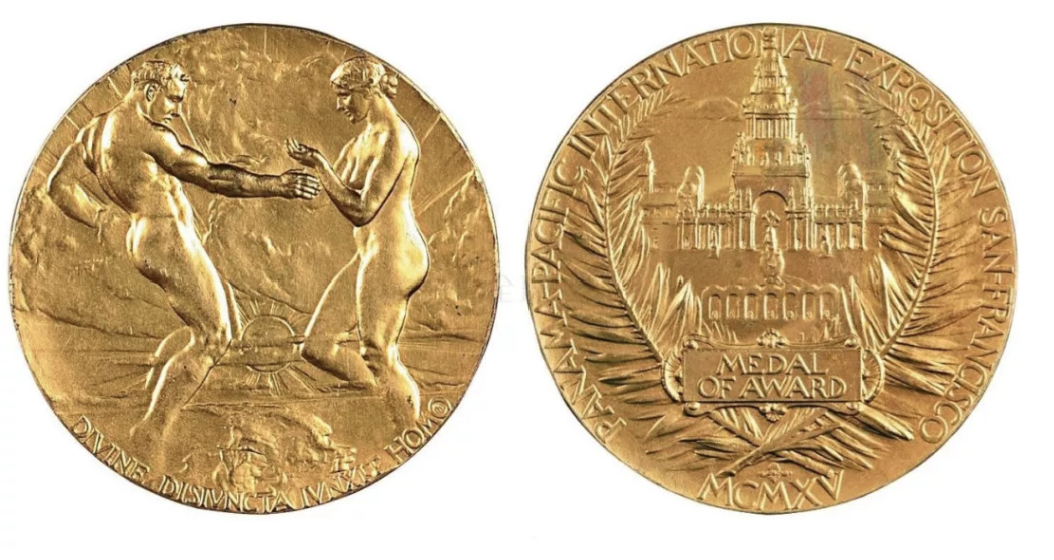
Gold Medal (First Class) awarded to Fenjiu at the Panama–Pacific International Exposition held in San Francisco, 1915

In 1918 there was an outbreak of bubonic plague in northern Shanxi that lasted for two months and killed 2,664 people. Yan's interactions with the Western medical personnel he met with to discuss how to suppress the epidemic inspired him to modernize and improve Shanxi's medical infrastructure which he began by funding the Research Society for the Advancement of Chinese Medicine, based in Taiyuan, in 1921. Highly unusual in China at the time, the school had a four-year curriculum and included courses in both Chinese and Western Medicine. The main skills that Yan hoped physicians trained at the school would learn were: a standardized system of diagnosis; sanitary science, including bacteriology; surgical skills, including obstetrics; and, the use of diagnostic instruments. Yan hoped that his support of the school would eventually lead to increased revenues in the domestic and international trade of Chinese drugs, improved public health, and improved public education. Yan's promotion of a modern curriculum and infrastructure of Chinese medicine achieved limited success, but much of the teaching and publication that this school of medicine produced was limited to the area around Taiyuan: by 1949 three of the seven government-run hospitals were in the city. In 1934 the province produced a ten-year-plan that envisaged employing a hygiene worker in every village, but the Japanese invasion in 1937 and the subsequent civil war made it impossible to carry these plans out. Yan's generous support for the Research Association for the Improvement of Chinese Medicine generated a body of teaching and publication in modern Chinese medicine that became one of the foundations of the national institution of modern traditional Chinese medicine that was adopted in the 1950s.

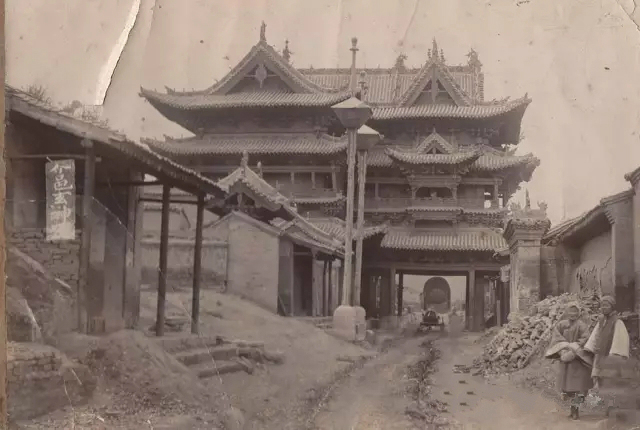
A view of Shanxi during the early Republic of China: Xianshen Lou, a Zoroastrian temple in Jiexiu.

Yan invested in Shanxi's industrial infrastructure, and by 1949 the area around Taiyuan was a major national producer of coal, iron, chemicals, and munitions. Yan was able to protect the province from his rivals for the period of his rule partially due to his building of an arsenal in Taiyuan that, for the entire period of his administration, remained the only center in China capable of producing field artillery. Yan's army was successful in eradicating banditry in Shanxi, allowing him to maintain a relatively high level of public order and security. Yan went to great lengths to eradicate social traditions which he considered antiquated. He insisted that all men in Shanxi abandon their Qing-era queues, giving police instructions to clip off the queues of anyone still wearing them. In one instance, Yan lured people into theatres in order to have his police systematically cut the hair of the audience. He attempted to combat widespread female illiteracy by creating in each district at least one vocational school in which peasant girls could be given a primary-school education and taught domestic skills. After National Revolutionary Army military victories in the 1925 generated great interest in Shanxi for the Kuomintang's ideology, including women's rights, Yan allowed girls to enroll in middle school and college, where they promptly formed a women's association.

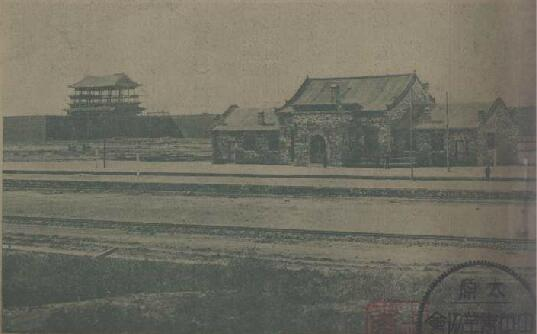
Main station at Taiyuan, Tongpu Railway, 1935

Yan attempted to eradicate the custom of foot binding, threatening to sentence men who married women with bound feet, and mothers who bound their daughters' feet, to hard labor in state-run factories. He discouraged the use of the traditional lunar calendar and encouraged the development of local boy scout organizations. Like the Communists who later succeeded Yan, he punished habitual lawbreakers to "redemption through labour" in state-run factories.

Between 1933 and 1937, architectural historians Liang Sicheng and Lin Huiyin, working with the Society for Research in Chinese Architecture, conducted extensive field surveys of ancient timber buildings across Shanxi, documenting numerous Tang-, Song-, Liao-, and Jin-dynasty structures and establishing the province's central place in the study of traditional Chinese architecture.

After the failed attempt by the Chinese Red Army to establish bases in southern Shanxi in early 1936 Yan became convinced that the Communists were lesser threats to his rule than either the Nationalists or the Japanese. He then negotiated a secret anti-Japanese "United Front" with the Communists in October 1936 and invited them to establish operations in Shanxi. Yan, under the slogan "resistance against the enemy and defense of the soil", attempted to recruit young, patriotic intellectuals to his government in order to organize a local resistance to the threat of Japanese invasion. By the end of 1936 Taiyuan had become a gathering point for anti-Japanese intellectuals from all over China.

=== Second Sino-Japanese War and the Chinese Civil War (1937–1949) ===
The Marco Polo Bridge Incident in July 1937 led the Imperial Japanese Armed Forces to invade China, and Shanxi was one of the first areas the Japanese attacked. When it became clear to Yan that his forces might not be successful in repelling the Imperial Japanese Army, he invited Communist military forces to re-enter Shanxi. Zhu De became the commander of the Eighth Route Army active in Shanxi and was named the vice-commander of the Second War Zone, under Yan himself. Yan initially responded warmly to the re-entry of the arrival of Communist forces, and they were greeted with enthusiasm by Yan's officials and officers. Communist forces arrived in Shanxi just in time to help defeat a decisively more powerful Japanese force attempting to move through the strategic Pingxing Pass. The Battle of Pingxingguan was the largest battle won by the Communists against the Japanese.

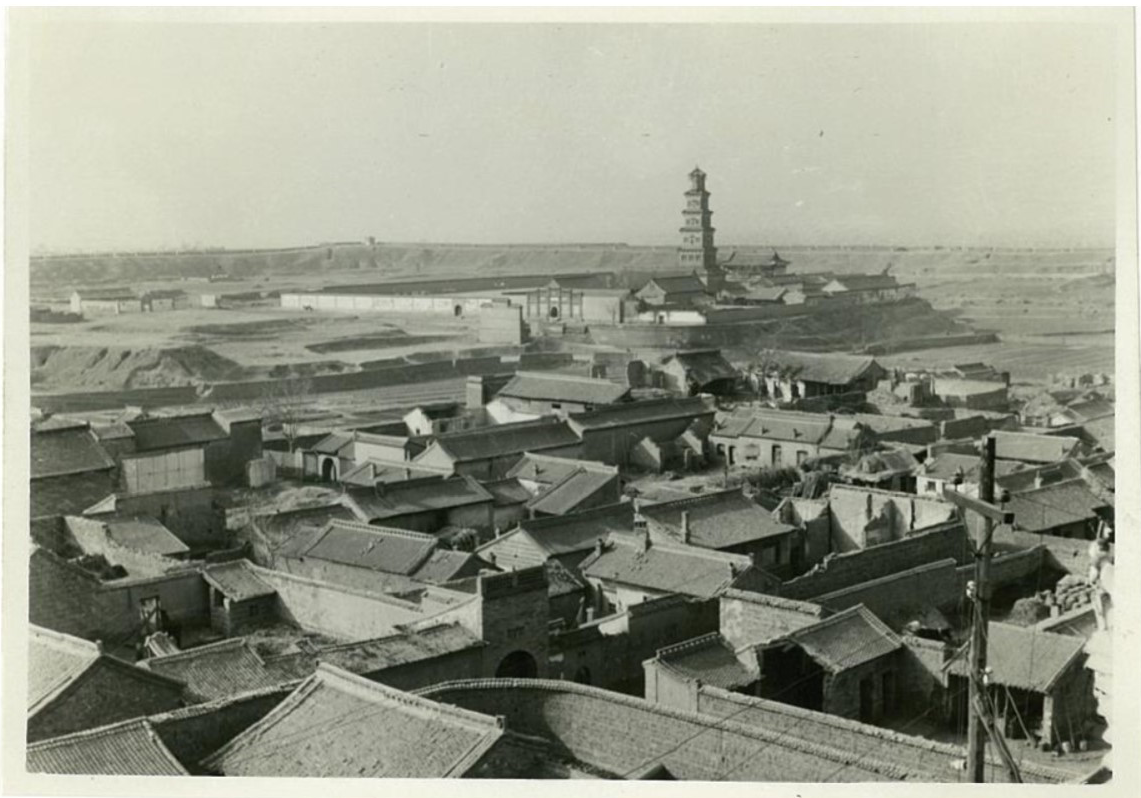
Datong photographed by Japanese archaeologists and historians Hibino Takeo and Mizuno Seiichi.

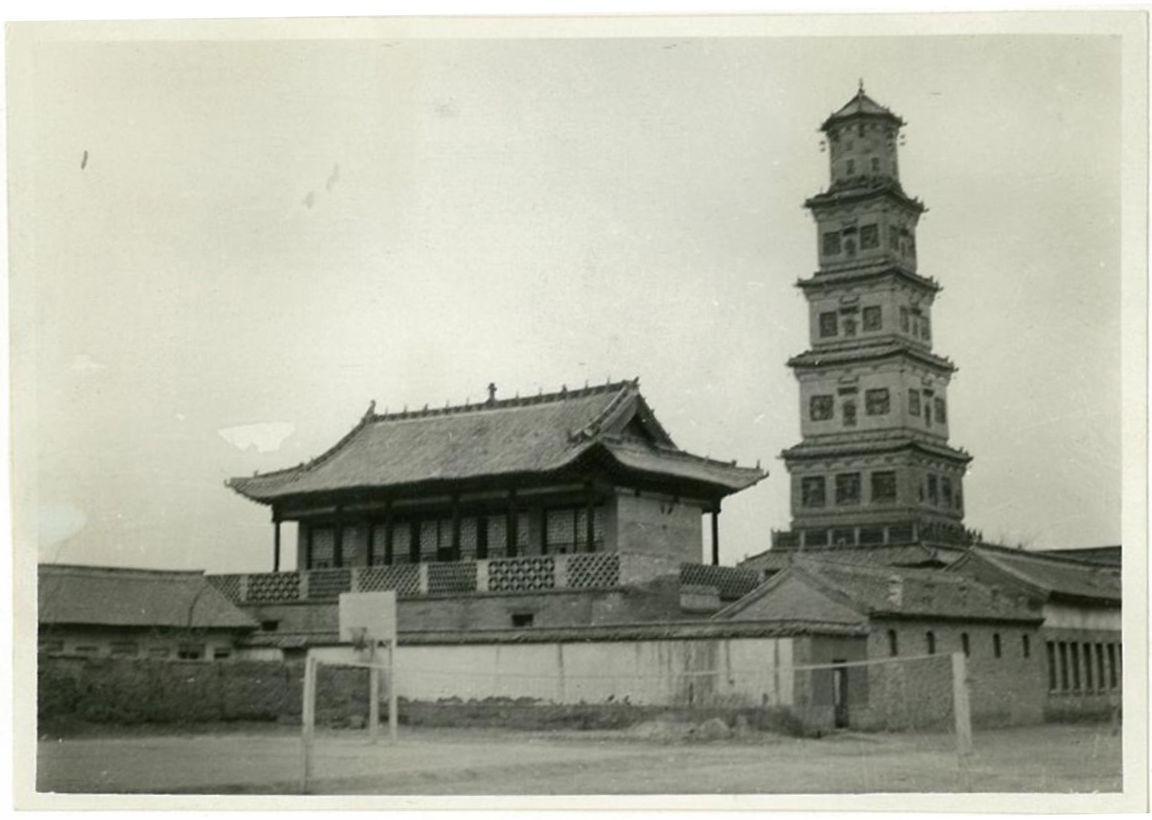
Linfen, photographed during the same archaeological survey.

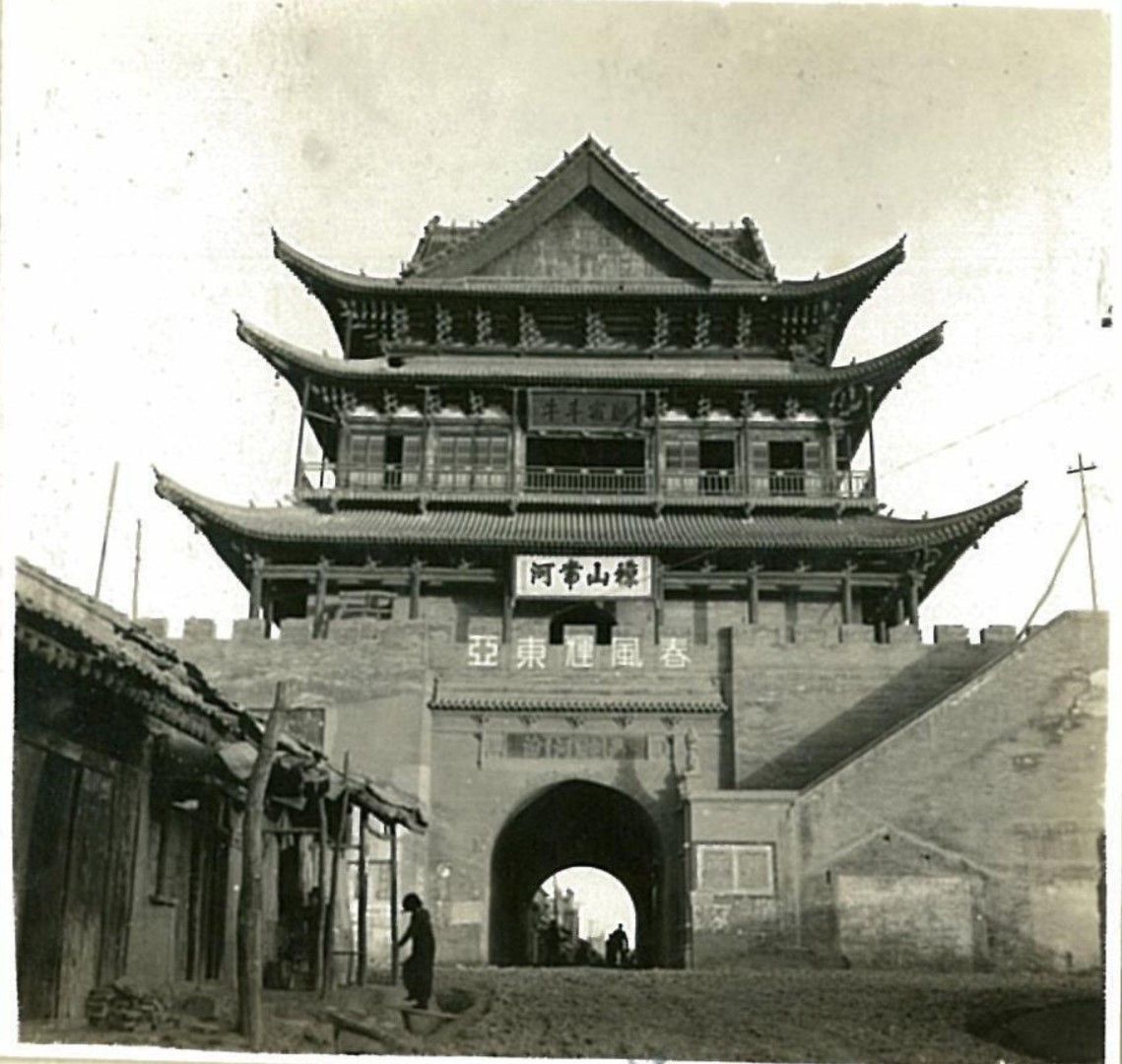
Dazhong Pavilion, Linfen

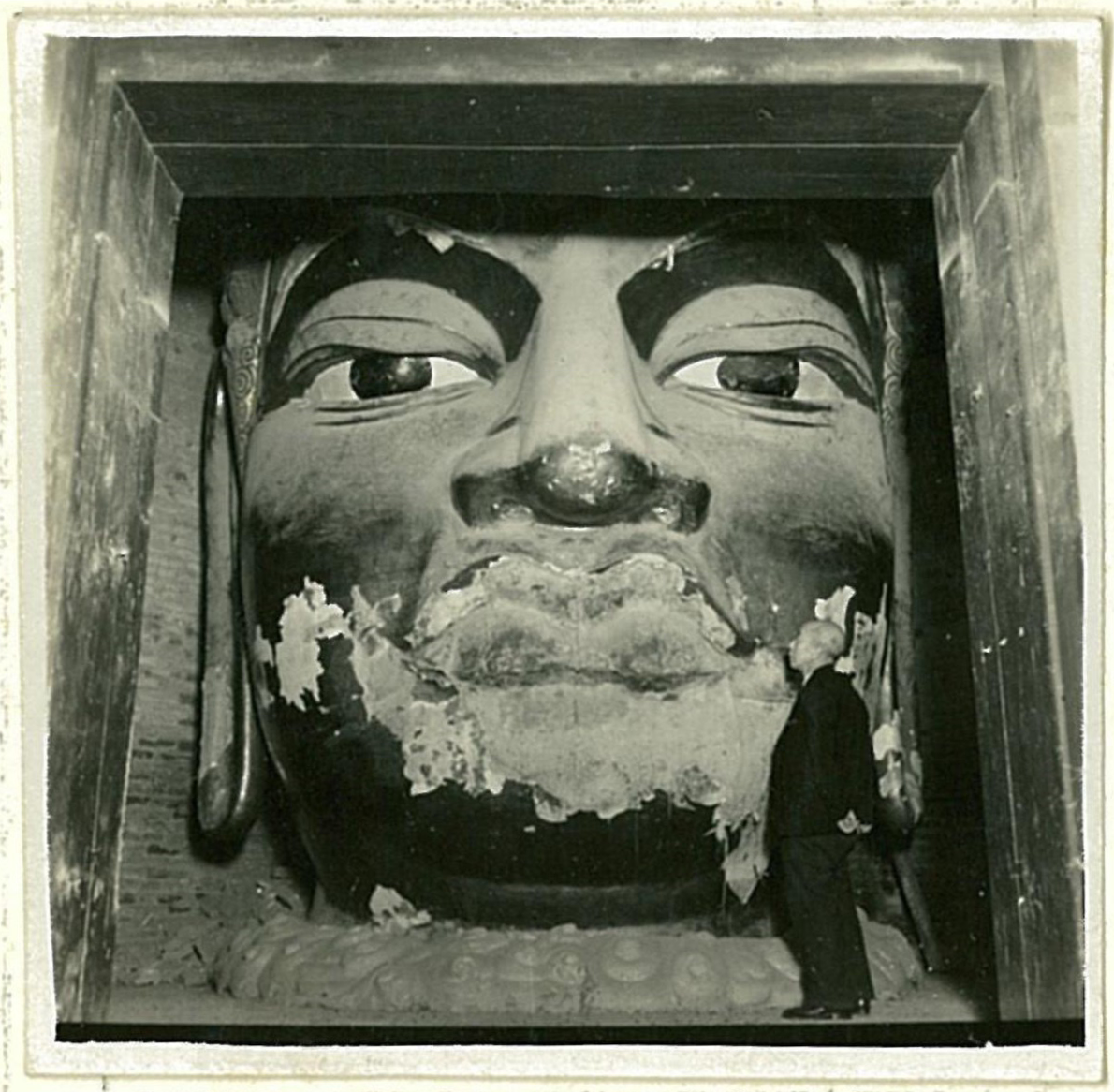
Iron head of a Buddhist statue from Dayun Chan Temple (大云禅寺), Linfen.

After the Japanese responded to this defeat by outflanking the defenders and moving towards Taiyuan, the CCP avoided decisive battles and mostly attempted to harass Japanese forces and sabotage Japanese lines of supply and communication. The Japanese suffered, but mostly ignored the Eighth Route Army and continued to advance towards Yan's capital. The lack of attention directed at their forces gave the CCP time to recruit and propagandize among the local peasant populations (who generally welcomed Communist forces enthusiastically) and to organize a network of militia units, local guerrilla bands and popular mass organizations. Genuine CCP efforts to resist the Japanese gave them the authority to carry out sweeping and radical social and economic reforms, mostly related to land and wealth redistribution, which they defended by labeling those who resisted as Hanjian. Communist efforts to resist the Japanese also won over Shanxi's small population of patriotic intellectuals, and conservative fears of resisting them effectively gave the Communists unlimited access to the rural population. Subsequent atrocities committed by the Japanese in the effort to rid Shanxi of Communist guerrillas aroused the hatred of millions in the Shanxi countryside, causing the rural population to turn to the Communists for leadership against the Japanese. All of these factors explain how, within a year of re-entering Shanxi, the Communists were able to take control of most of Shanxi not firmly held by the Japanese.

During the Battle of Xinkou, the Chinese defenders resisted the efforts of Japan's elite Itakagi Division for over a month, despite Japanese advantages in artillery and air support. By the end of October 1937, Japan's losses were four times greater than those suffered at Pingxingguan, and the Itakagi Division was close to defeat. Contemporary Communist accounts called the battle "the most fierce in North China", while Japanese accounts called the battle a "stalemate". In an effort to save their forces at Xinkou, Japanese forces began an effort to occupy Shanxi from a second direction, in the east. After a week of fighting, Japanese forces captured the strategic Niangzi Pass, opening the way to capturing Taiyuan. Communist guerrilla tactics were ineffective in slowing down the Japanese advance. The defenders at Xinkou, realizing that they were in danger of being outflanked, withdrew southward, past Taiyuan, leaving a small force of 6,000 men to hold off the entire Japanese army. A representative of the Japanese Army, speaking of the final defense of Taiyuan, said that "nowhere in China have the Chinese fought so obstinately".

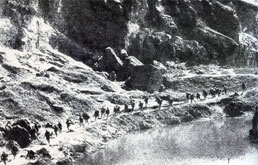
Chinese troops marching to defend the mountain pass at Xinkou.

The Japanese suffered 30,000 dead and an equal number wounded in their effort to take northern Shanxi. A Japanese study found that the battles of Pingxingguan, Xinkou, and Taiyuan were responsible for over half of all the casualties suffered by the Japanese army in North China. Yan himself was forced to withdraw after having 90% of his army destroyed, including a large force of reinforcements sent into Shanxi by the central government. Throughout 1937, numerous high-ranking Communist leaders, including Mao Zedong, lavished praise on Yan for waging an uncompromising campaign of resistance against the Japanese. Possibly because of the severity of his losses in northern Shanxi, Yan abandoned a plan of defense based on positional warfare, and began to reform his army as a force capable of waging guerrilla warfare. After 1938 most of Yan's followers came to refer to his regime as a "guerrilla administration".

After the surrender of Japan and the end of the Second World War, Yan Xishan was notable for his ability to recruit thousands of Japanese soldiers stationed in northwest Shanxi in 1945, including their commanding officers, into his army. By recruiting the Japanese into his service in the manner that he did, he retained both the extensive industrial complex around Taiyuan and virtually all of the managerial and technical personnel employed by the Japanese to run it. Yan was so successful in convincing surrendered Japanese to work for him that, as word spread to other areas of north China, Japanese soldiers from those areas began to converge on Taiyuan to serve his government and army. At its greatest strength the Japanese "special forces" under Yan totaled 15,000 troops, plus an officer corps that was distributed throughout Yan's army. These numbers were reduced to 10,000 after serious American efforts to repatriate the Japanese were partially successful. Yan's Japanese army was instrumental in helping him to retain control of most of northern Shanxi during much of the subsequent Chinese Civil War, but by 1949 casualties had reduced the number of Japanese soldiers under Yan's command to 3,000. The leader of the Japanese under Yan's command, Hosaku Imamura, committed suicide on the day that Taiyuan fell to Communist forces.

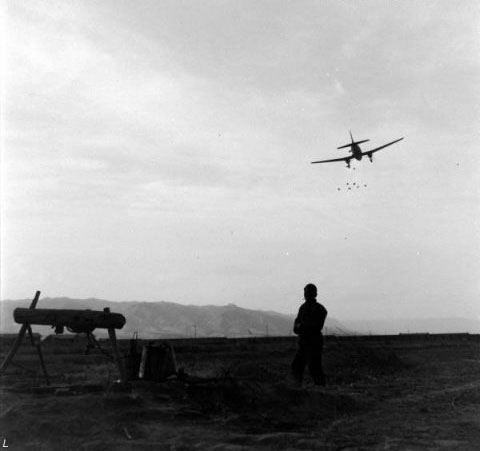
In 1949, the Republic of China Air Force airdropped supplies to the defenders of the Taiyuan National Army.

Yan Xishan himself (along with most of the provincial treasury) was airlifted out of Taiyuan in March 1949. Shortly afterwards Republic of China Air Force planes stopped dropping food and supplies for the defenders due to fears of being shot down by the advancing Communists. The People's Liberation Army, depending largely on their reinforcements of artillery, launched a major assault on April 20, 1949, and succeeded in taking all positions surrounding Taiyuan by April 22. A subsequent appeal to the defenders to surrender was refused. On the morning of April 22, 1949, the PLA bombarded Taiyuan with 1,300 pieces of artillery and breached the city's walls, initiating bloody street-to-street fighting for control of the city. At 10:00 am, April 22, the Taiyuan Campaign ended with the Communists in complete control of Shanxi. Total Nationalist casualties amounted to all 145,000 defenders, many of whom were taken as POWs. The Communists lost 45,000 men and an unknown number of civilian laborers they had drafted, all of whom were either killed or injured. The fall of Taiyuan was one of the few examples in the Chinese Civil War in which Nationalist forces echoed the defeated Ming loyalists who had, in the 17th century, brought entire cities to ruins resisting the invading Manchus. Many Nationalist officers were reported to have committed suicide when the city fell. The dead included Yan's nephew-in-law, who was serving as governor, and his cousin, Yan Huiqing (閻慧卿), who ran his household. Liang Huazhi, the head of Yan's "Patriotic Sacrifice League", had fought for years against the Communists in Shanxi until he was finally trapped in the massively fortified city of Taiyuan. For six months Liang put up a fierce resistance, leading both Yan's remaining Republic of China Army forces and his thousands of Japanese mercenaries. When Communist troops finally broke into the city and began to occupy large sections of it, Liang barricaded himself inside a large, fortified prison complex filled with Communist prisoners. In a final act of desperation, Liang set fire to the prison and committed suicide as the entire compound burned to the ground.

On the eve of Yan Huiqing's suicide by poisoning, she drafted the "Last Farewell Telegram." After being refined by Wu Shaozhi, Secretary-General of the Shanxi Provincial Government, it was transmitted to her cousin, Yan Xishan, and Kuomintang central government. The full text reads:

For days the cannon fire has thundered like rolling storms, deafening to the ears; shells fly like rain, striking terror into the heart. Outside, smoke and flames spread everywhere, a vast sea of fire; inside, darkness and deathly stillness prevail, and all thoughts are extinguished. The overall situation is lost, and street fighting can no longer be sustained. Xu Duan has gone to his death; Dunhou has decided to perish with the city. Soldiers and civilians without number bathe the streets in blood; five hundred colleagues achieve righteousness in the flames.

Though I am but a woman, my resolve to die is already fixed. Having witnessed jade shatter, how could I dare remain whole like tile? Living, I have been unable to turn the nation's disastrous course even by the slightest margin; in death, I shall obey instructions so that my remains will not fall into enemy hands.

At this message's end, words cannot fully express my feelings. This life is already finished; our parting is forever. If there is a next life, may reunion not be an empty illusion. At the moment I send this message, I am still among the living; by the time elder brother reads it, we shall already be separated by life and death. Flames rise before the buildings; collapse comes from the hills behind. Death presses upon my brow, yet my heart has turned calm. Alas—is this Heaven's summons? Or is it the compassion of our ancestors?

— Yan Huiqing, Director of the Shanxi Branch of the Wartime Child Care Association

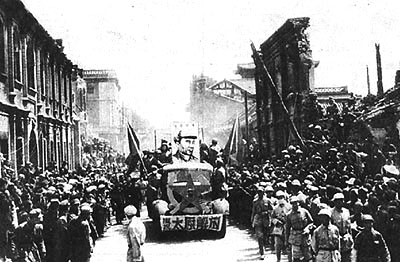
People's Liberation Army parade after they captured Taiyuan, April 24, 1949

Taiyuan remained under Kuomintang (KMT) control until one day after the fall of Nanjing, the capital at the time, by which point it stood as the isolated final KMT stronghold in North China. The fall of Taiyuan brought Kuomintang rule in the North to a definitive end. The battle for Taiyuan lasted more than six months and is regarded by Chinese Communist Party's official historical record as one of the longest, largest, most intense, and most costly urban siege battles of the Chinese Civil War, in terms of duration, number of combatants, intensity of fighting, and casualties.

=== People's Republic of China (1949–present) ===
Soon after the Chinese Communist Revolution, Mao Zedong assigned Kang Sheng to carry out land reform in Shanxi. Kang encouraged the populace to have numerous farmers from a variety of socioeconomic backgrounds denounced as "landlords", beaten, arrested, and executed. In some areas of the province as many as one in five residents were denounced as landlords, and his program was copied throughout the rest of the new People's Republic of China. Shanxi became the site of Mao's "model brigade" of Dazhai: a utopian communist scheme in Xiyang County that was supposed to be the model for all other peasants in China to emulate. If the people of Dazhai were especially suited for such an experiment, it is possible that decades of Yan's socialist indoctrination may have prepared the people of Shanxi for Communist rule. After the death of Mao, the experiment was discontinued, and most peasants reverted to private farming under the reform and opening up.

Beyond land reform and the Dazhai campaign, the early decades of the People's Republic of China saw Shanxi transformed into one of the country's primary bases for coal production and heavy industry, a role reinforced during successive phases of socialist industrialization and national defense planning.

During the Cultural Revolution (1966–1976), political upheaval and institutional disruption significantly affected the province's administrative, educational, and industrial systems, Shanxi was affected by the "Destroy the Four Olds" campaign, though the full extent of damage to the province's cultural heritage remains unquantified. During the preceding Great Leap Forward, timber from some historic buildings had been stripped for use as fuel in backyard furnaces, though the scale is difficult to assess precisely. Notable incidents of destruction during the decade include: the demolition of the Shun Emperor Mausoleum in Yuncheng; the smashing of a pair of stone lions approximately six meters tall before the Yuncheng Guan Yu Temple, with the five cubs carved on the body of the female lion shattered; the destruction of Buddhist and Luohan statues within the Yuqing Chan Courtyard at Sima Guang's tomb in Xiaxian County; and the near-total destruction of over a hundred temples and historic sites within Taiyuan, from which the director of the provincial museum was able to salvage only a small number of clay sculpture fragments. Mount Wutai's Buddhist community was also devastated: before the Cultural Revolution, the mountain housed approximately 304 monks and nuns, of whom 239 were forcibly relocated to their home regions and 36 were sent back under supervised labor; of 124 temples that had existed before the Cultural Revolution, only 63 remained by 1977, with fewer than ten in relatively intact condition. In 1969, two temples on Mount Wutai, the Wulang Temple and Jingang Cave, both originally founded in the Tang dynasty and rebuilt during the Ming and Qing, were razed with explosives to make way for a villa for Lin Biao, with their architecture, statuary, and cultural artifacts destroyed entirely and their monks expelled.

Following the introduction of economic reforms in the late 1970s, Shanxi experienced slower diversification compared with coastal regions, as its economy remained heavily dependent on coal and state-owned enterprises. In the 1990s and 2000s, the rapid expansion of coal extraction brought both economic growth and serious challenges, including industrial accidents, environmental degradation, and governance issues. In the mid-2010s, Shanxi became the focus of a large-scale anti-corruption campaign that reshaped the province's political leadership. Since then, provincial authorities have pursued economic restructuring and diversification, though structural constraints associated with resource dependence continue to pose challenges.

== Geography ==
=== Topography ===
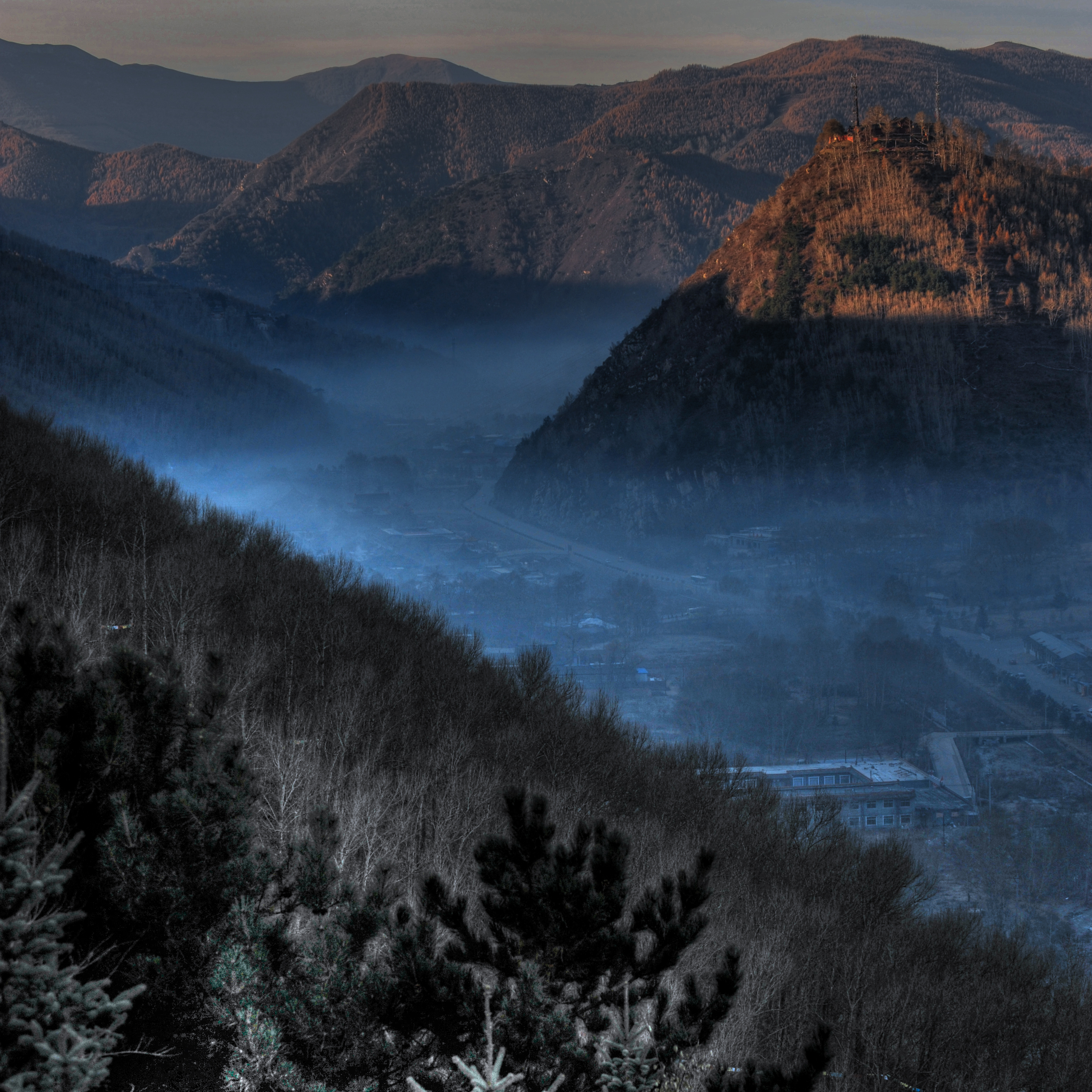
Wutai Mountains

Shanxi is located on a plateau made up of higher ground to the east (Taihang Mountains) and the west (Lüliang Mountains) and a series of valleys in the center through which the Fen River runs. The highest peak is Mount Wutai (Wutai Shan) in northeastern Shanxi with an altitude of 3,058 m. The Great Wall of China forms most of the northern border with Inner Mongolia. The Zhongtiao Mountains run along part of the southern border and separate Shanxi from the east–west part of the Yellow River. Mount Hua is to the southwest. The province has a length of 682 km (424 mi) and a width of 385 km (239 mi) from east to west, with a total area of 156,700 km^{2} (60,500 sq mi), accounting for 1.6% of the country's total area.

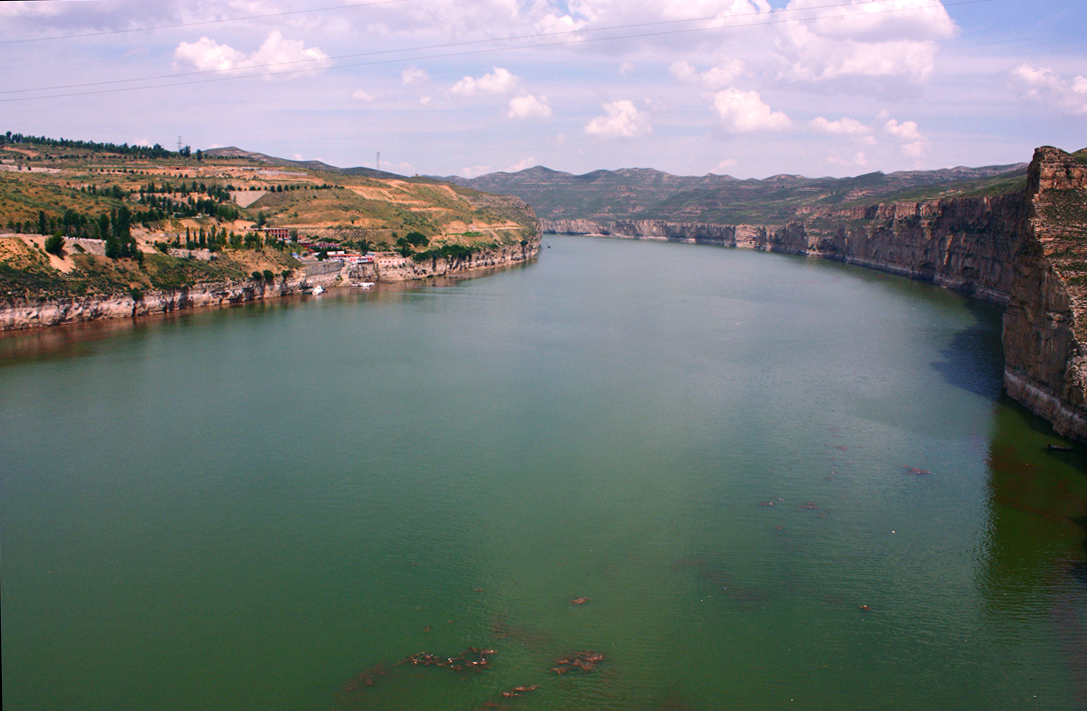
The Yellow River flowing through Shanxi

The Yellow River forms the western border of Shanxi with Shaanxi. The Fen and Qin rivers, tributaries of the Yellow River, run north-to-south through the province, and drain much of its area. The north of the province is drained by tributaries of the Hai River, such as Sanggan and Hutuo rivers. The largest natural lake in Shanxi is Xiechi Lake, a salt lake near Yuncheng in southwestern Shanxi.

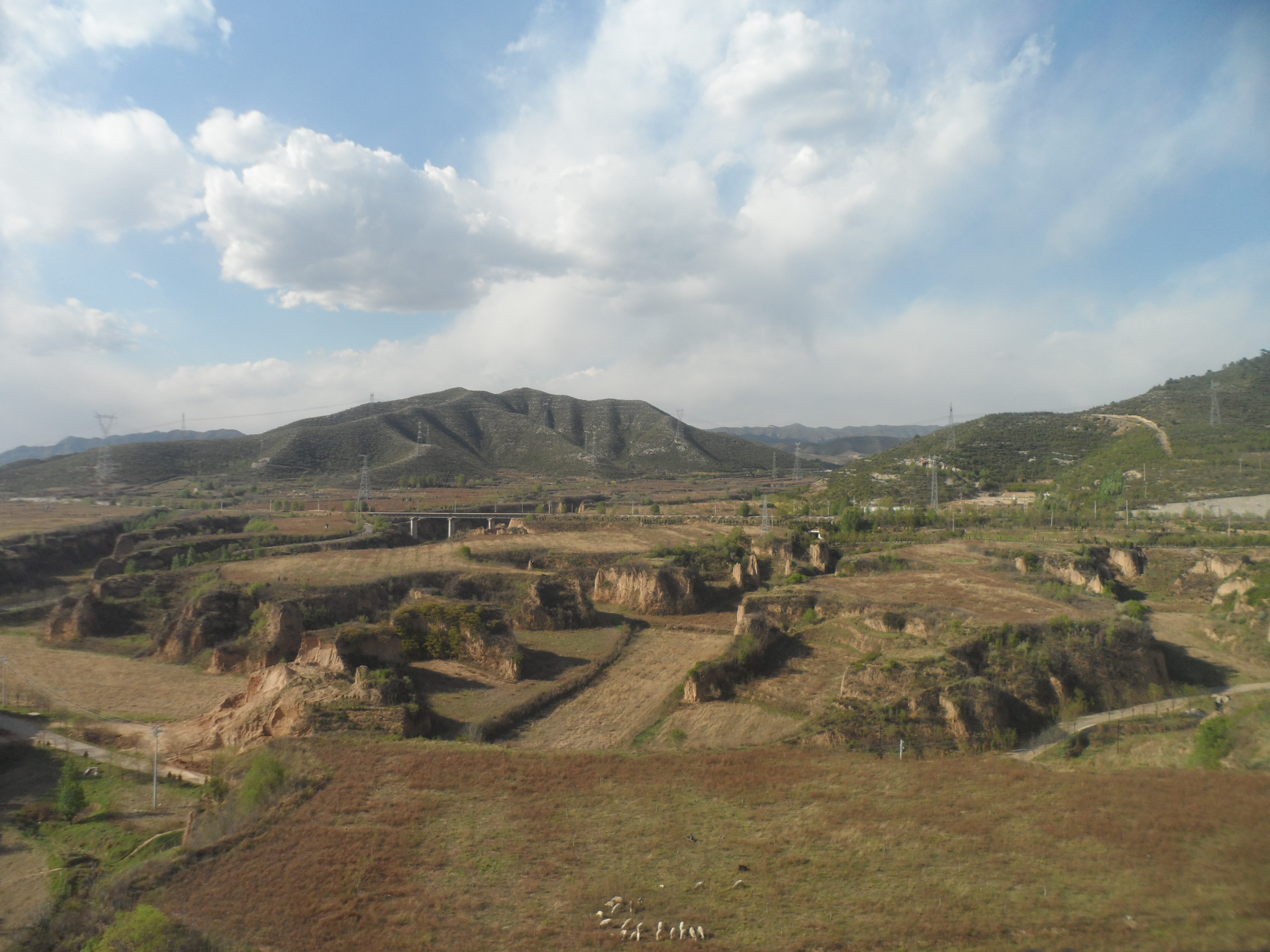
Loess plateau landscape in Shanxi, marked by deep gullies and eroded terrain

The outline of Shanxi's territory is a parallelogram that runs from southwest to northeast. It is a typical mountain plateau widely covered by loess. The terrain is high in the northeast and low in the southwest. The interior of the plateau is undulating, the valleys are vertical and horizontal, and the types of landforms are complex and diverse. There are mountains, hills, terraces, plains, and rivers. The area of mountains and hills accounts for 80.1% of the total area of the province, and the area of Pingchuan and river valleys accounts for 19.9% of the total area. Most of the province's altitude is above 1,500 meters, and the highest point is the Yedoufeng, the main peak of Wutai Mountain, with an altitude of 3061.1 meters, which is the highest peak in northern China.

=== Climate ===
Shanxi is located in the inland of the mid-latitude zone and belongs to the temperate continental monsoon climate in terms of climate type. Average January temperatures are below 0 °C, while average July temperatures are around 21–26 °C. Winters are long, dry, and cold, while summer is warm and humid. Spring is extremely dry and prone to dust storms. Shanxi is one of the sunniest parts of China; early summer heat waves are common. Annual precipitation averages around 350 to 700 millimetres (14 to 28 in), with 60% of it concentrated between June and August. Due to the influence of solar radiation, monsoon circulation and geographical factors, Shanxi's climate has four distinct seasons, synchronous rain and heat, sufficient sunshine, significant climate difference between north and south, wide temperature difference between winter and summer, and large temperature difference between day and night. The annual average temperature in Shanxi Province is between 4.2 and 14.2 °C. The overall distribution trend is from north to south and from basin to high mountain. The annual precipitation in the whole province is between 358 and 621 mm, and the seasonal distribution is uneven. In June–August, the precipitation is relatively concentrated, accounting for about 60% of the annual precipitation, and the precipitation distribution in the province is greatly affected by the terrain.

=== Ecology ===
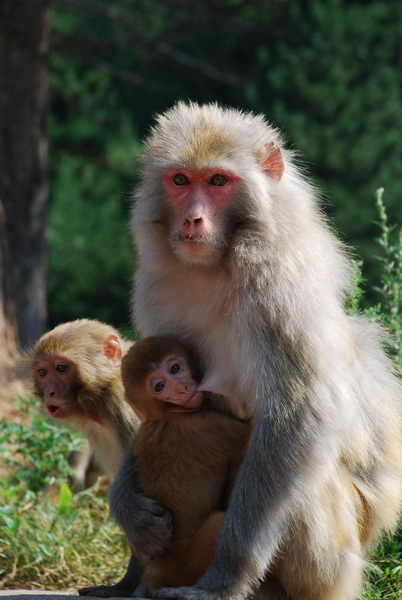
Wild monkeys in Qinyuan, Changzhi

Shanxi encompasses a wide range of ecosystem types, including forests, grasslands, wetlands, desert and semi-desert areas, agricultural landscapes, and urban ecosystems. According to official surveys, Shanxi is home to approximately 2,743 species of terrestrial wild plants and 543 species of terrestrial wild animals. Representative protected animals found in Shanxi include the brown-eared pheasant (Crossoptilon mantchuricum), which is endemic to northern China, as well as the golden eagle (Aquila chrysaetos), golden snub-nosed monkey (Rhinopithecus roxellana), leopard (Panthera pardus), sika deer (Cervus nippon), forest musk deer (Moschus berezovskii), and Eurasian otter (Lutra lutra). These species are distributed across forested mountain regions, river systems, and associated habitats.

== Politics ==
=== Governor's Mansion ===
The front gate of Shanxi Governor's Mansion, officially "General Office of Shanxi Provincial People's Government" from 1949 to 2017

The site commonly known as the Shanxi Dujunfu (山西督军府), literally the military governor's mansion, in Taiyuan represents the longest-standing center of political authority in Shanxi. Historical records trace the site's administrative function back more than a millennium: prior to the Song dynasty it was the location of a shrine dedicated to Duke Wen of Jin, while in 982 it was converted into the headquarters of the Song general Pan Mei. Under the Yuan dynasty the site served as the seat of a Branch Secretariat, and during the Ming and Qing periods it functioned continuously as the office of the provincial governor of Shanxi.

Following the fall of the Qing dynasty, the complex became the Shanxi military governor's headquarters, acquiring the name Dujunfu after 1916 when Yan Xishan assumed the title of provincial military governor. The existing architectural ensemble was largely shaped during the Republican period and subsequent occupation years. After the establishment of the People's Republic of China in 1949, the compound continued to serve as the seat of the Shanxi provincial government, a role it retained until 2019. Building No. 5 was the principal office building of the Shanxi provincial government during the PRC era.

Shanxi provincial government

The complex covers approximately 35,000 square meters and preserves a traditional axial layout typical of Chinese administrative architecture, including ceremonial gates, main halls, courtyards, and garden spaces. Recognized as a provincial-level protected cultural heritage site in 1986, the Dujunfu underwent major conservation and restoration campaigns beginning in the mid-2010s. In 2017, the Shanxi provincial government relocated its offices, formally ending the site's administrative use and marking its transition into a public heritage museum.

=== Xishan Clique ===
In the 2000s, an informal and secretive network known as the Xishan Clique (西山会) emerged linked to Shanxi through birth, family origin, or ancestral affiliation operating primarily in Beijing. According to findings and commentary released by China's disciplinary authorities, the network was functioned as a clandestine political–business circle and closely associated with Ling Jihua, a senior central government official who served as Director of the General Office of the Chinese Communist Party, a position responsible for managing the party's central administration and serving as a key aide to then General Secretary Hu Jintao.

The association lacked a publicly known written charter or membership procedures. Its name, Xishan (西山), was a reversal of Shanxi (山西), and literally means 'The West Mount Society', underscoring the group's regional identity and internal cohesion. According to media reports, the meeting venue of the clique was located in the western suburbs of Beijing, and contact among its members was maintained through gatherings held at intervals of no less than once every three months. During these gatherings, luxury vehicles were reportedly arranged for transportation, while mobile phones, personal secretaries, and lovers were required to be kept away. If an official was able to obtain access to the Xishan dinner parties, this could present opportunities for promotion.

Following Xi Jinping's assumption of the post of General Secretary of the Chinese Communist Party in 2012, central anti-corruption investigations dismantled the network. Multiple individuals identified as core participants were investigated and imprisoned, and the case was cited by disciplinary authorities as an example of illicit elite networking within the party–state system.

=== System of governance ===
The Governor of Shanxi is the highest-ranking official in the People's Government of Shanxi. However, in the province's dual party-government governing system, the Governor is subordinate to the Party Secretary of Shanxi. As is the case in almost all Chinese provinces, the provincial party secretary and Governor are not natives of Shanxi; rather, they are outsiders who are, in practice, appointed by the central party and government authorities.

The province went through significant political instability since 2004, due largely to the number of scandals that have hit the province on labour safety, the environment, and the interconnected nature between the provincial political establishment and big coal companies. Yu Youjun was sent by the central government in 2005 to become Governor but resigned in the wake of the Shanxi slave labour scandal in 2007. He was succeeded by Meng Xuenong, who had been previously sacked as Mayor of Beijing in the aftermath of the SARS outbreak. Meng himself was removed from office in 2008 after only a few months on the job due to the political fallout from the 2008 Shanxi mudslide. In 2008, provincial Political Consultative Conference Chair, one of the highest-ranked provincial officials, Jin Yinhuan, died in a car accident.

Since Xi Jinping's ascendancy to General Secretary of the Chinese Communist Party at the 18th Party Congress, numerous highly ranked officials in Shanxi have been placed under investigation for corruption-related offenses, including four incumbent members Bai Yun, Chen Chuanping, Du Shanxue, and Nie Chunyu of the provincial Communist Party Standing Committee. They were all removed from office around August 2014. The following were also removed from office:

- Ling Zhengce, the provincial Political Consultative Conference vice-chair and the older brother of Ling Jihua;
- Ling Jihua, the province's Vice Governor Ren Runhou;
- Shen Weichen, former Taiyuan party secretary;
- Liu Suiji, Taiyuan police secretary;
- Jin Daoming, vice-chair of the provincial People's Congress;
- Wang Maoshe, Yuncheng party secretary; and
- Feng Lixiang, Datong party secretary

Thousands of Shanxi officials were disciplined during the anti-corruption campaign under Xi Jinping. This necessitated a scramble to find suitable personnel for many vacated offices.

== Economy ==
=== Commerce ===
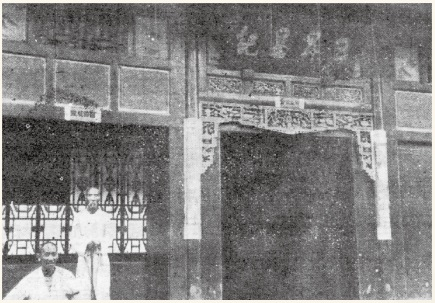
The front gate of Rishengchang's headquarters, photographed during the Qing Dynasty.

Shanxi merchants, or Jin merchants (晉商), constituted a historical phenomenon that lasted for centuries from the Song to the Qing dynasty. During the Qing dynasty, they dominated China's commerce and finance, with commercial networks extending to Russia, Japan, Korea, Central Asia, Southeast Asia, and South Asia. They controlled the overland tea trade with Russia and Mongolia, monopolized trade routes across the Great Wall, and handled the Qing government's tax remittances between provinces.

Over centuries, Shanxi merchants developed a multi-tiered financial system serving different social strata. Pawnshops (dangpu 當鋪) served impoverished farmers, artisans, and downwardly-mobile gentry; seal shops (yinzihao 印子號) provided microloans to the urban poor; money shops (qianzhuang 錢莊) served small wholesalers, retailers, and officials; and draft banks (piaohao) handled large-scale transactions for major wholesalers and government agencies, typically exceeding 500 taels per transaction. These institutions were interconnected through capital flows: pawnshops relied on loans from money shops, which in turn obtained operating capital from draft banks.

During the late Qing dynasty, a new development occurred: the creation of piaohao (票號), which were essentially banks that provided services like money transfers, deposits, and loans. After the establishment of the first piaohao, Rishengchang, in Pingyao in 1823, Shanxi bankers dominated China's financial market. At their peak, Shanxi piaohao operated over 400 branches across China and processed the majority of the government's fiscal transfers.

Shanxi merchants continued to wield significant influence over China's economy into the Republican era. The Kung family of Taigu, led by H. H. Kung, accumulated vast wealth and wielded direct control over the national economy through his positions as Minister of Finance and Governor of the Central Bank of China until 1949.

=== Industry ===
The current GDP per capita of Shanxi is below the national average. Compared to the provinces in east China, Shanxi is less developed for many reasons. Its national strategic positioning and geographic location limits its participation in modern international trade, which involves mostly eastern coastal provinces. Important crops in Shanxi include wheat, maize, millet, legumes, and potatoes. The local climate and dwindling water resources limit agriculture in Shanxi.

Mining-related industries are a major part of Shanxi's economy. Shanxi possesses 260 billion metric tons of known coal deposits, about a third of China's total. As a result, Shanxi is a leading producer of coal in China and has more coal companies than any other province, with an annual production exceeding 300 million metric tonnes. The Datong (大同), Ningwu (宁武), Xishan (西山), Hedong (河东), Qinshui (沁水), and Huoxi (霍西) coalfields are some of the most important in Shanxi. Shanxi also contains about 500 million tonnes of bauxite deposits, about a third of total Chinese bauxite reserves. Industry in Shanxi is centered around heavy industries such as coal and chemical production, power generation, and metal refining.

As part of an effort to promote diversification in non-resource industries, since 2004, some local governments in Shanxi province have required that coal mining companies set aside funds for investing in non-coal business like agriculture and produce processing. In 2006, the provincial government established a policy of "subsidizing peasants by coal" which made this diversification a provincewide requirement and encouraged local governments to develop policies like subsidies and favorable tax treatment to further encourage mining companies to invest in non-coal business.

There are countless military-related industries in Shanxi due to its geographic location and history as the former base of the Chinese Communist Party and the People's Liberation Army. Taiyuan Satellite Launch Centre, one of China's three satellite launch centers, is located in the middle of Shanxi with China's largest stockpile of nuclear missiles.

Many private corporations, in joint ventures with the state-owned mining corporations, have invested billions of dollars in the mining industry of Shanxi. Hong Kong billionaire Li Ka-shing made one of his largest investments ever in China in exploiting coal gas in Shanxi. Foreign investors include mining companies from Canada, the United States, Japan, the United Kingdom, Germany and Italy.

The mining-related companies include Daqin Railway Co. Ltd., which runs one of the busiest and most technologically advanced railways in China, connecting Datong and Qinhuangdao exclusively for coal shipping. The revenue of Daqin Railway Co. Ltd. is among the highest among Shanxi companies due to its export of coal to Japan, Korea, and Southeast Asia.

Shanxi's nominal GDP in 2011 was 1110.0 billion yuan (US$176.2 billion), ranked 21st in China. Its per-capita GDP was 21,544 yuan (US$3,154).

Shanxi is affected by cases of bad working conditions in coal mining and other heavy industries. Thousands of workers have died every year in those industries. Cases of child labour abuse were discovered in 2011. The central government has responded by increasing oversight, including the suspension of four coal mines in August 2021, as well as ongoing investigations in Shanxi and neighboring Shaanxi.

On 22 May 2026, an explosion at the Liushenyu coal mine in Shanxi killed 82 people and injured over 120. The disaster was linked to safety violations, unregistered workers, and secret tunnels, showing the risks in China's coal industry despite safety reforms and the country's push toward green energy.

==== Industrial zones ====
Taiyuan Economic and Technology Development Zone

Taiyuan Economic and Technology Development Zone is a state-level development zone approved by the State Council in 2001, with a planned area of 9.6 km^{2} (3.7 sq mi). It is only 2 km (1.2 mi) from Taiyuan Airport and 3 km (1.9 mi) from the railway station. National Highways 208 and 307 pass through the zone. So far, it has formed a "four industrial base, a professional industry park" development pattern.

Taiyuan Hi-Tech Industrial Development Zone

Established in 1991, Taiyuan Hi-Tech Industrial Development Zone is the only state-level high-tech development zone in Shanxi, with total area of 24 km^{2} (9.3 sq mi). It is close to Taiyuan Wusu Airport and Highway G208. The nearest port is Tianjin.

=== Tourism ===
Tourism contributes approximately 4% of Shanxi's GDP. There are 3 UNESCO World Cultural Heritage sites in the province, namely The Ancient City of Pingyao (including Shuanglin Temple and Zhenguo Temple), Yungang Grottoes and Mount Wutai. Some of the notable sites are listed below.

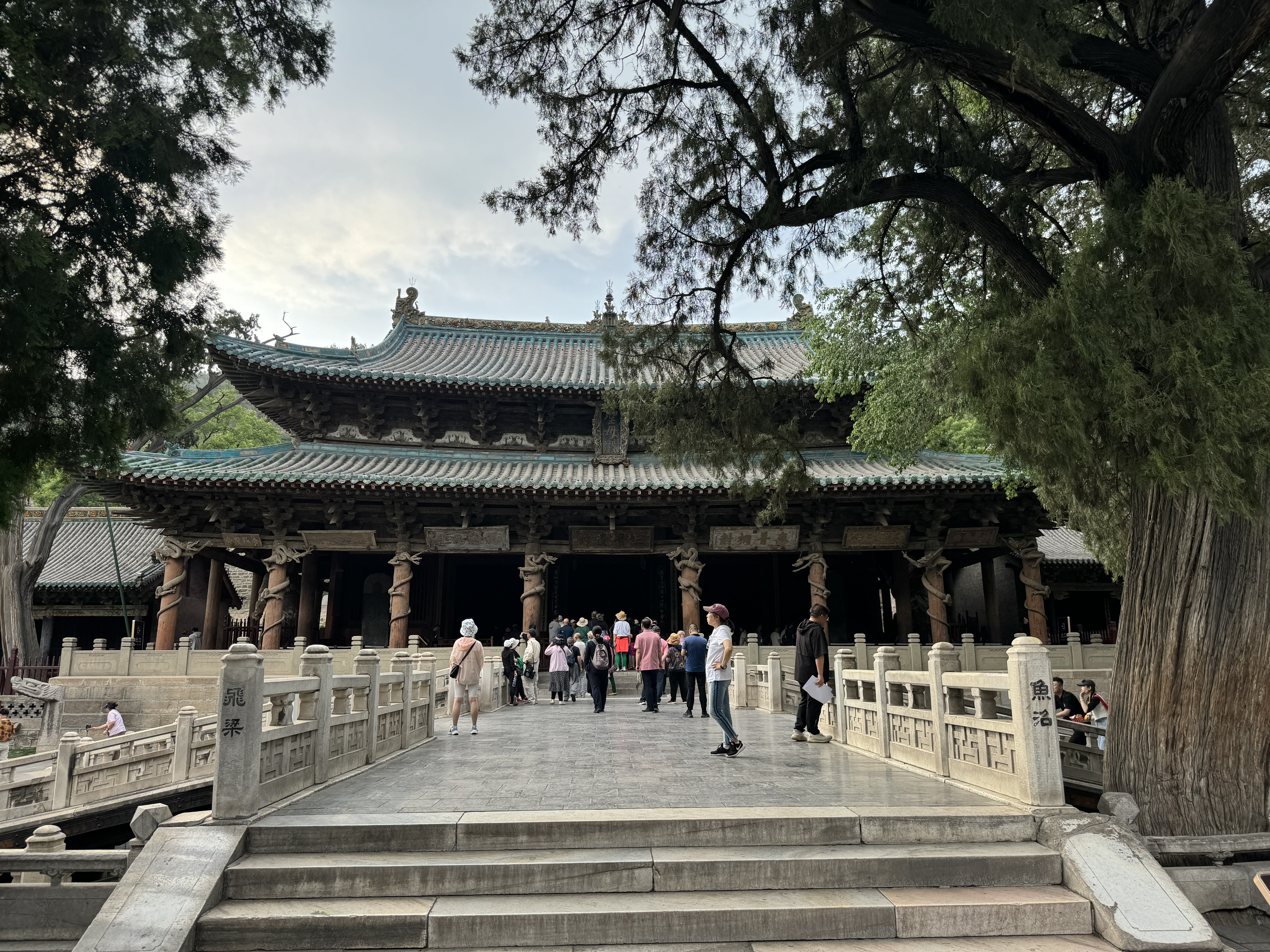
- Hall of the Holy Mother (晉祠聖母殿), constructed in 1032 CE, Jinci
  Jinci, a royal temple in Taiyuan, dating back to the Zhou dynasty, noted for its temples, Song dynasty paintings and architecture.
- The Ancient City of Pingyao is a county town noted for its state of preservation; It boasts a variety of Ming and Qing dynasties.
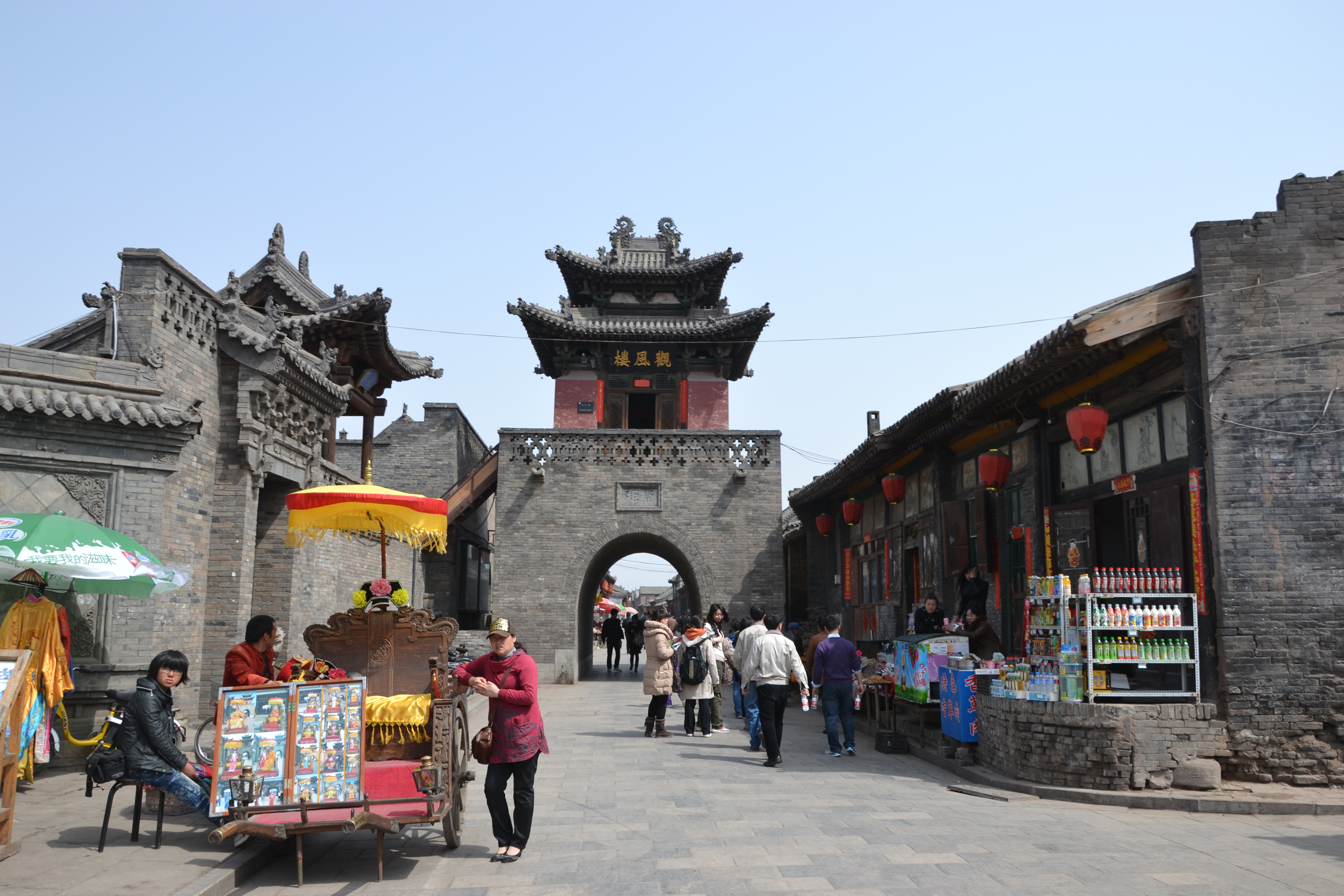
  The Ancient City of Pingyao
- The Yungang Grottoes, its literal translation being the Cloud Ridge Caves, is a World Heritage Site near Datong. The site consists of 252 shallow caves containing over 50,000 carved statues and reliefs of Buddhas and Boddhisatvas, dating from the 5th and 6th centuries, and ranging from 4 centimeters to 7 meters tall.
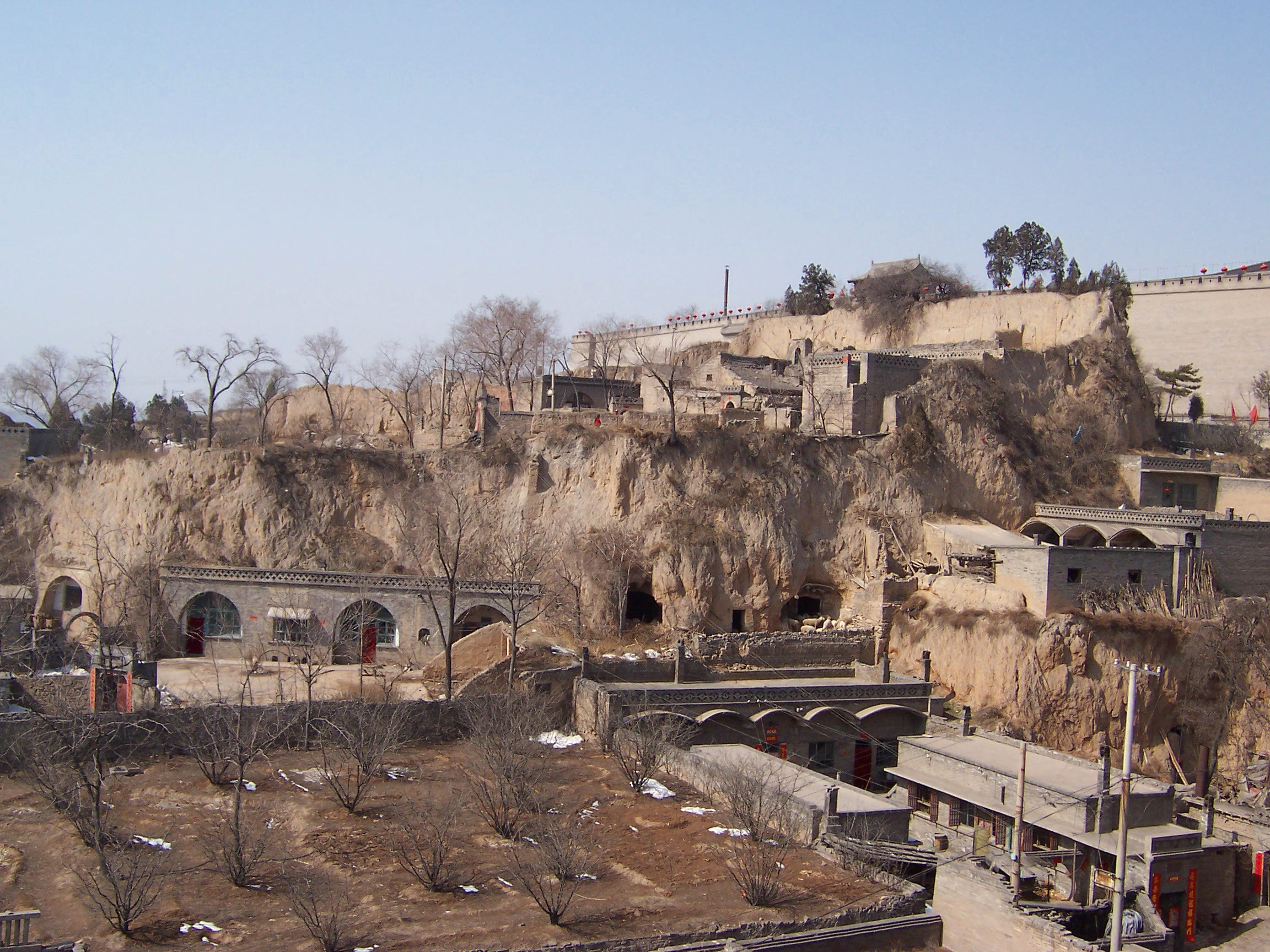
  Traditional cave houses in Lingshi. In the background, a part of the walls of the Chongningbu complex, which belongs to the Wang Family Compound (王家大院).
- Mount Wutai (Wutai Shan) is the highest point in the province. It is known as the residence of the bodhisattva Manjusri, and as a result is also a major Buddhist pilgrimage destination, with many temples and natural sights. Points of interest include Tang dynasty (618–907) era timber halls located at Nanchan Temple and Foguang Temple, as well as a giant white stupa at Tayuan Temple built during the Ming dynasty (1368–1644).
- Mount Hengshan (Heng Shan), in Hunyuan County, is one of the "Five Great Peaks" of China, and is also a major Taoist site. Not far from Hengshan, the Hanging Temple is located on the side of a cliff and has survived for 1,400 years despite earthquakes in the area.
- Pagoda of Fogong Temple, in Ying County, is a pagoda built in 1056 during the Liao dynasty. It is octagonal with nine levels (five are visible from outside), and at 67 m (220 ft) in height, it is currently the tallest wooden pagoda in the world. It is also the oldest fully wooden pagoda in China, although many no-longer-existing wooden pagodas have preceded it, and many existing stone and brick pagodas predate it by centuries.
- Yongle Gong, a Song dynasty Taoist temple complex noted for the wall paintings inside its three main halls.
- Hukou Waterfall is located in the Yellow River on the Shanxi-Shaanxi border. At 50 meters, it is the second highest waterfall in China.
- Zuoquan County, known for its Chinese Communist Party battlefield sites.
- Dazhai is a village in Xiyang County. Situated in hilly, difficult terrain, it was revered during the Cultural Revolution as exemplary of the hardiness of the proletariat, especially peasants.
- Niangziguan Township is located in northeast Pingding County which is at the junction of Shanxi and Heibei Province. It is an old village noted for the Niangzi Pass.
- Susan Prison is an ancient prison located in Hongtong, the middle of Shanxi. The prison is built during the Ming dynasty (1369) and is the only well-preserved ancient prison in China.

== Transportation ==
Shanxi has eight civil airports, 147,700 km of highways, including 6,446 km of expressways. Total railway track in operation is 6,489 km, including 1,347 km of high-speed rail.

=== Road ===
Shanxi's road hub is in the capital, Taiyuan. The major highways in province form a road network connecting all the counties. Examples of major highways are:

- G5 Beijing–Kunming Expressway (京昆高速), running north–south through central Shanxi
- G55 Erenhot–Guangzhou Expressway (二广高速), traversing eastern Shanxi from Datong to Jincheng
- G59 Hohhot–Beihai Expressway (呼北高速), running through western Shanxi
- G18 Rongcheng–Wuhai Expressway (荣乌高速), crossing northern Shanxi
- G20 Qingdao–Yinchuan Expressway (青银高速), crossing central Shanxi through Taiyuan
- G22 Qingdao–Lanzhou Expressway (青兰高速), crossing southeastern Shanxi

=== Rail ===
Railway construction in Shanxi began in the late Qing dynasty. The Zhengding–Taiyuan Railway (正太铁路, now Shijiazhuang–Taiyuan Railway), Shanxi's first railway, was built between 1904 and 1907 with French capital and technology. Today, the province has an extensive rail network centered on Taiyuan, with major trunk lines including:

- Tongpu Railway (同蒲铁路): The 865 km north–south spine of Shanxi's rail network, running from Datong through Taiyuan to Fenglingdu, where it crosses the Yellow River to join the Longhai Railway.
- Datong–Qinhuangdao Railway (大秦铁路): China's first heavy-haul coal railway and principal "coal from west to east" corridor, with annual capacity exceeding 400 million tonnes, the highest of any railway in the world.
- Shuozhou–Huanghua Railway (朔黄铁路): A 614 km dedicated coal line connecting Shenchi County to Huanghua Port in Hebei, China's second-largest west-to-east coal corridor.
- Shijiazhuang–Taiyuan Railway (石太铁路): Connecting Shanxi to the Beijing–Guangzhou Railway and coastal regions.
- Taiyuan–Jiaozuo Railway (太焦铁路): Linking Taiyuan to Henan Province.
- Beijing–Yuanping Railway (京原铁路): Providing access to Beijing.

High-speed rail services include the Shijiazhuang–Taiyuan and Datong–Xi'an passenger dedicated lines.

=== Aviation ===
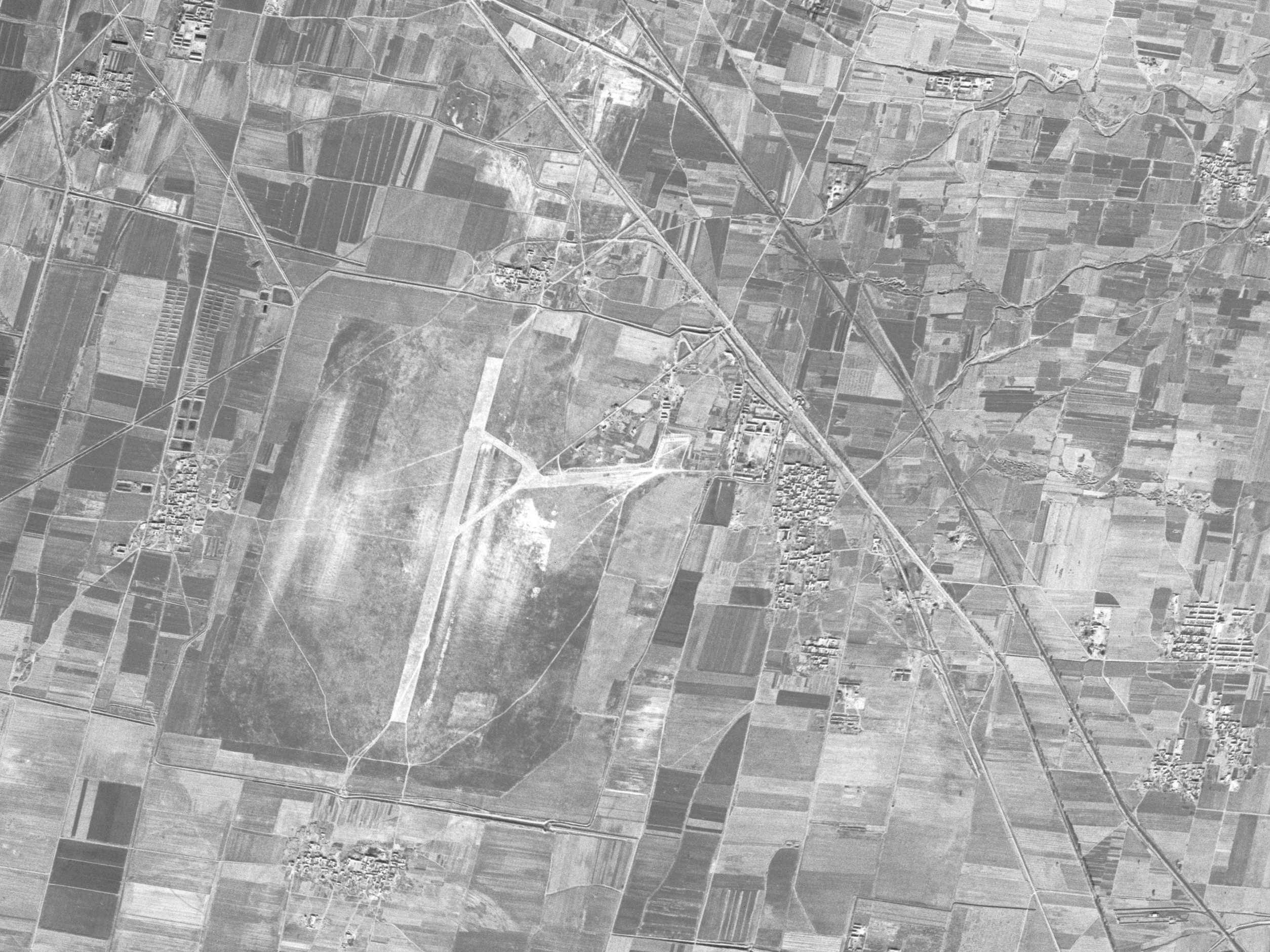
Taiyuan Wusu International Airport Satellite Image in 1968

Shanxi's largest aviation transport hub is Taiyuan Wusu International Airport (IATA: TYN). The airport has routes connecting Shanxi to 28 domestic cities including Beijing, Shanghai, Xi'an, Shenzhen, Chengdu and Chongqing. There are two additional international airports in Datong and Yuncheng. These airports currently operate a limited number of international routes, primarily to destinations such as Hong Kong, Nagoya, Moscow, Ulaanbaatar, Bangkok, and Seoul, in addition to their domestic services.

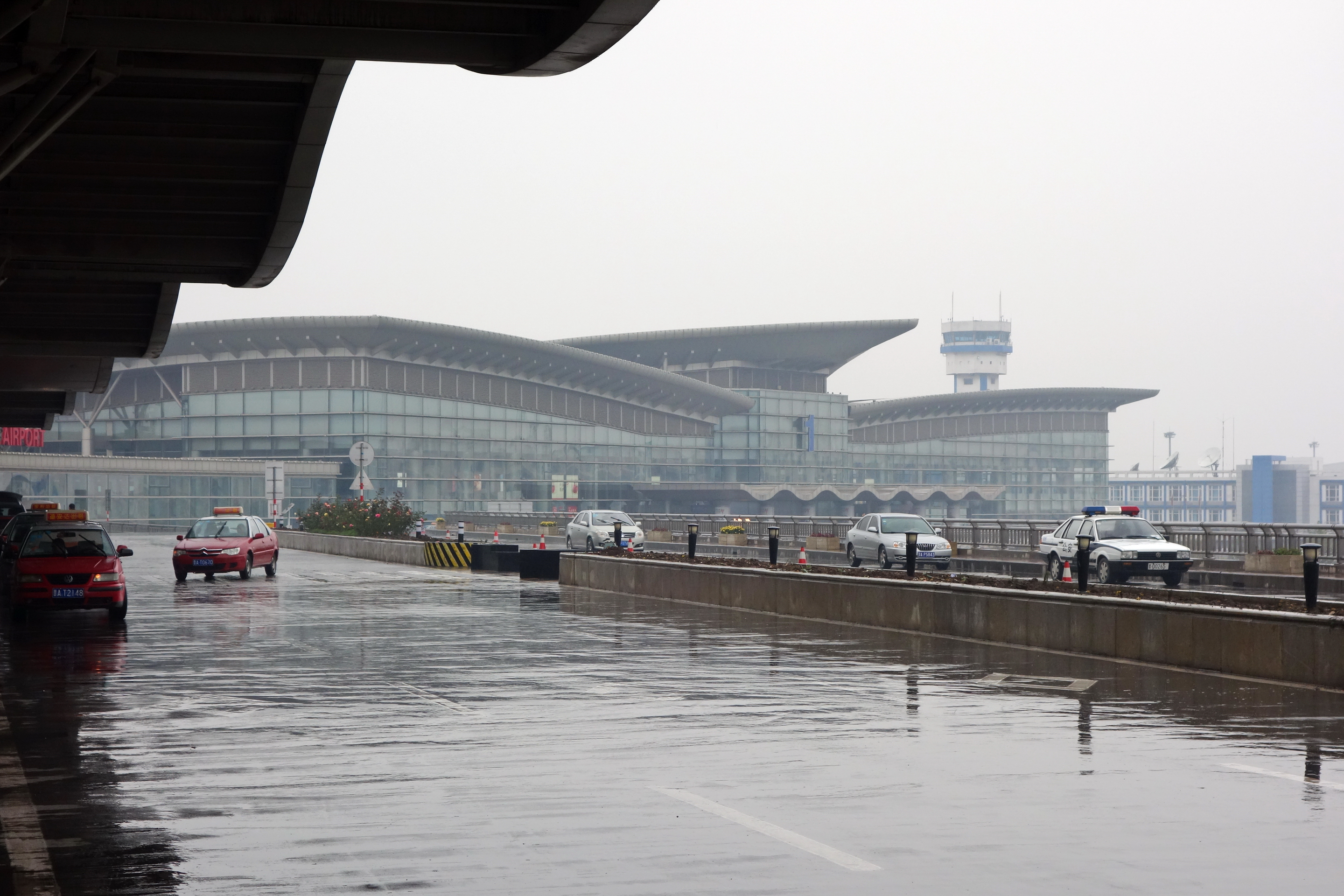
Taiyuan Wusu International Airport Terminal 1

Taiyuan Wusu International Airport	TYN	太原武宿国际机场
Datong Yungang International Airport	DAT	大同云冈国际机场
Yuncheng Yanchi International Airport	YCU	运城盐湖国际机场
Changzhi Wangcun Airport	CIH	长治王村机场
Xinzhou Wutaishan Airport	WUT	忻州五台山机场
Lüliang Dawu Airport	LLV	吕梁大武机场
Linfen Yaodu Airport	LFQ	临汾尧都机场
Shuozhou Zirun Airport	SZH	朔州滋润机场

== Demographics ==
The population is mostly Han Chinese with minorities of Mongol, Manchu, and the Hui.

Ethnic groups in Shanxi, 2000 census
Ethnic group	Population	Percentage
Han Chinese	32,368,083	99.68%
Hui	61,690	0.19%
Manchu	13,665	0.042%
Mongol	9,446	0.029%

In 2004, the birth rate was 12.36 births/1,000 population, while the death rate was 6.11 deaths/1,000 population. The sex ratio was 105.5 males/100 females.

=== Language ===
The language, Jin Chinese, spoken in Shanxi had traditionally been included in the Northern or Mandarin group. Since 1985, some linguists have argued that the dialects spoken in most of the province should be treated as a top-level division called Jin, based on its preservation of the medieval Chinese entering tone (stop-final) category and a large number of medieval Chinese vocabulary, unlike other dialects in northern China. These dialects are also noted for extremely complex tone sandhi systems. The dialects spoken in some areas in southwestern Shanxi near the borders with Henan and Shaanxi are classified in the Zhongyuan Mandarin subdivision of the Mandarin group.

=== Religion ===
Religion in Shanxi (Note: The data was collected by the Chinese General Social Survey (CGSS) of 2009 and by the Chinese Spiritual Life Survey (CSLS) of 2007, reported and assembled by Xiuhua Wang (2015) in order to confront the proportion of people identifying with two similar social structures: ① Christian churches, and ② the traditional Chinese religion of the lineage (i. e. people believing and worshipping ancestral deities often organised into lineage "churches" and ancestral shrines). Data for other religions with a significant presence in China (deity cults, Buddhism, Taoism, folk religious sects, Islam, et al.) was not reported by Wang.)
1. Chinese ancestral religion (15.6%)
2. Christianity (2.17%)
3. Other religions or not religious people (Note: This may include: Buddhists; Confucians; Deity worshippers; Taoists; Members of folk religious sects; Small minorities of Muslims; And people not bounded to, nor practicing any, institutional or diffuse religion.) (82.2%)

The predominant religions in Shanxi are Chinese folk religions, Taoist traditions and Chinese Buddhism. According to surveys conducted in 2007 and 2009, 15.61% of the population believes and is involved in cults of ancestors, while 2.17% of the population identifies as Christian. The reports do not give figures for other religious groups: 82.22% of the population may be either irreligious or involved in worship of nature deities, Buddhism, Confucianism, Taoism, folk religious sects, and small minorities of Muslims.

Military police demolished a large Christian church known as Jindengtai ("Golden Lampstand") in Linfen, Shanxi, in early January 2018.

As of 2010, there were 59,709 Muslims in Shanxi.

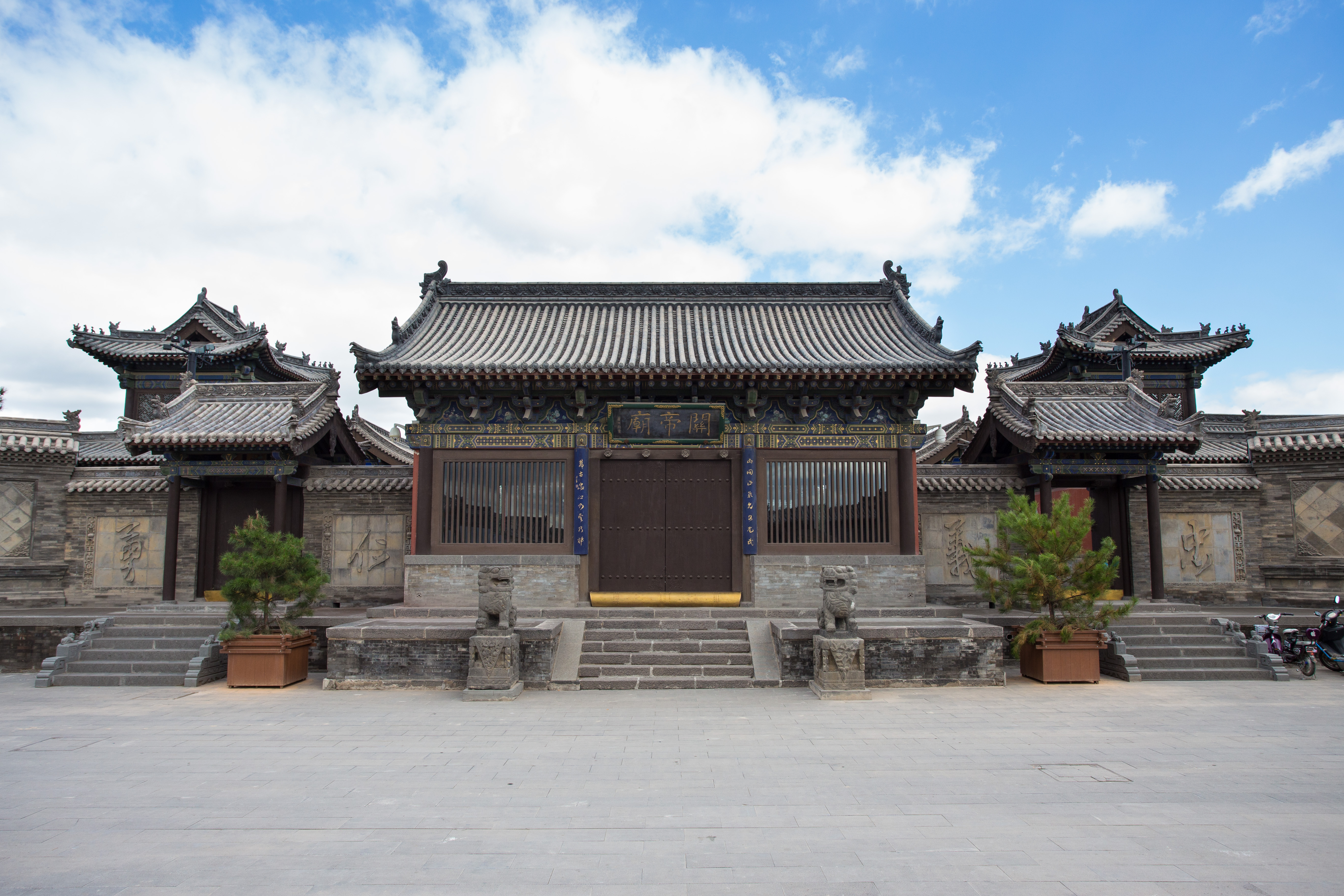
Temple of Guandi in Datong.

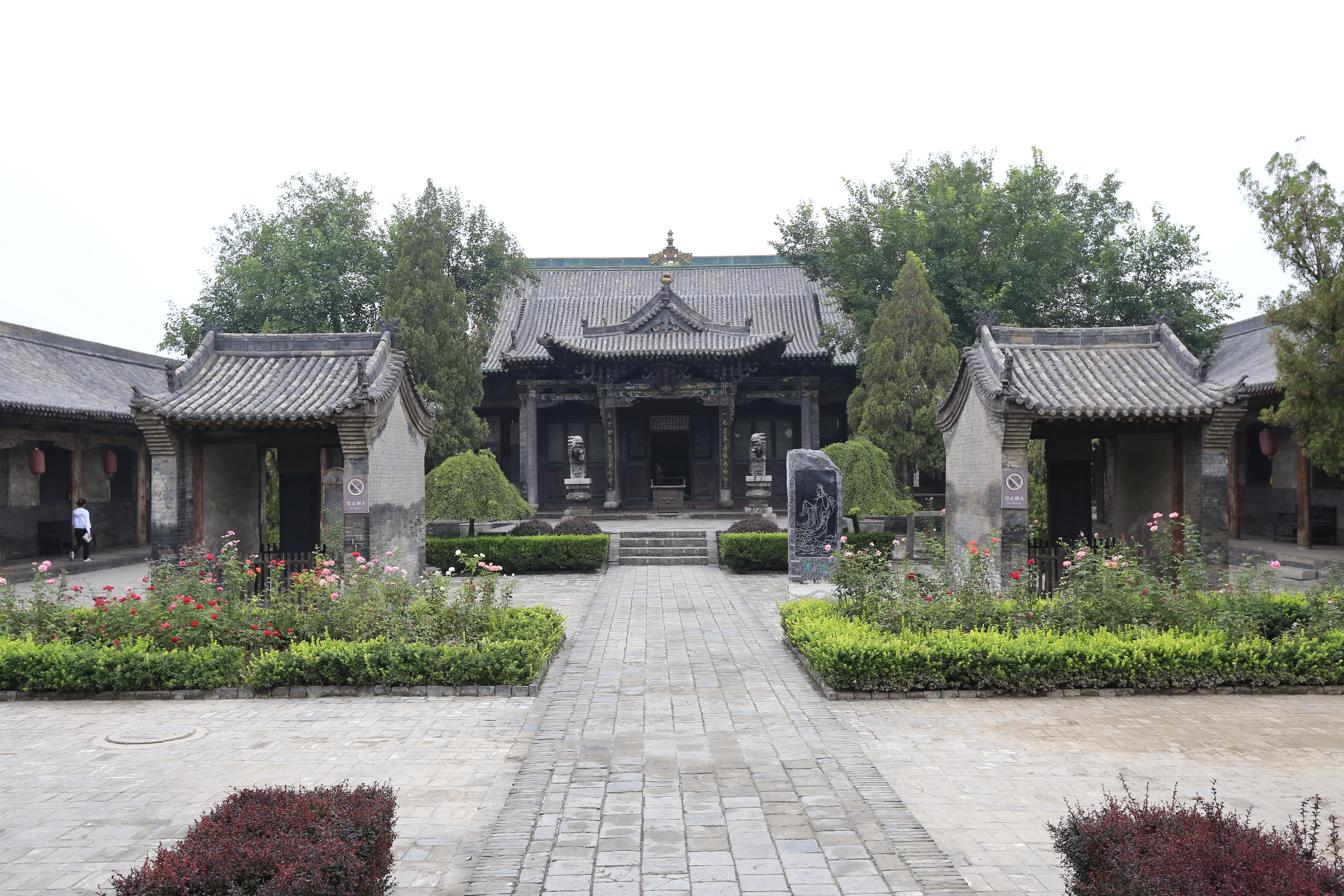
Qingxu Guan in Pingyao, a Daoist religious complex.

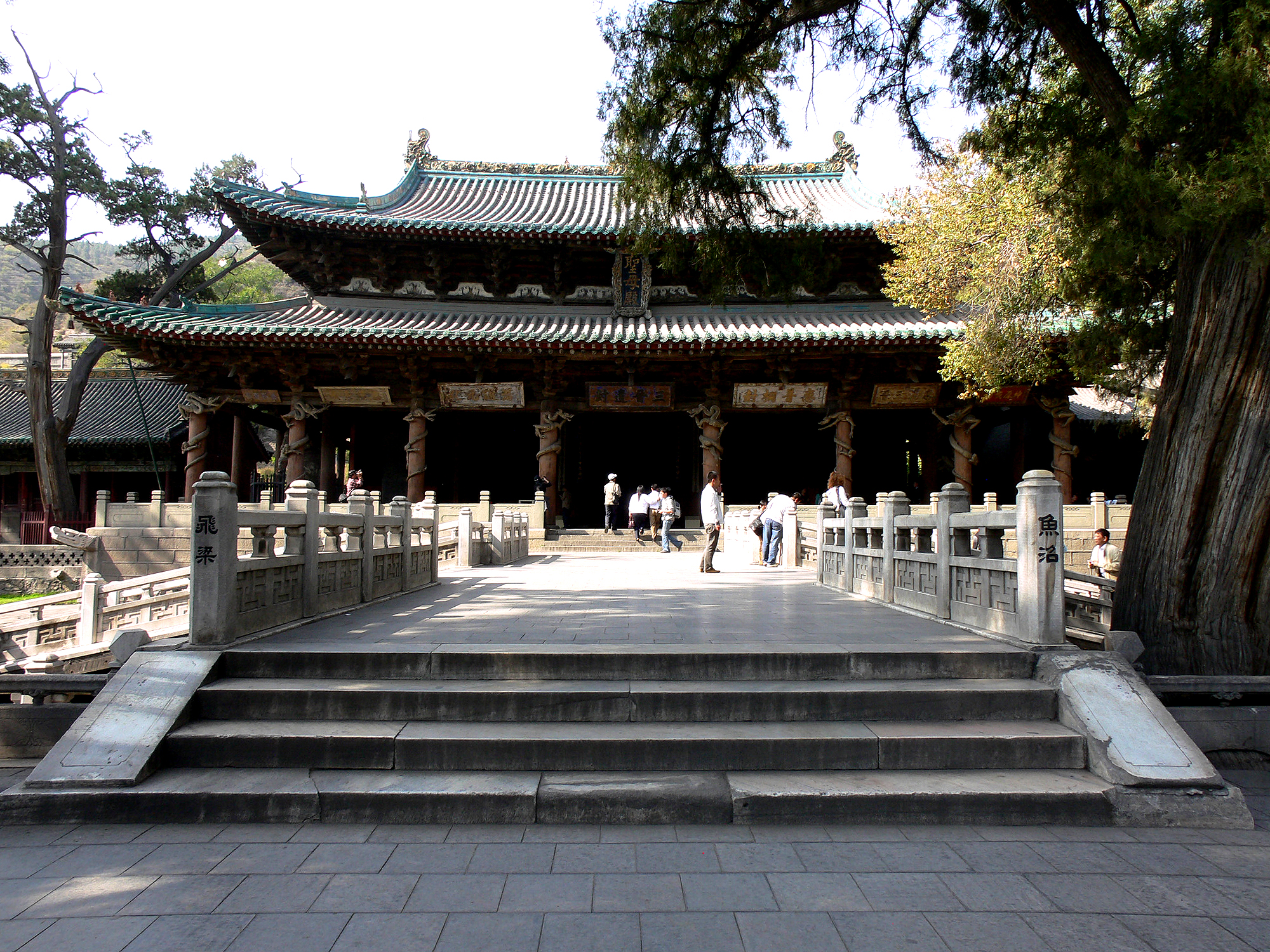
Shengmu Temple at Jinci in Jinyuan, Taiyuan

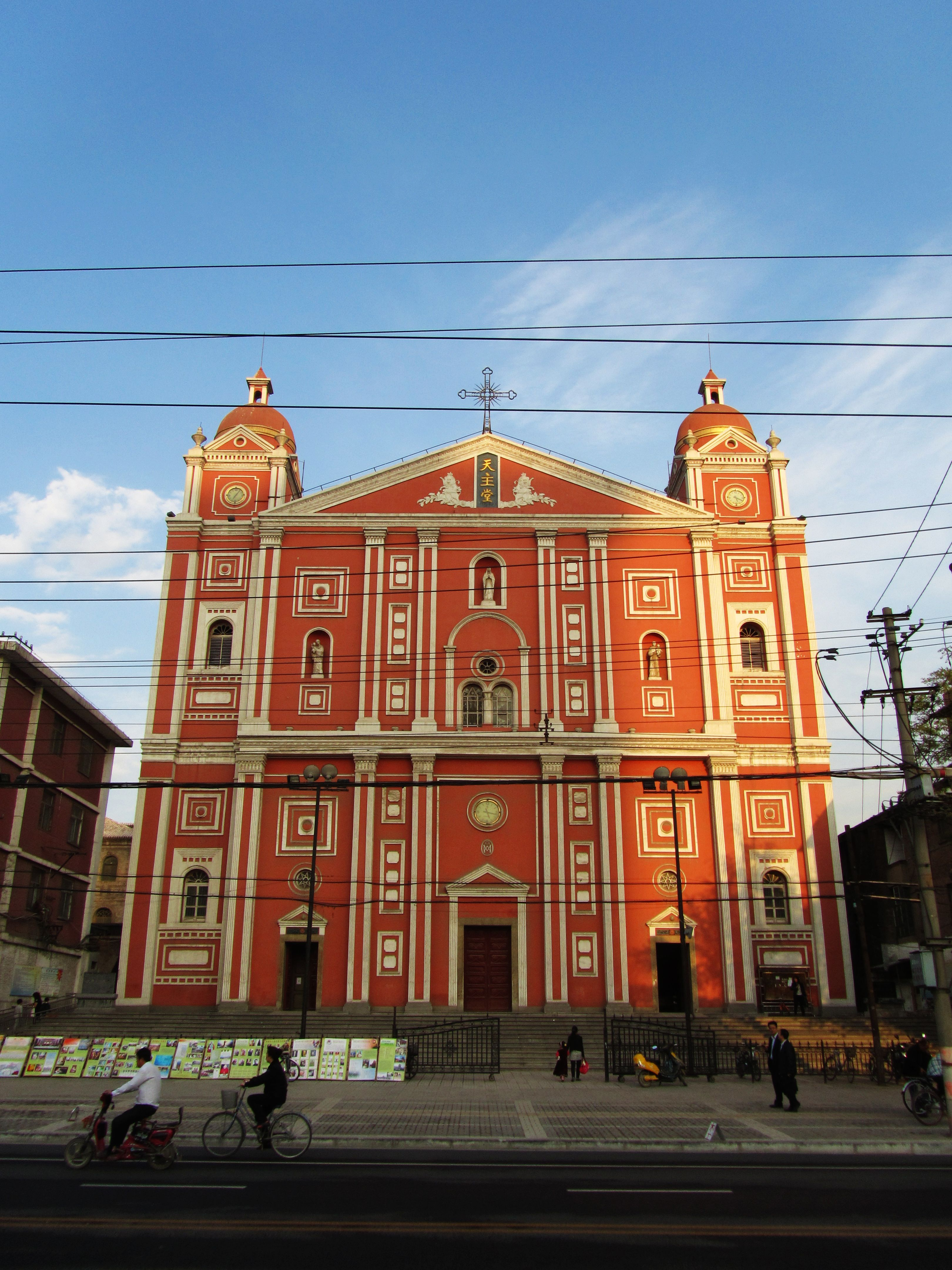
Cathedral of the Immaculate Conception in Taiyuan

== Administration ==
Shanxi is divided into eleven prefecture-level divisions: all prefecture-level cities:

Administrative divisions of Shanxi
Division code	Division	Area in km^{2}	Population 2010	Seat	Divisions		
Division code	Division	Area in km^{2}	Population 2010	Seat	Districts	Counties	CL cities
140000	Shanxi Province	156,000.00	35,712,111	Taiyuan city	26	80	11
140100	Taiyuan city	6,909.96	4,201,591	Xinghualing District	6	3	1
140200	Datong city	14,102.01	3,318,057	Pingcheng District	4	6	
140300	Yangquan city	4,569.91	1,368,502	Cheng District	3	2	
140400	Changzhi city	13,957.84	3,334,564	Luzhou District	4	8	
140500	Jincheng city	9,420.43	2,279,151	Cheng District	1	4	1
140600	Shuozhou city	10,624.35	1,714,857	Shuocheng District	2	3	1
140700	Jinzhong city	16,386.34	3,249,425	Yuci District	2	8	1
140800	Yuncheng city	14,106.66	5,134,794	Yanhu District	1	10	2
140900	Xinzhou city	25,150.69	3,067,501	Xinfu District	1	12	1
141000	Linfen city	20,589.11	4,316,612	Yaodu District	1	14	2
141100	Lüliang city	21,143.71	3,727,057	Lishi District	1	10	2

Administrative divisions in Chinese and varieties of romanizations
English	Chinese	Pinyin	Jin Romanization
Shanxi Province	山西省	Shānxī Shěng	sä̃1 śi1 sǝŋ2
Taiyuan city	太原市	Tàiyuán Shì	thai3 yɛ1 si3
Datong city	大同市	Dàtóng Shì	ta3 thuŋ1 si3
Yangquan city	阳泉市	Yángquán Shì	iã1 ćhyɛ1 si3
Changzhi city	长治市	Chángzhì Shì	cã2 ci3 si3
Jincheng city	晋城市	Jìnchéng Shì	tieŋ4 chǝŋ1 si3
Shuozhou city	朔州市	Shuòzhōu Shì	? cou1 si3
Jinzhong city	晋中市	Jìnzhōng Shì	tieŋ4 cuŋ1 si3
Yuncheng city	运城市	Yùnchéng Shì	yŋ3 chǝŋ1 si3
Xinzhou city	忻州市	Xīnzhōu Shì	? cou1 si3
Linfen city	临汾市	Línfén Shì	? ? si3
Lüliang city	吕梁市	Lǚliáng Shì	ly2 ? si3

The 11 prefecture-level cities of Shanxi are subdivided into 118 county-level divisions (23 districts, 11 county-level cities, and 84 counties). Those are in turn divided into 1388 township-level divisions (561 towns, 634 townships, and 193 subdistricts). At the end of 2017, the total population of Shanxi is 37.02 million.

Population by urban areas of prefecture & county cities
#	Cities	2020 Urban area	2010 Urban area	2020 City proper
1	Taiyuan	4,071,075	3,154,157	5,304,061
2	Datong	1,792,696	1,362,314 (Note: New district established after 2010 census: Yunzhou (Datong County). The new district not included in the urban area count of the pre-expanded city.)	3,105,591
3	Changzhi	1,168,042	653,125 (Note: New districts established after 2010 census: Lucheng (Lucheng CLC), Shangdang (Changzhi County), Tunliu (Tunliu County). These new districts not included in the urban area count of the pre-expanded city.)	3,180,884
4	Jinzhong	900,569	444,002 (Note: New district established after 2010 census: Taigu (Taigu County). The new district not included in the urban area count of the pre-expanded city.)	3,379,498
5	Linfen	696,393	571,237	3,976,481
6	Yuncheng	692,003	432,554	4,774,508
7	Yangquan	647,272	623,671	1,318,505
8	Jincheng	574,665	476,945	2,194,545
9	Shuozhou	420,829	381,566	1,593,444
10	Xinzhou	384,424	279,875	2,689,668
11	Xiaoyi	337,489	268,253	see Lüliang
12	Lüliang	335,285	250,080	3,398,431
13	Jiexiu	291,393	232,269	see Jinzhong
14	Huairen	247,612	(Note: Huairen County is currently known as Huairen CLC after 2010 census.)	see Shuozhou
15	Gaoping	243,544	213,460	see Jincheng
16	Yuanping	227,046	202,562	see Xinzhou
17	Hejin	225,809	175,824	see Yuncheng
18	Fenyang	207,473	149,222	see Lüliang
19	Huozhou	183,575	156,853	see Linfen
20	Yongji	182,248	179,028	see Yuncheng
21	Houma	175,373	137,020	see Linfen
22	Gujiao	159,593	146,161	see Taiyuan
—	Lucheng	see Changzhi	106,077	see Changzhi

== Culture ==
=== Art ===
Shanxi retains substantial bodies of work in bronze, sculpture, mural painting, and colored glaze, much of it still in situ, with sculptures and murals surviving in the temple spaces for which they were made. The province preserves over 12,000 polychrome sculptures dating from the Tang dynasty onward and more than 50,000 square meters of murals, both totals the highest of any Chinese province.

From the medieval period onward, polychrome clay sculpture became a central artistic form in Shanxi. Figures were built over wooden armatures through successive clay layers, with thick mineral pigments applied to distinguish flesh from drapery—skin often gilded or left pale, robes painted in dense reds, greens, and blues. A technique widespread across the region involved setting black glazed ceramic or glass into the eye sockets, producing a wet gleam that animates faces in dim temple interiors.

The expressive range of Shanxi sculpture extends well beyond hieratic calm. Guardian figures twist at the waist with clenched fists and furrowed brows; demons underfoot contort in exaggerated grimaces; bodhisattvas tilt their heads in gestures of attentive compassion. Attendant figures across many temple complexes display subtle asymmetries in posture and gaze, suggesting distinct personalities rather than formulaic repetition. Spatial staging further heightens dramatic effect. Suspended figures emerge from upper walls on cloud-borne platforms, their downward gazes engaging the central icons below. Arhat groupings are arranged so that gestures and sightlines interlock, generating narrative tension across the room. These compositional strategies appear throughout the region's temples, from major monastic complexes to village shrines.

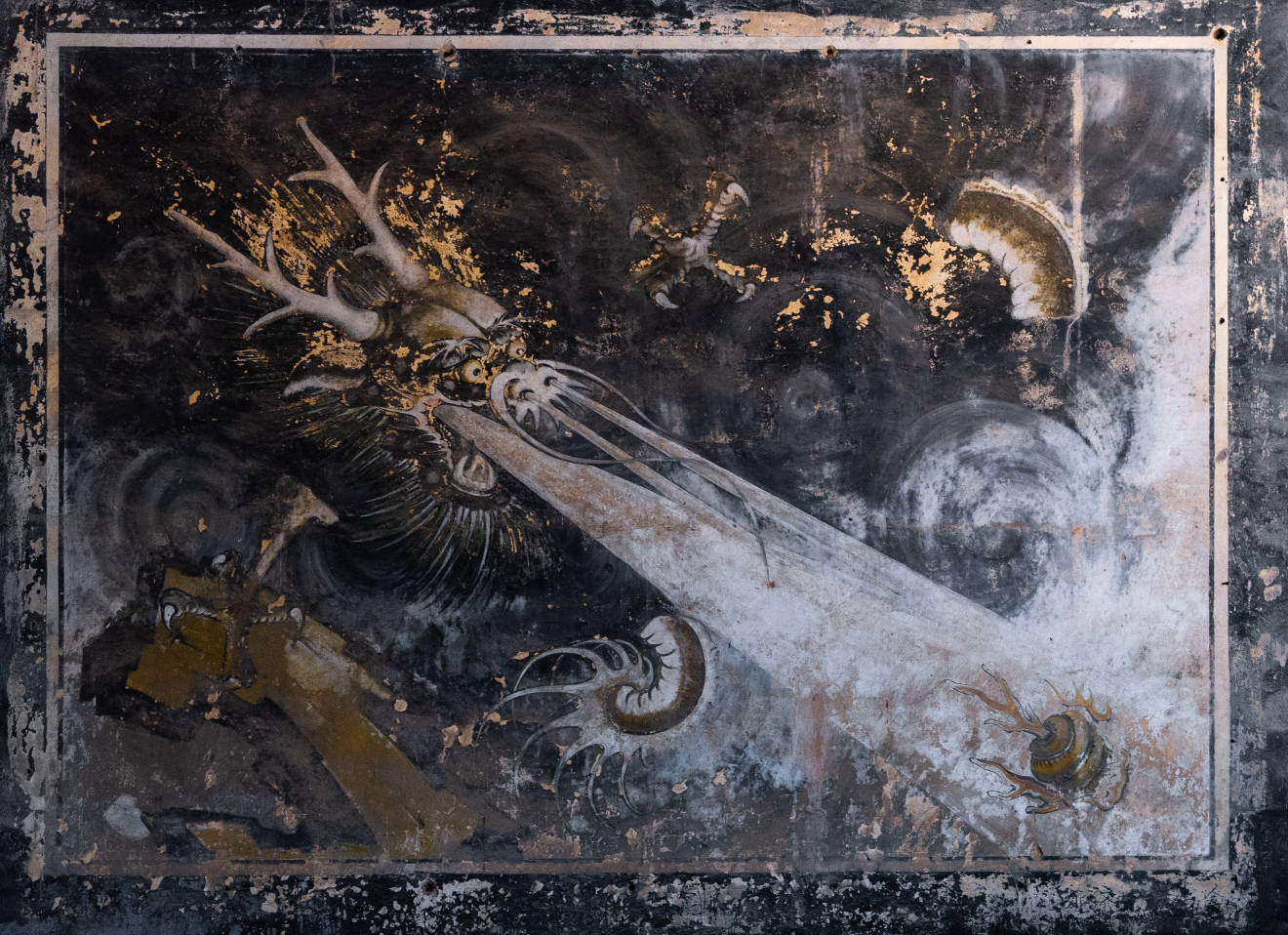
Mural painting at the Guandi Temple in Yuncheng, 15th–16th centuries CE.

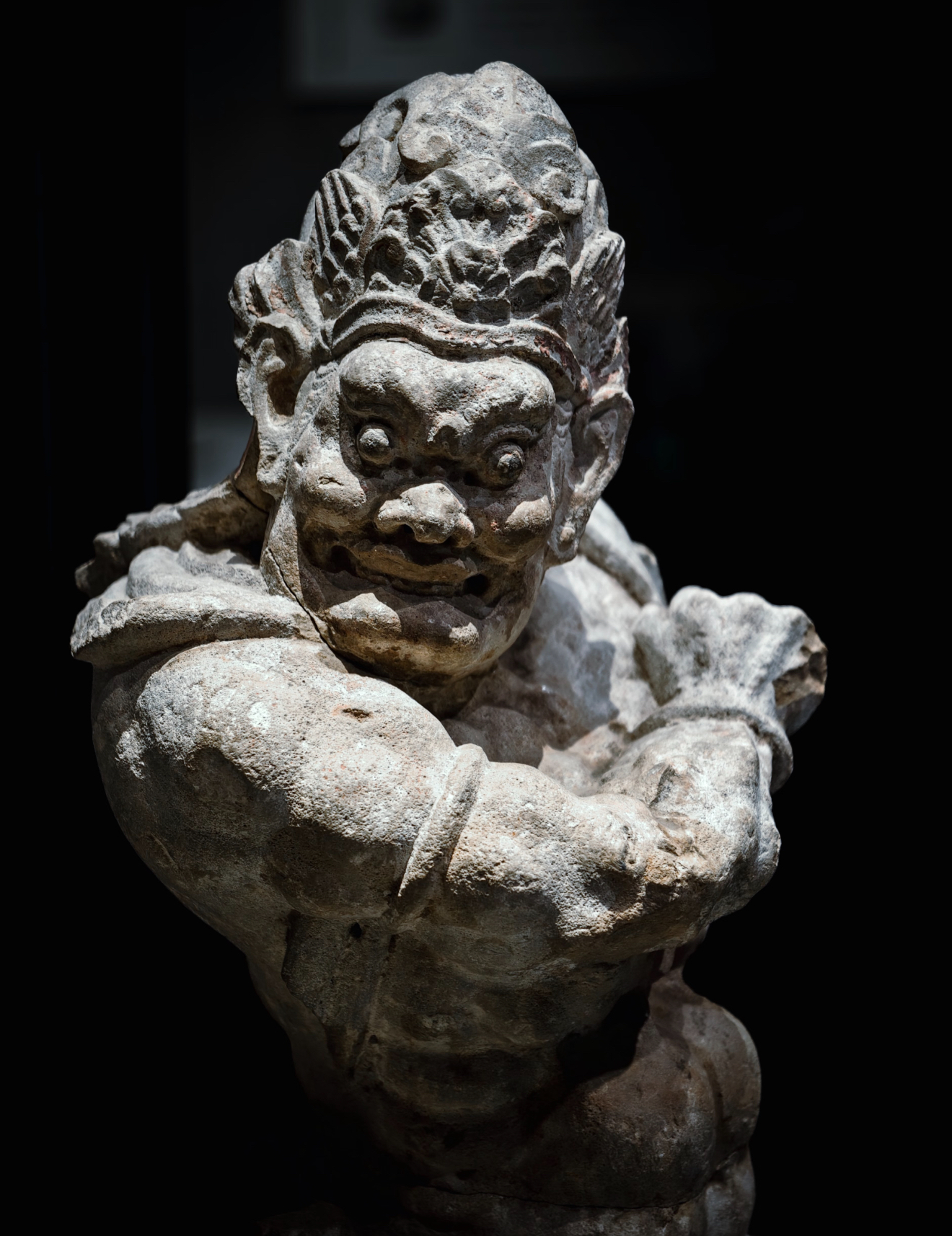
Stone sculpture of a guardian figure, 7th–8th centuries CE, Datong Museum.

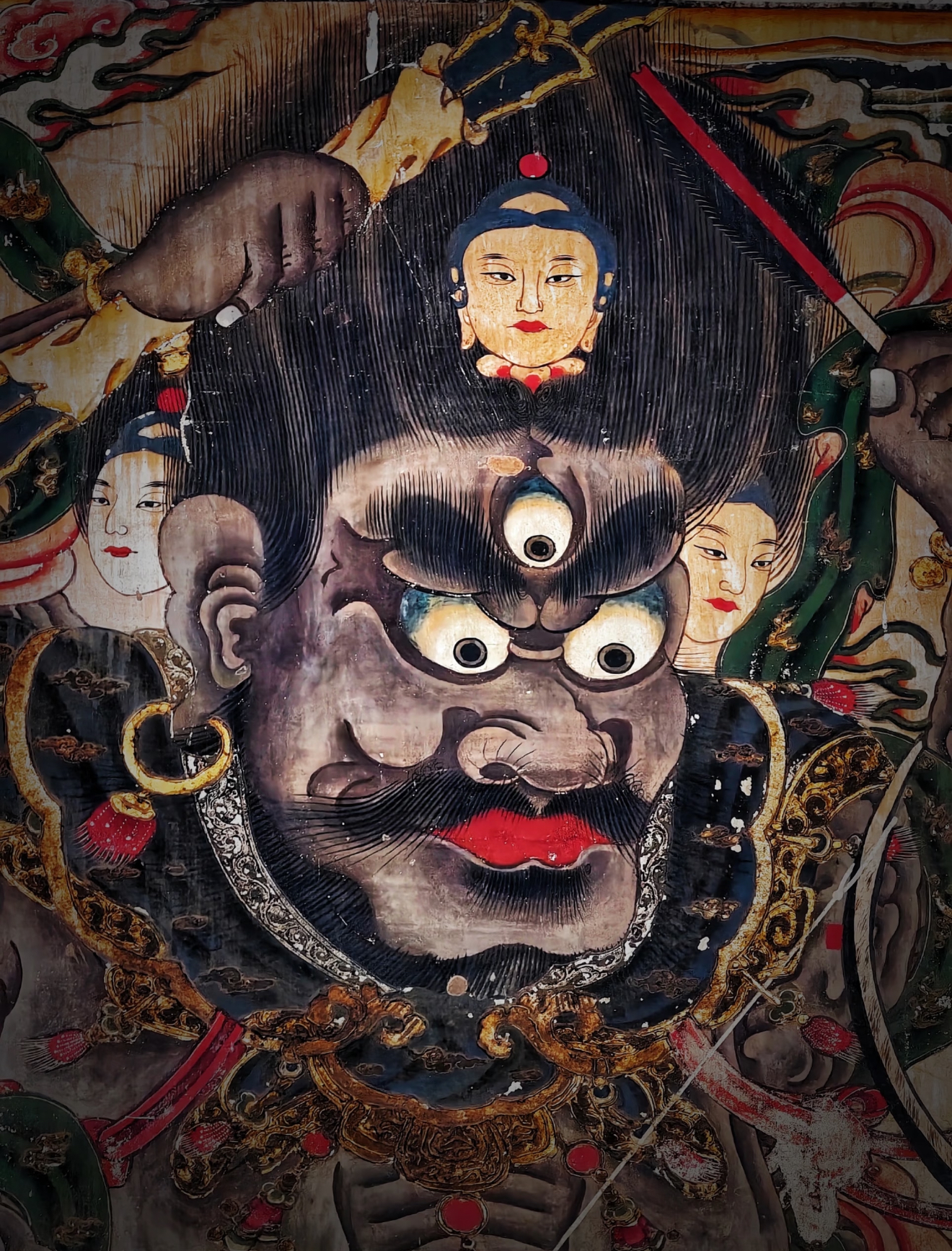
Mural depicting Yamāntaka, a Wisdom King at Yong'an Chan Temple, Hunyuan, 14th–15th centuries CE.

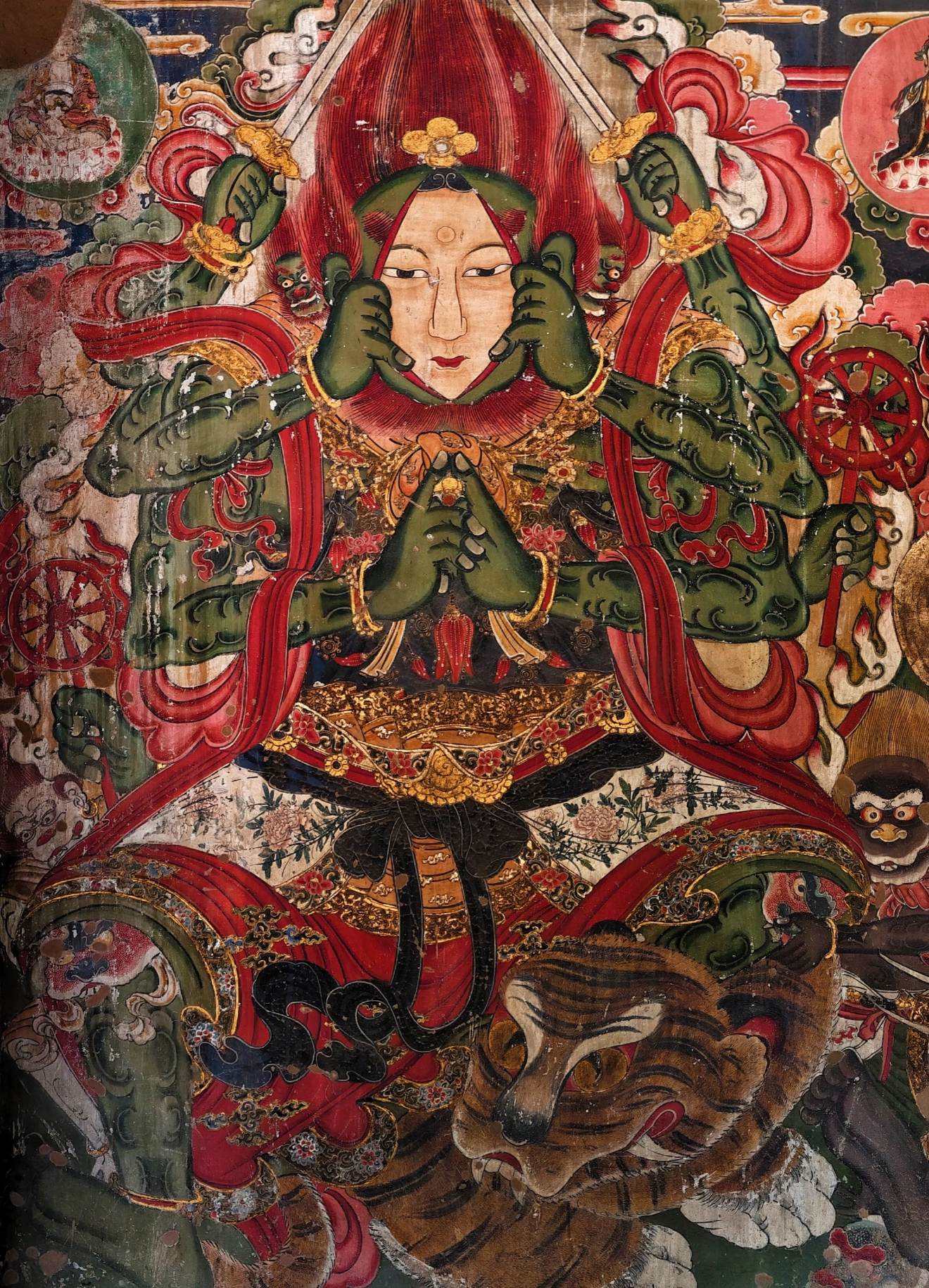
Mural depicting Acala, a Wisdom King at Yong'an Chan Temple, Hunyuan, 14th–15th centuries CE.

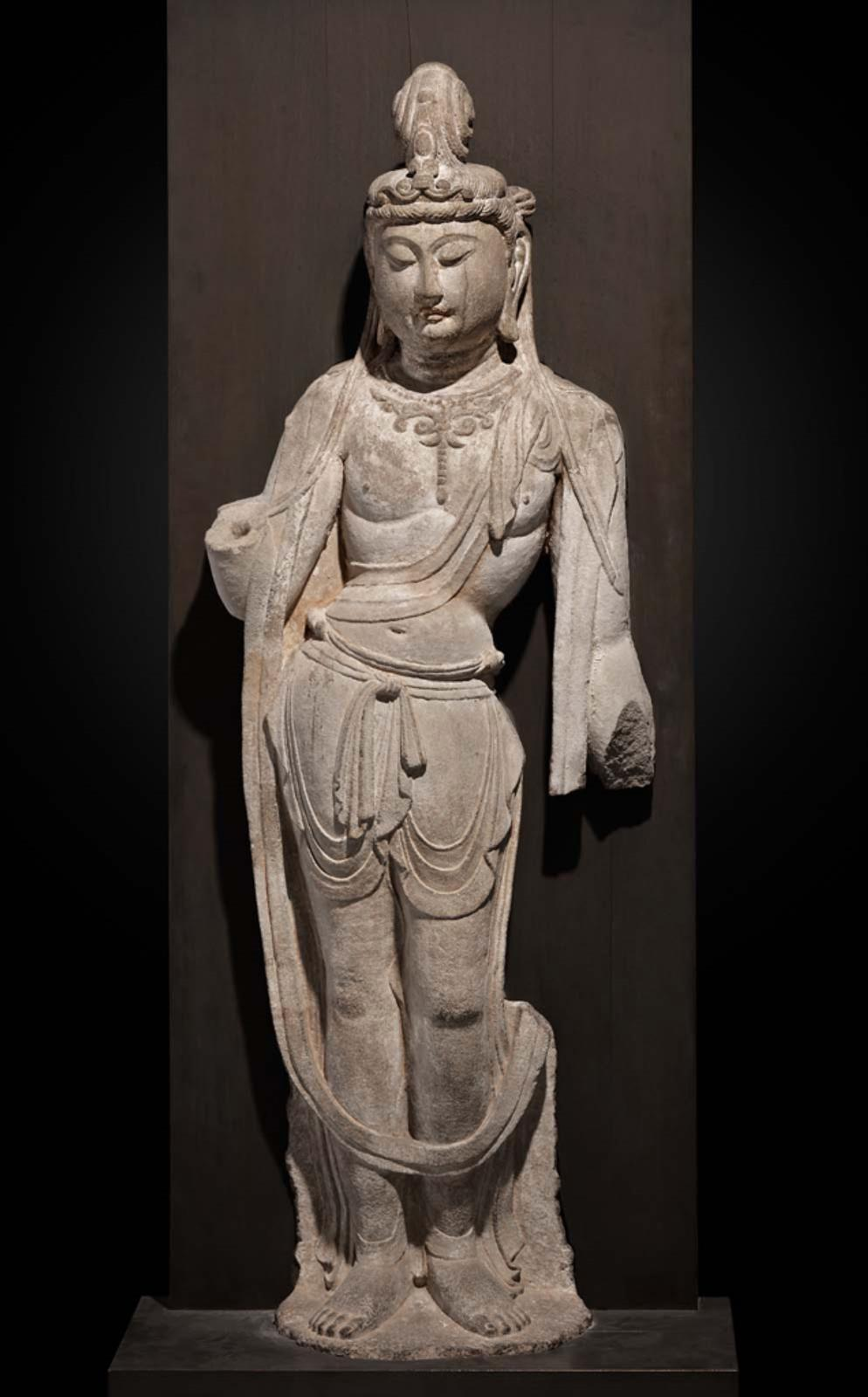
Bodhisattva, Tang dynasty (618–907), from Tianlongshan Grottoes, Shanxi Province, China. Museum of Fine Arts, Boston.

=== Architecture ===
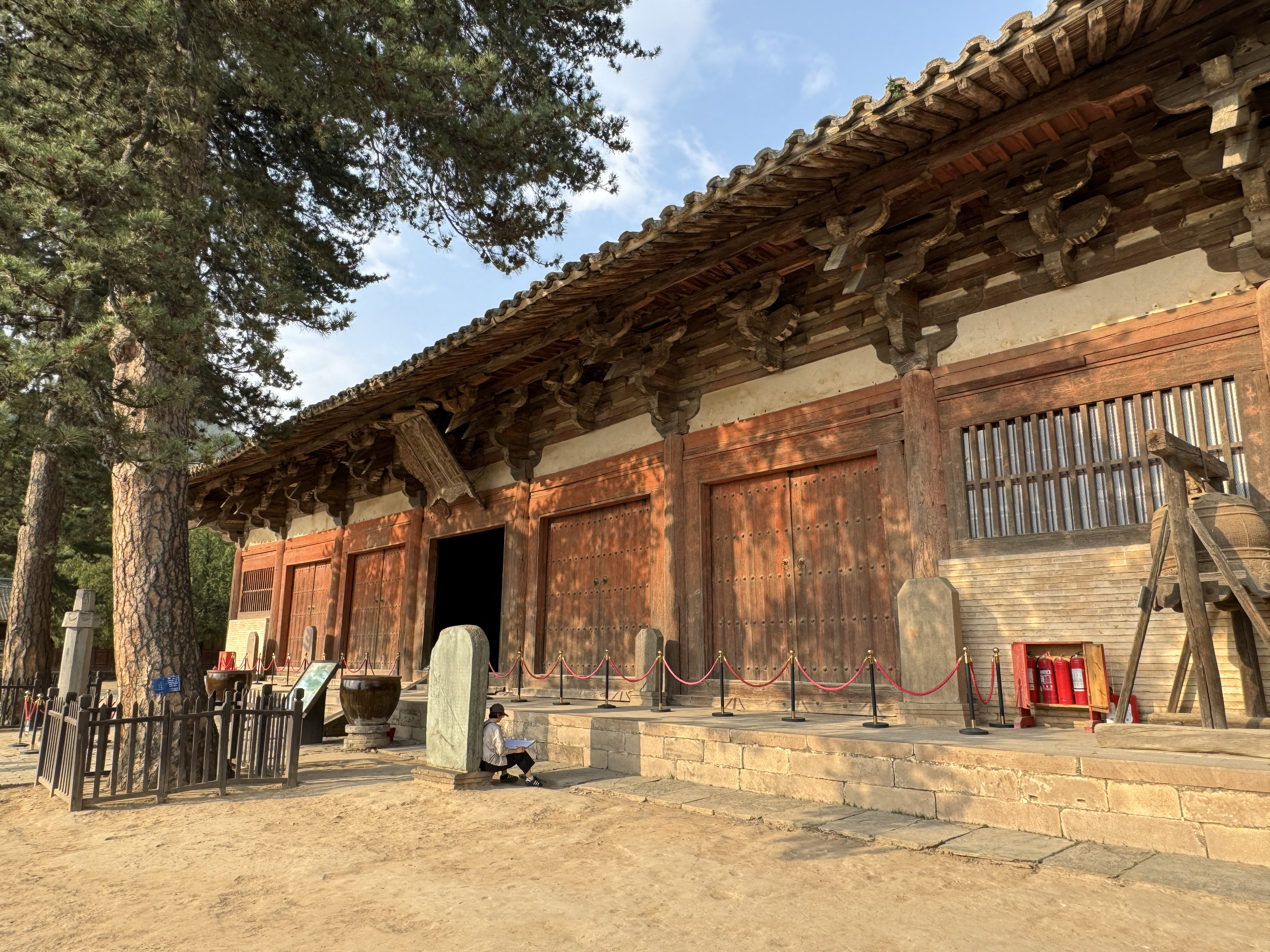
The East Main Hall of Foguang Temple

According to official cultural heritage records, Shanxi currently has 53,875 registered immovable cultural heritage sites, of which 28,027 are historic buildings. Shanxi has 531 sites designated as National Key Cultural Relics Protection Units, the highest number among all provincial-level regions in China, including 421 historic buildings. These sites encompass major traditions of architectural construction, stone and clay sculpture, and religious wall painting.

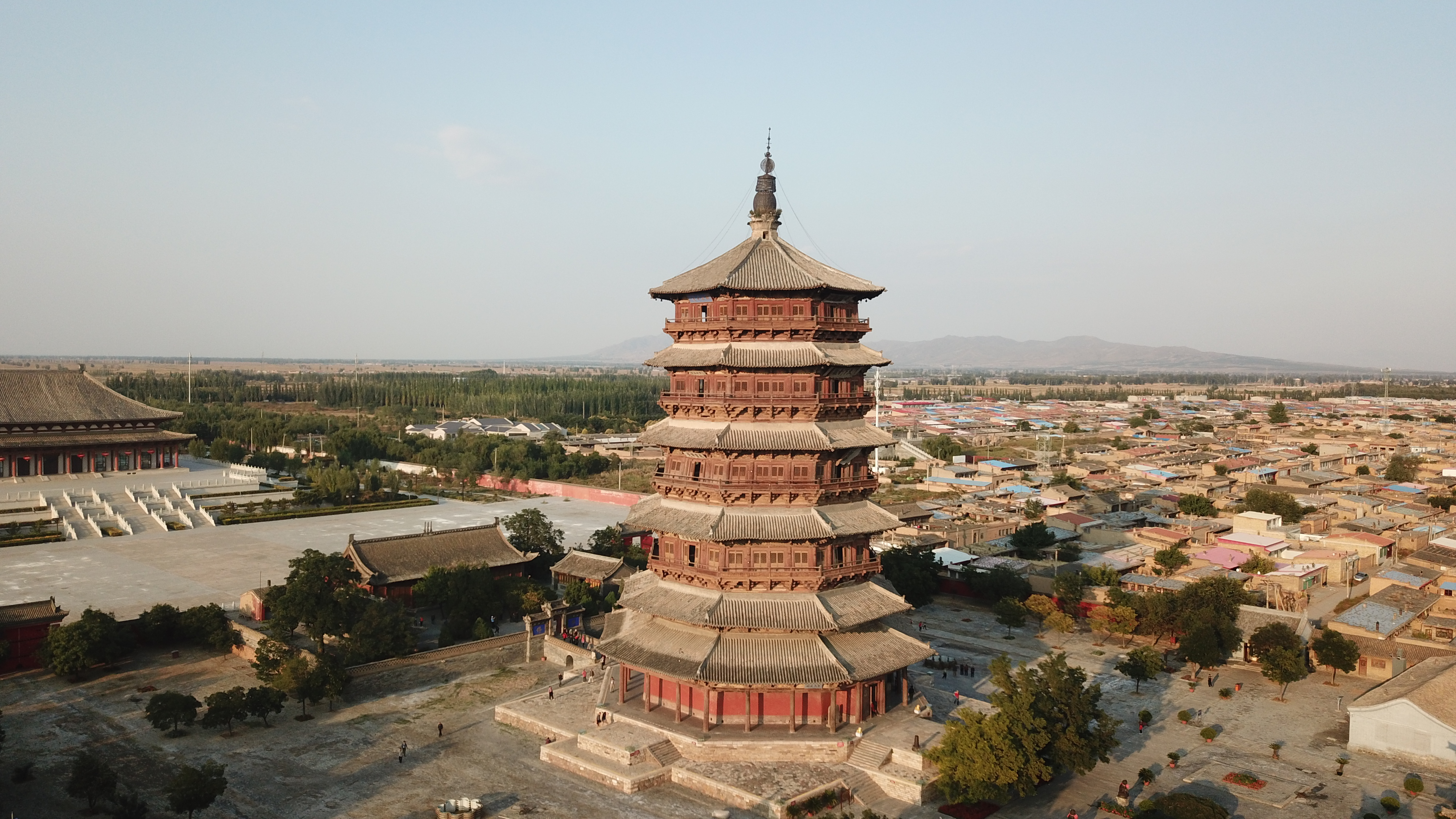
Pagoda of Fogong Temple, the oldest wooden multi-storey structure of the world.

In the field of early timber architecture, Shanxi preserves 495 surviving wooden structures dating to periods before the Yuan dynasty, representing approximately 85 percent of China's known extant examples. All three Tang dynasty timber buildings traditionally recognized in architectural scholarship, the main hall of Nanchan Temple, the East Main Hall of Foguang Temple, and the main hall of Guangrenwang Temple, are located in Shanxi.

The province further preserves four of the five surviving timber structures from the Five Dynasties period nationwide, as well as 150 of the 183 extant wooden buildings from the Song, Liao, and Jin periods, and 338 of the 389 known examples from the Yuan dynasty.

=== Literature and cinema ===
Cultural production associated with Shanxi is often read through the province's topography of enclosure, the Taihang and Lüliang ranges, the loess highlands, and the ravines and basins that make movement feel difficult even when the map says "near." In that sense, Shanxi is not geographically remote from political and cultural centers (it sits close to the North China Plain and long interacted with Beijing–Hebei worlds), but its terrain has historically encouraged a different kind of distance: a narrowing of everyday horizons, a sense of bounded lifeworlds, and a strong continuity of local habits and memory.

Across periods and media, Shanxi-linked writing and film repeatedly return to endurance under constraint, abrupt historical rupture, and the limits of individual agency. Instead of treating "resolution" as the natural endpoint, these works often linger on what remains after upheaval: routine, scars, half-preserved loyalties, and the slow moral and emotional afterlife of political change. The result is a tonal emphasis on duration: history not as a sequence of clean turns, but as a weight that settles unevenly across places and people on the land.

In premodern literature, this tendency is often exemplified by Yuan Haowen (1190–1257), whose poetry and ci lyrics repeatedly meditate on the reversals of fortune that attend dynastic change and personal loss. In vernacular modern fiction, a related sensibility surfaces in Zhao Shuli, whose village-centered narratives render historical change not as abstraction but as the slow, frictional reworking of everyday norms: marriage, authority, reputation, and the stubborn inertia of habit. In modern cultural production, comparable preoccupations recur in the cinema of Jia Zhangke, which is widely noted for its attention to temporal dislocation and social transformation in northern Chinese settings, and in the science fiction of Liu Cixin, where questions of choice and responsibility are posed against scales that exceed the human, within very different genres, as illustrating a strand of cultural expression associated with Shanxi that foregrounds fate, duration, and the uneven weight of history.

=== Opera ===
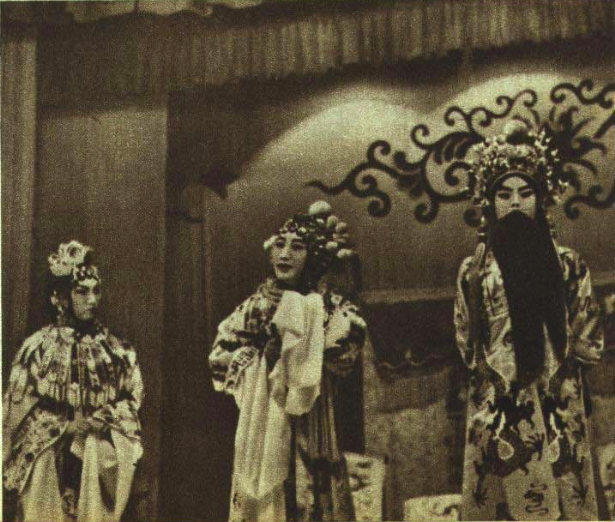
Beating the Golden Branch (打金枝), a Shanxi Opera performance, 1952

Shanxi Opera (晋剧 Jinju) is the local form of Chinese opera. It was popularized during the late Qing dynasty, with the help of the then-ubiquitous Shanxi merchants who were active across parts of China. Also called Zhonglu Bangzi (中路梆子), it is a type of bangzi opera (梆子), a group of operas generally distinguished by their use of wooden clappers for rhythm and by a more energetic singing style; Shanxi opera is also complemented by quzi (曲子), a blanket term for more melodic styles from further south. Puzhou Opera (蒲剧 Puju), from southern Shanxi, is a more ancient type of bangzi that makes use of very wide linear intervals.

=== Cuisine ===
Shanxi cuisine is most well known for its extensive use of vinegar as a condiment, as well as for a huge variety of noodle dishes, particularly knife-cut noodles or daoxiao mian (刀削面), which are served with a range of sauces. A dish originating from Taiyuan, the provincial capital, is Taiyuan Tounao (Chinese: 太原头脑; lit. 'Taiyuan Head'). It is a breakfast dish; a porridge-like stew made with mutton, Chinese yam (山药), lotus roots, astragalus membranaceus (黄芪; 'membranous milk vetch'), tuber onions, and yellow cooking wine for additional aroma. It can be enjoyed by dipping pieces of unleavened flatbread into the soup, and is reputed to have medicinal properties. Pingyao is famous for its unique salt beef, while the areas around Wutai Shan are known for wild mushrooms. The most popular local spirit is fenjiu, a "light fragrance" variety of baijiu that is generally sweeter than other northern Chinese spirits.

== Notable people ==
=== Modern and contemporary ===
==== The Republic of China ====
- Zhao Daiwen 赵戴文 (1866–1943), the Minister of the Interior and Supervisory Yuan of the Republic of China
- H. H. Kung (1881–1967), the Premier and Minister of Finance of the Republic of China
- Yan Xishan (1883–1960), the Premier and Acting President of the Republic of China
- Xu Yongchang (1885–1959), the Minister of War of the Republic of China and Commander-in-Chief of the National Revolutionary Army
- Li Chengci 李承慈 (1891–1969), the Vice President of the Republic of China and a first-class general of the National Revolutionary Army
- Fu Zuoyi (1895–1974), military general of the Republic of China best known for negotiating the peaceful surrender of Beijing in 1949
- Jia Jingde 贾景德 (1896–1983), the Minister of the Examination Yuan of the Republic of China
- Shi Pingmei (1902–1928), writer
- Hu Boyue 胡伯岳 (1905–1993), Justice of the Republic of China
- Chih Kung Jen (1906–1995), physicist
- Min Chueh Chang (1908–1991), biologist
- Yang Bing-yi (1927–2023), the founder of Din Tai Fung
- Chang An-lo (1948–), an ultranationalist, organized crime figure, entrepreneur, and politician in Taiwan

===== Taiwan-born children of Shanxi parents after 1949 =====
- Terry Gou (1950–), founder and former chairman and chief executive officer (CEO) of Foxconn
- Sylvia Chang (1953–), actress whose performances have been widely recognized at major international film festivals
- Chang Ya-chung (1954–), politician and political scientist

==== The People's Republic of China ====
- Kang Sheng (1898–1975), senior CCP official and the head of intelligence and security apparatus during the Mao era
- Xu Xiangqian (1901–1990), senior CCP military commander and one of the Ten Marshals of the People's Liberation Army
- Zhao Shuli (1906–1970), a writer whose works shaped modern rural literature and socialist realism in North China
- Bo Yibo (1908–2007), Vice Premier of the State Council of the People's Republic of China, one of the Eight Immortals of the CCP
- Chen Yonggui (1914–1986), Vice Premier of the People's Republic of China during the Cultural Revolution
- Hua Guofeng (1921–2008), Chairman of the CCP and Premier of the People's Republic of China
- Chao-Li Chi (1927–2010), Chinese-American actor and dancer
- Ji Chaozhu (1929–2020), Under-secretary General of the United Nations
- Bo Xilai (1949–), a politician who served as Minister of Commerce and as Party Secretary of Chongqing
- Ling Jihua (1956–), Director of the General Office of the CCP and was a key political aide to Hu Jintao
- Gu Kailai (1958–), a lawyer and businesswoman, wife of Bo Xilai
- Liu Wang (1958–), astronaut
- Jing Haipeng (1966–), astronaut
- Jia Zhangke (1970–), film director whose works have won major international awards
- Li Bingbing (1973–), actress and producer who has appeared in major international film productions
- Chai Jing (1976–), investigative journalist and television host, widely known for her work in Chinese broadcast journalism and public-interest reporting
- Zhao Tao (1977–), actress whose performances in independent cinema have been widely recognized at major international film festivals
- Tan Jing (1977–), solo singer in the CPC Central Military Commission Political Department Song and Dance Troupe

=== Ancient and medieval ===
- Boyi and Shuqi (just after 1046 BCE), starved themselves in self-imposed exile
- King Wuling of Zhao (325 BCE-299 BCE), ruler of State of Zhao during the Warring States period
- Wei Qing (?–106 BC), military general of the Western Han dynasty whose campaigns against the Xiongnu earned him great acclaim
- Huo Qubing (140 BC–117 BC), military general of the Western Han dynasty during the reign of Emperor Wu of Han
- Huo Guang (?–68 BC), powerful official of the Western Han dynasty
- Guan Yu (?－220), general serving under Liu Bei during the late Eastern Han dynasty who was known for his superior martial prowess on the battlefield
- Zhang Liao (169–222), general serving under Cao Cao in the late Eastern Han dynasty who was known for his superior martial prowess on the battlefield
- Xu Huang (?–227), general serving under Cao Cao in the late Eastern Han dynasty
- Hao Zhao (220–229), general of the state of Cao Wei during the Three Kingdoms period of China
- Guo Huai (?–255), general of the state of Cao Wei during the Three Kingdoms period of China
- Guanqiu Jian (?–255), general of the state of Cao Wei during the Three Kingdoms period of China
- Qin Lang (227–238), general of the state of Cao Wei during the Three Kingdoms period of China
- Jia Chong (217–282), official who lived during the late Three Kingdoms period and early Jin dynasty of China
- Liu Yuan (?–310), the founding emperor of the Xiongnu state Han-Zhao in 308
- Liu Cong (?–318), emperor of the Xiongnu state Han-Zhao
- Liu Yao (?–329), the final emperor of the Xiongnu state Han-Zhao
- Shi Le (274–333), the founding emperor of the Jie state Later Zhao
- Shi Hu (295–349), emperor of the Jie state Later Zhao, he was the founding emperor Shi Le's distant nephew
- Murong Yong (?–394), the last emperor of the Xianbei state Western Yan
- Wang Sengbian (?–394), general of the Liang dynasty
- Tuoba Gui (371–409), founding emperor of the Xianbei state Northern Wei
- Tuoba Tao (408–452), an emperor of Xianbei state Northern Wei
- Erzhu Rong (493–530), general of the Chinese/Xianbei dynasty Northern Wei, He was of Xiongnu ancestry
- Erzhu Zhao (493–530), general of the Northern Wei, He was ethnically Xiongnu and a nephew of the paramount general Erzhu Rong
- Hulü Guang (515–572), general of the Chinese dynasty Northern Qi
- Dugu Xin (503–557), a paramount general of the state Western Wei
- Yuchi Jiong (?–580), a paramount general of the states Western Wei and Northern Zhou
- Yuchi Jingde (585–658), general who lived in the early Tang dynasty and is worshipped as door god in Chinese folk religion
- Wang Tong (587–618), Confucian philosopher and writer
- Xue Ju (?–618), the founding emperor of a short-lived state of Qin at the end of the Chinese dynasty Sui dynasty
- Pei Xingyan (?–619), general in Sui dynasty who was known for his superior fighting skills on the battlefield
- Xue Rengui (614–683), general in Tang dynasty who was known for his superior martial prowess on the battlefield
- Pei Xingjian (619–682), a Tang dynasty general who was best known for his victory over the Khan of Western Turkic Khaganate Ashina Duzhi
- Xue Ne (649–720), a general and official of the Tang dynasty
- Feng Changqing (?－756), a general of the Tang dynasty
- Xue Song (?－773), grandson of Xue Rengui, a general of the rebel state Yan
- Li Keyong (856–908), a Shatuo military governor (Jiedushi) during the late Tang dynasty
- Li Cunxiao (?－894), an adoptive son of Li Keyong and considered one of the strongest warriors in ancient China history
- Li Cunxu (885－926), the Prince of Jin (908–923) and later became Emperor of Later Tang (923–926)
- Li Siyuan (867–933), the second emperor of imperial China's short-lived Later Tang during the Five Dynasties and Ten Kingdoms period
- Shi Jingtang (892–942), the founding emperor of imperial China's short-lived Later Jin during the Five Dynasties and Ten Kingdoms period
- Huyan Zan (?-1000), a military general in the early years of imperial China's Song dynasty
- Di Qing (1008–1057), a military general of the Northern Song dynasty

== Education ==
Shanxi University

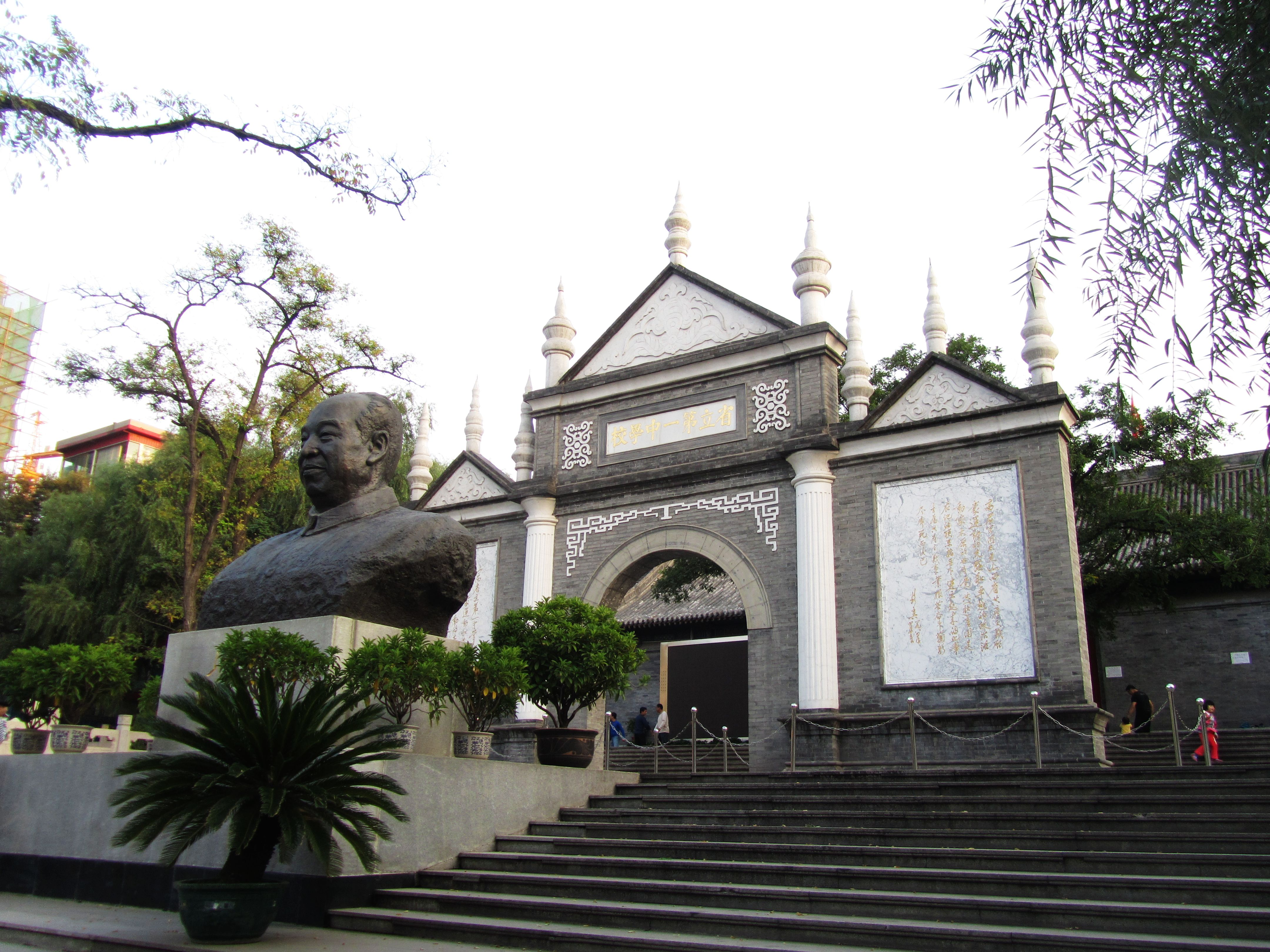
Former No.1 Middle School of Shanxi Province

Major tertiary educational institutions since the 20th century in Shanxi include:

- Shanxi University, 1902
- Taiyuan University of Technology, 1902
- Shanxi Provincial Law and Politics School, 1905, defunct
- Shanxi Industrial Specialized School, 1907, defunct
- Shanxi Agricultural University, 1907
- Shanxi Mining Specialized School, 1909, defunct
- Shanxi Medical University, 1919
- North University of China, 1941
- Changzhi Medical College, 1946
- Shanxi University of Finance and Economics, 1951
- Taiyuan University of Science and Technology, 1952
- Shanxi Normal University, 1958
- Changzhi College, 1958
- Xinzhou Teachers University, 1958
- Jinzhong College, 1958
- Communication University of Shanxi, 1978
- Shanxi College of Traditional Chinese Medicine, 1978
- Yuncheng University, 1978
- Taiyuan Normal University, 1999
- Datong University, 2002

== Health ==
In the early 2000s, coal-based heavy industry contributed to severe air pollution in Shanxi, affecting public health outcomes. Since the implementation of China's Air Pollution Prevention and Control Action Plan in 2013, air quality in the province has improved, with PM2.5 pollution showing a notable decline.

== See also ==
- Shanxi Reservoir
- Shanxi Museum
- Shanxia
- Jinbeisaurus
- Pingyao International Film Festival
- Shanxi Airlines Flight 4218
- Shanxi Loongs
- Shanxi Flame
- Shanxi Coking Company
