= Thiagarajan (disambiguation) =

Thiagarajan (Sivanandam) is an Indian actor, director and producer.

Thiagarajan may also refer to:

Given name

- Thiagarajan Kumararaja, Indian film director and screenwriter
- Thiagarajan Ramani, Indian musician
- Thiagarajan Sadasivam or Kalki Sadasivam, Indian freedom fighter

Surname

- A. Thiagarajan, Indian politician
- Karate R. Thiagarajan, Indian politician
- N. Thiagarajan, Indian photojournalist and photographer
- N. R. Thiagarajan, Indian freedom fighter, congress leader and social activist
- Palanivel Thiagarajan, Indian politician
- Periasamy Thiagarajan, Indian politician
- Prashanth Thiagarajan, Indian actor and businessman
- Tara Thiagarajan, Indian neuroscientist and entrepreneur
- T. M. Thiagarajan, Indian vocalist and musicologist

== See also ==
- R. Thyagarajan (disambiguation)
- Tyaag (disambiguation)
- Tyagaraja, Carnatic composer
- Karumuttu Thiagarajan Chettiar, Indian independence activist and industrialist
- Thiagarajah, alternative form of the Indian name
- Tyagraj Khadilkar, Indian singer and music composer
- Thyagaraj Sports Complex, New Delhi, India
