= Stuart Forster =

British photographer and travel writer

Stuart Forster is a British travel writer, professional photographer and blogger.

== Life and work ==
In March 2015, Forster was named Journalist of the Year at the Holland Press Awards for his body of work on the Netherlands and Dutch culture published in 2014. He retained that title at the 2016 awards. In 2017 he was presented with the award for the Best City Article, for a feature published on Rotterdam.

In 2017 he was presented with the Best Online Coverage award at the British Annual Canada Travel Awards, which are known as the BACTAs within the travel industry. The awards were presented at Canada House in London.

Forster's written work has appeared in the Independent on Sunday, The Sydney Morning Herald, The Hindu, The Times Group publications, and Deccan Herald. He has written and photographed for National Geographic, National Geographic Kids, and The Wisden Cricketer.

He publishes food and travel blog posts on his own site and The Huffington Post. In August 2015, his site was listed among the United Kingdom's top 50 food blogs.

He has contributed to the books The Irresponsible Traveller: Tales of Scrapes and Narrow Escapes (Bradt, 2014), Driving Holidays Across India (Outlook Traveller, 2009), which was named the 2010 winner of India's National Tourism Award for best travel publication in English, and Secret Journeys of a Lifetime: 500 of the World's Best Hidden Travel Gems (National Geographic, 2011). He wrote about snake boat racing in the guidebook Kerala (Stark World, 2006).

Forster is a member of the British Guild of Travel Writers.

His photography is influenced by his mentor, the late Indian photojournalist N. Thiagarajan, who described himself as "a pictorial photojournalist".

In May 2009, one of Forster's images, photographed during a demonstration in Delhi, India, was selected for inclusion in the UK National Union of Journalists' Photography Matters exhibition in London of fifty news photographs taken by NUJ members during 2007 and 2008. His work was also exhibited at the 2006 Pingyao International Photography Festival in Pingyao, China.

Forster is also active in the field of intercultural studies (cross-cultural communication) and lectures on photography and travel writing.

Forster played national league basketball in England and Wales for U.C. Swansea (1990–93) and Leicester Falcons (1993–94). He was selected to play for the University of Wales in the British Universities Sports Federation championships in 1992.
