= Tyagi (disambiguation) =

Tyagi is an Indian caste and surname.

Tyagi may also refer to:

- Tyagi (film), a 1992 Indian film
- Thyagi, a 1982 Indian film by C. V. Rajendran
- Thiyagi, 1947 Indian film

== See also ==
- Tyaag (disambiguation)
