= Wang Family Compound =

Historic building complex in Lingshi County, Shanxi, China

Coordinates: 36°53′46″N 111°52′04″E

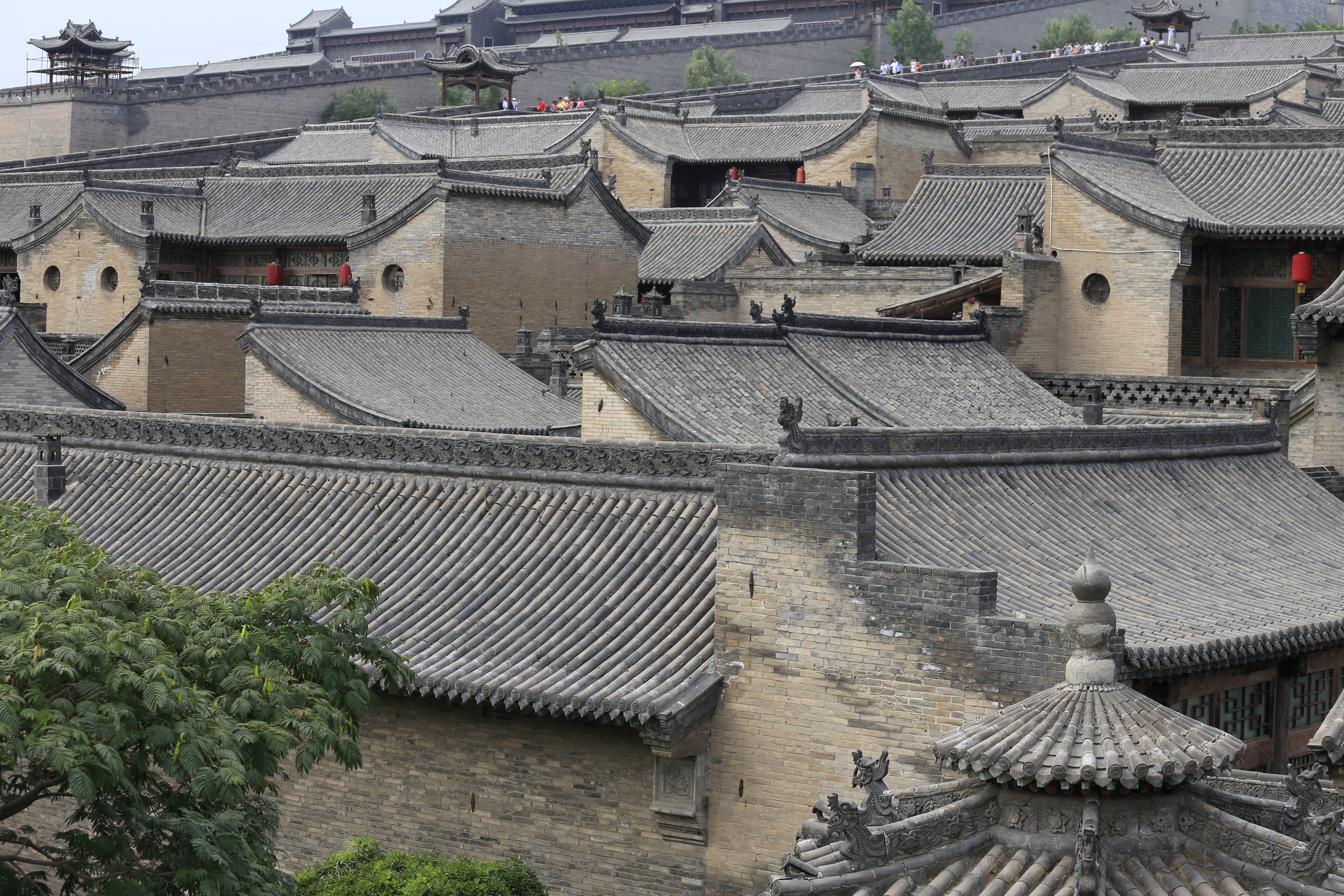
- Slate gray roof tiles of the courtyards
- Simplified Chinese: 王家大院
- Hanyu Pinyin: wángjiā dàyuàn
- Pha̍k-fa-sṳ: vòng-kâ thai-yen/yan

The Wang Family Compound (also variously called the Wang Family Grand Courtyard, Wang Family Mansion, or Wang Family Manor) is the largest of the Shanxi Courtyard Houses. Located in Lingshi County, Shanxi, the fortress compound is a tight arrangement of courtyard residences. It is one of 123 residences listed as part of the "Ancient Residences in Shanxi and Shaanxi Provinces" entry in the UNESCO World Heritage Tentative List in 2008 in the cultural category.

== History ==
The compound was built by the county's Wang family, one of four historically prominent families in the county. The local Wang family traces to a migration from Taiyuan to Jinsheng in 1312 during the Yuan Dynasty. According to family lore the wealth of the family grew from selling bean curd. The local Wangs would reach its apex of wealth and power in 18th century after accumulating riches from business and government position. Over the course of several generations the compound was built on a grand scale during the period from the reign of the Kangxi Emperor (1661–1722) to the Jiaqing Emperor (1796–1820). By the 19th century the fortunes of the family declined and some members took to degeneracy, opium smoking, and public corruption. The Wang family was ousted from the family compound during the Second Sino-Japanese War.

== Location ==
The scattered site made up of several dwelling areas is built on the slope of the Mianshan Mountain on a loessial terrace and faces a river. The gardens are located on multiple levels at different elevations. The compound overlooks village homes of Jingsheng village, which is about 12 km (7.5 mi) away from the county seat of Lingshi. Jingsheng has a history of continuous settlement dating to the Neolithic age.

== Layout ==
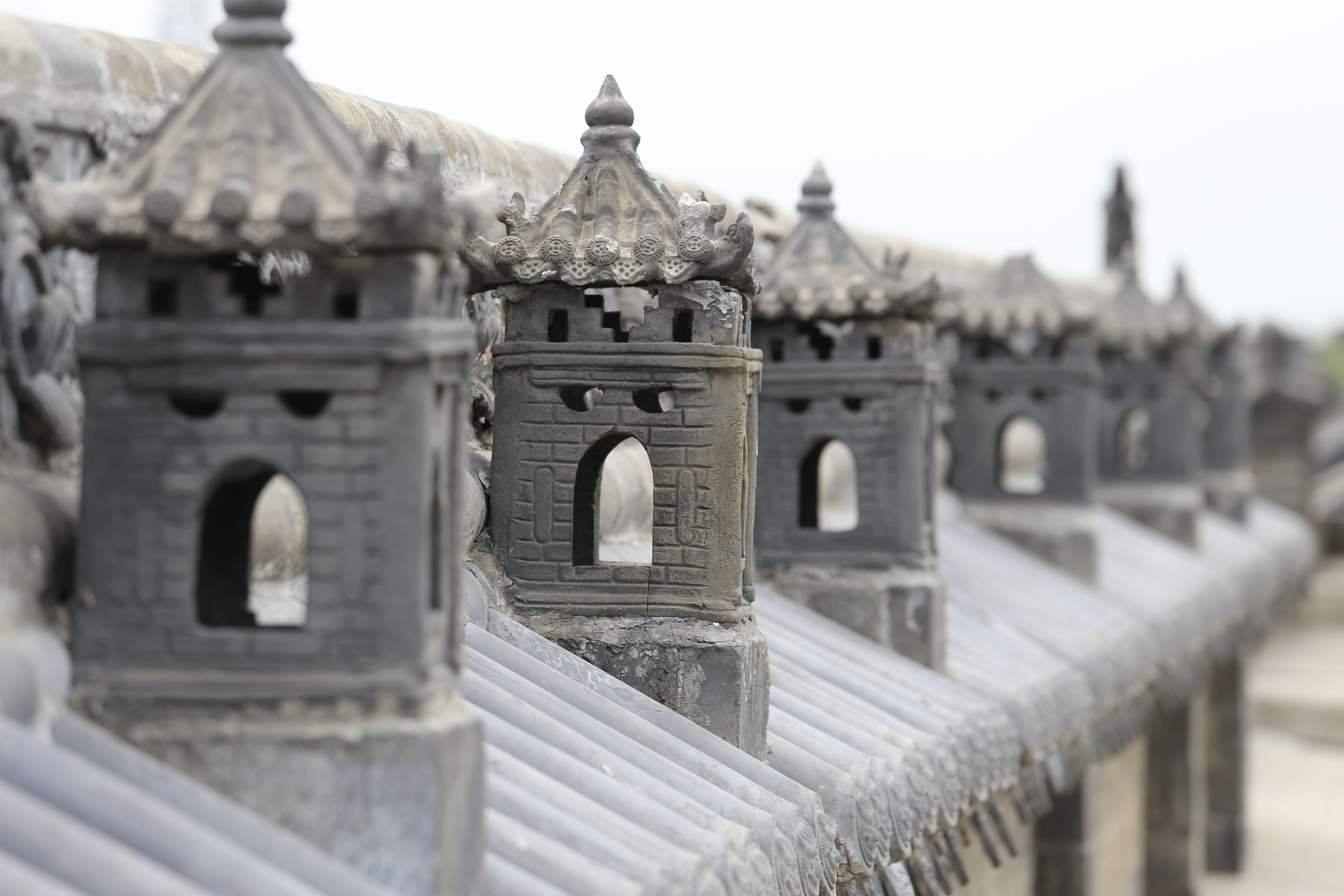

As the building of the compound was a multi-generation endeavor, construction clusters arose one by one. The first two areas of opulent residences were in the Yongcui and Suorui lanes. During the reign of the Qianlong Emperor, the Zhongling lane and Hongmen, Gongji, and Dongnan fortresses were also built. The Chongning Fortress was built during the reign of the Yongzheng Emperor. The last residence area to be built was the Gaojiaya dwelling area from 1796 to 1811. In all there are 231 courtyards and 2,078 rooms on the site situated across 8 hectares. The courtyards are two stories and covered by slate gray roof tiles. The main area of the compound is symmetrical and divided by a moat over which crosses a stone bridge. The four circles of walls are multi-tiered, protecting different layers of dwelling areas from outside threats. Within the courtyards are rooms, kitchens, schools, and prayer pavilions. The ornate stone, brick and wood carvings have themes based on folk customs and folk arts.

== See also ==
- Qiao's Courtyard Houses, Qi County
