= Shanxi Courtyard Houses =

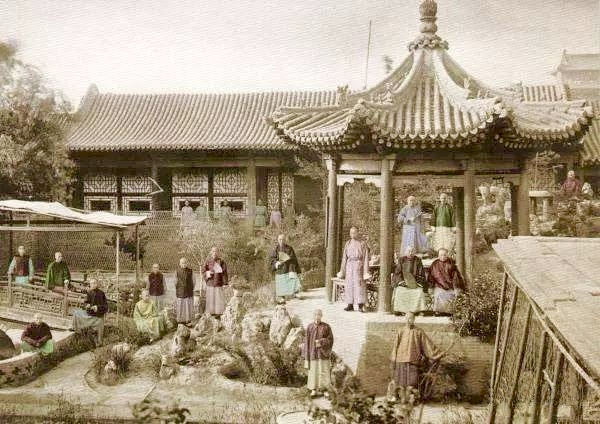
Garden of a Shanxi courtyard house during the Qing dynasty. Colourised from the original black-and-white photograph.

The courtyard houses of Shanxi or the Shanxi family compounds are located in Jinzhong, Shanxi Province, People's Republic of China, approximately 500 km south of Beijing. "These castle-like structures were constructed in the Qing dynasty by local merchants, and offer a glimpse into the architecture and traditional building techniques of the times."

== List ==
- Qiao's Courtyard Houses, Qi County
- Qu's Courtyard Houses, Qi County
- Wang's Courtyard Houses, Lingshi County
- Cao's Courtyard Houses, Taigu County
- Kong Xiangxi's Former Residence, Taigu County

== World Heritage Status ==
The first four of these sites were added to the UNESCO World Heritage Tentative List on March 28, 2008, in the Cultural category.

== See also ==
- Siheyuan and courtyard house
- House of the Huangcheng Chancellor, in southern Shanxi
