= Qiao's Grand Courtyard =

Qiao's Grand Courtyard may refer to:

- Qiao's Grand Courtyard (novel) (乔家大院), 2005 novel by Zhu Xiuhan (朱秀海)
- Qiao's Grand Courtyard (TV series)
- Qiao's Compound, museum in Shanxi, China
