= Tyaag =

Tyaag may refer to:

- Tyāga, sacrifice in Hinduism
- Tyaag (1977 film), a Bollywood film
- Tyaag (2004 film), an Indian Bengali-language action drama film
- Thyagam, a 1978 Indian film
- Thyagam (TV series), Indian soap opera television series

== See also ==
- Thiagarajan (disambiguation)
- Tyagi, an Indian surname
- Tyagi (film), 1992 Indian film
- Thyagi, 1982 Indian film by C. V. Rajendran
- Thiyagi, 1947 Indian film
- Thyagaiah (1946 film), an Indian film about Carnatic music composer Tyagaraja
