= R. Thyagarajan =

R. Thyagarajan is an Indian name and may refer to:

- R. Thyagarajan (director)
- R. Thyagarajan (industrialist)
- R. Thiyagarajan, politician

== See also ==
- Thiagarajan (disambiguation)
