= Lingshi County =

Lingshi 灵石县 Lingshih
- County
- Location of the seat in Shanxi
- Coordinates: 36°50′56″N 111°46′35″E
- Country: People's Republic of China
- Province: Shanxi
- Prefecture-level city: Jinzhong

Area
  - Total: 1,206 km^{2} (466 sq mi)

Population
  - Total: 251,000
  - Density: 208/km^{2} (539/sq mi)
- Time zone: UTC+8 (China Standard)
- Postal code: 031300
- Area code: 0354

Lingshi County (simplified Chinese: 灵石县; traditional Chinese: 靈石縣; pinyin: Língshí Xiàn) is a county of southwest-central Shanxi province, China. It is under the administration of Jinzhong city.

Scenic site in Lingshi
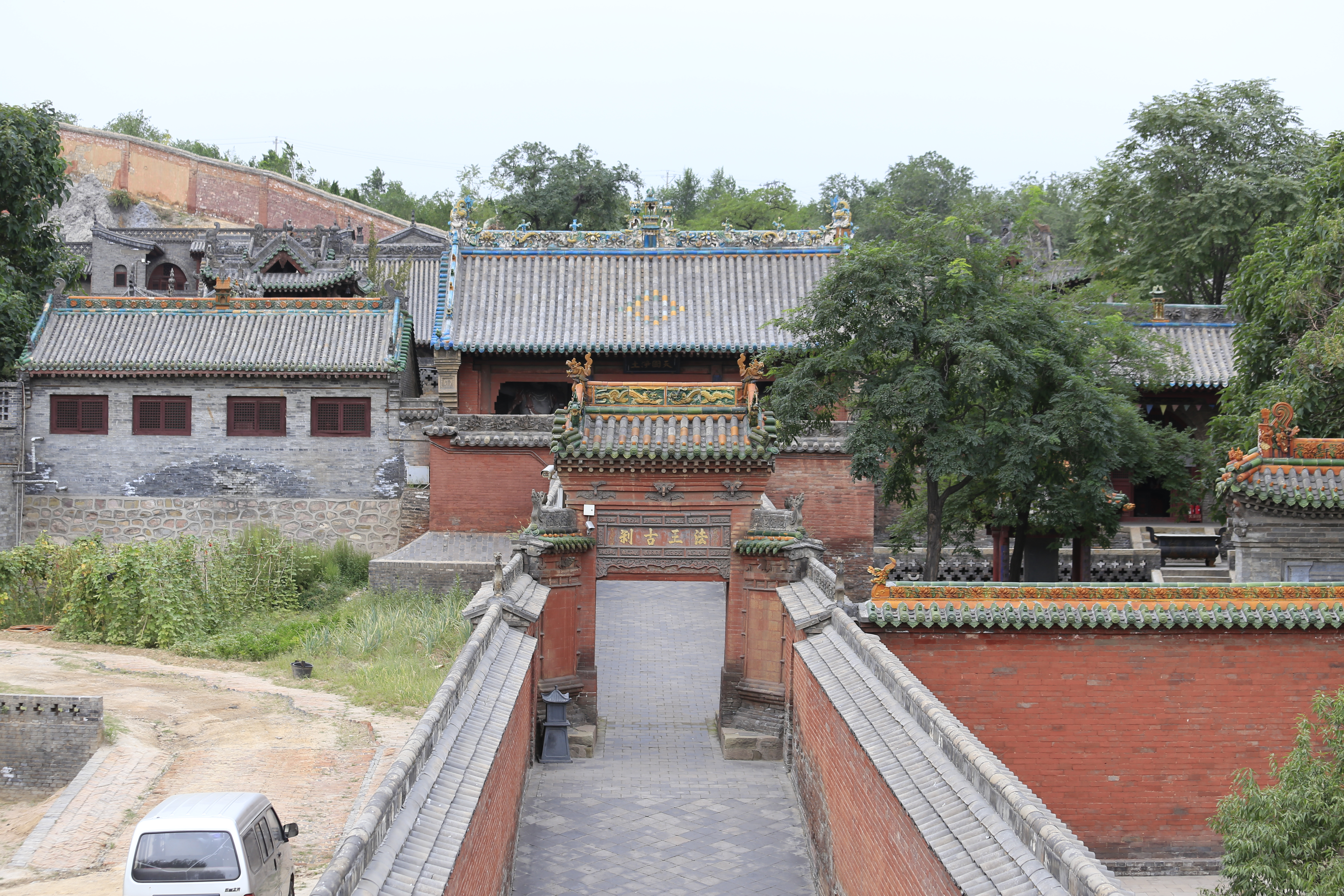
Zishou Temple

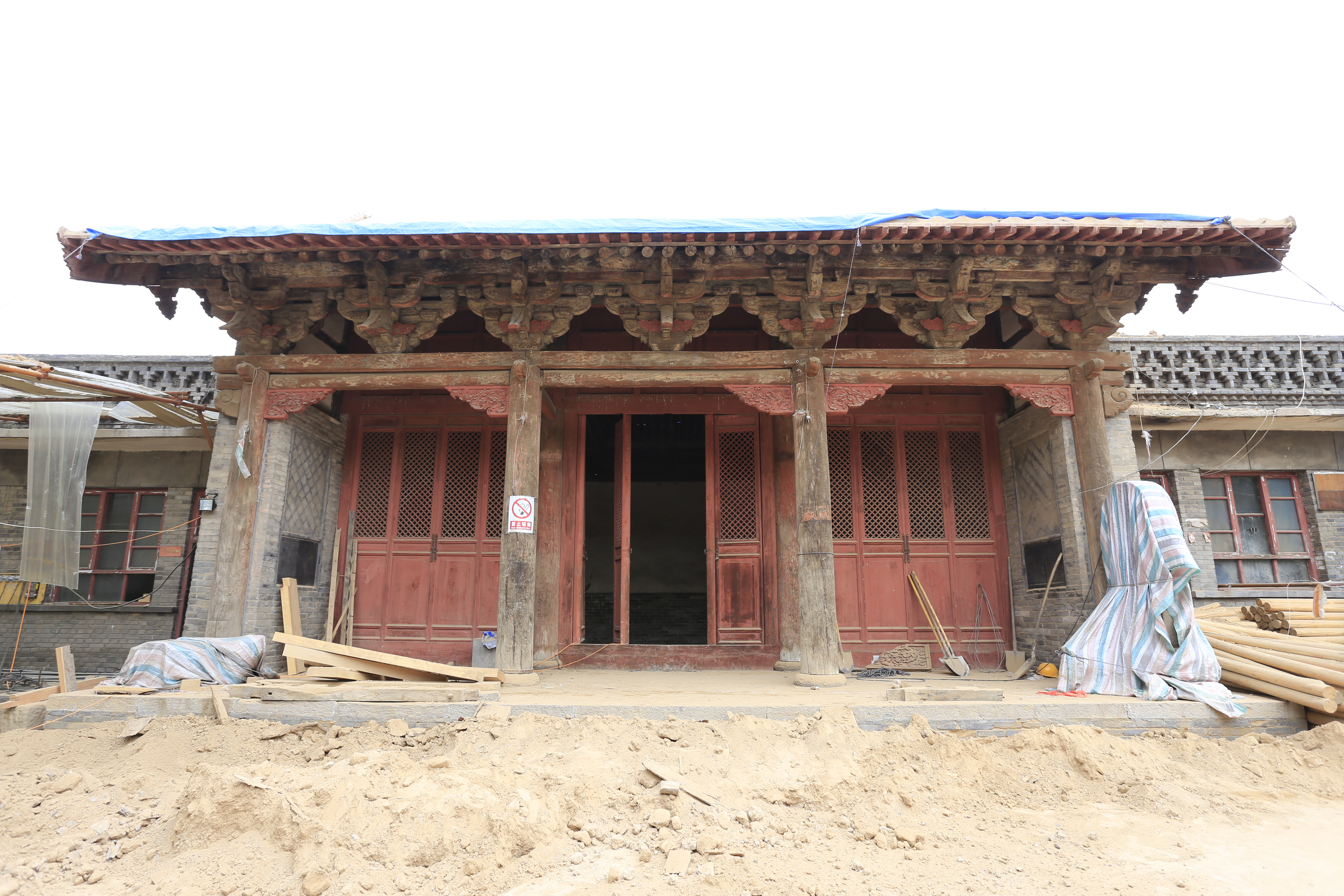
Lingshi Houtu Temple

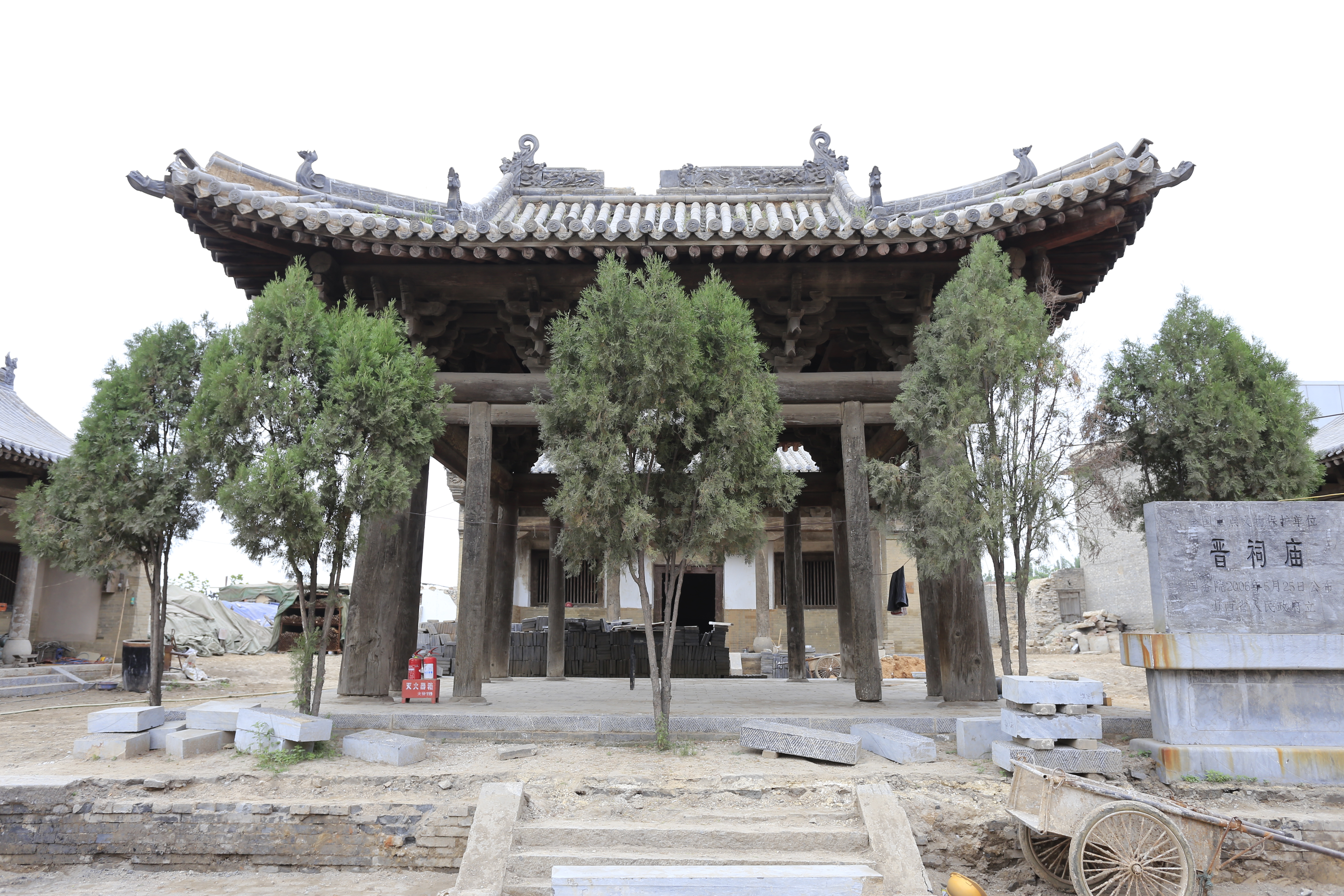
Jinci Temple

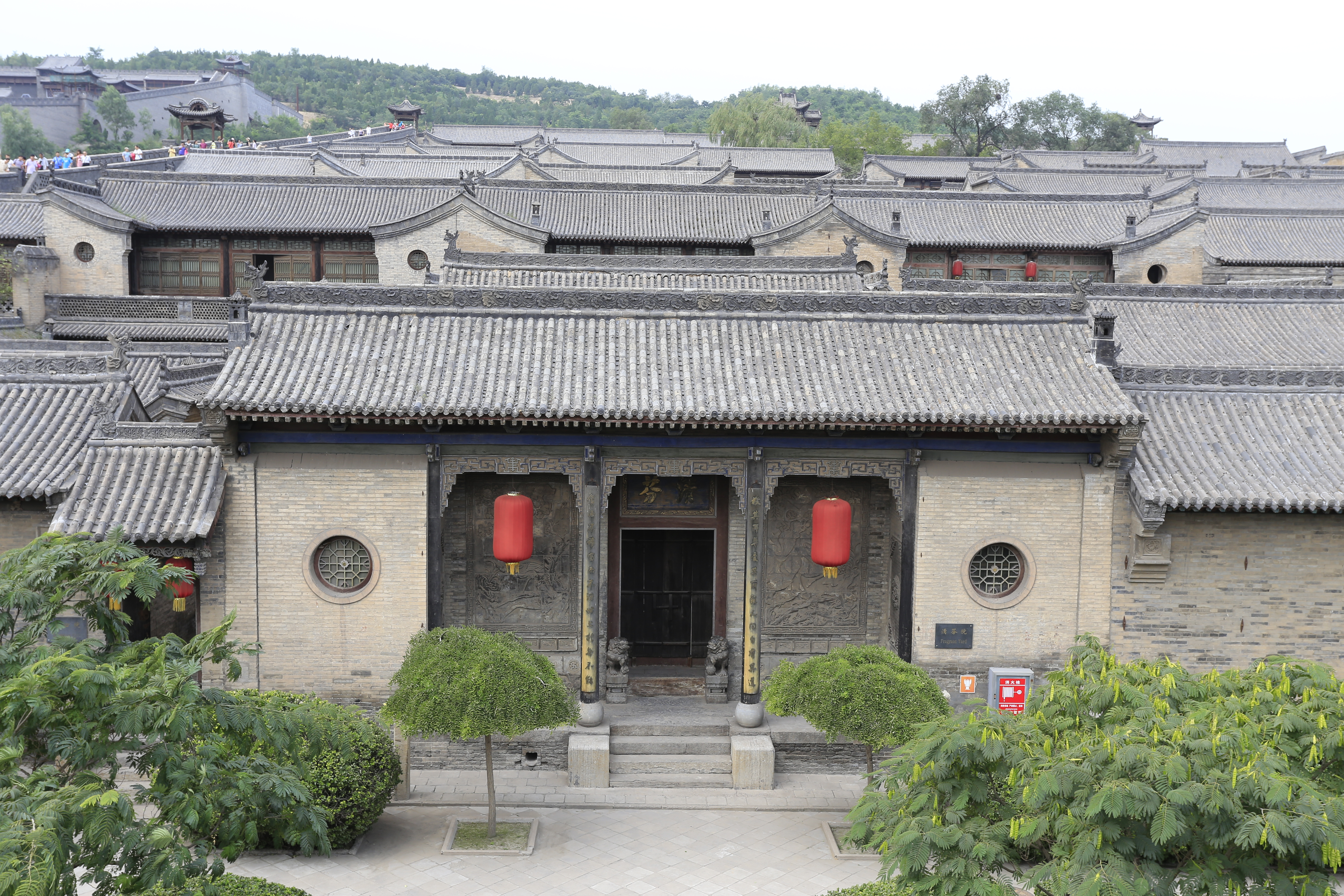
Wang Family Compound

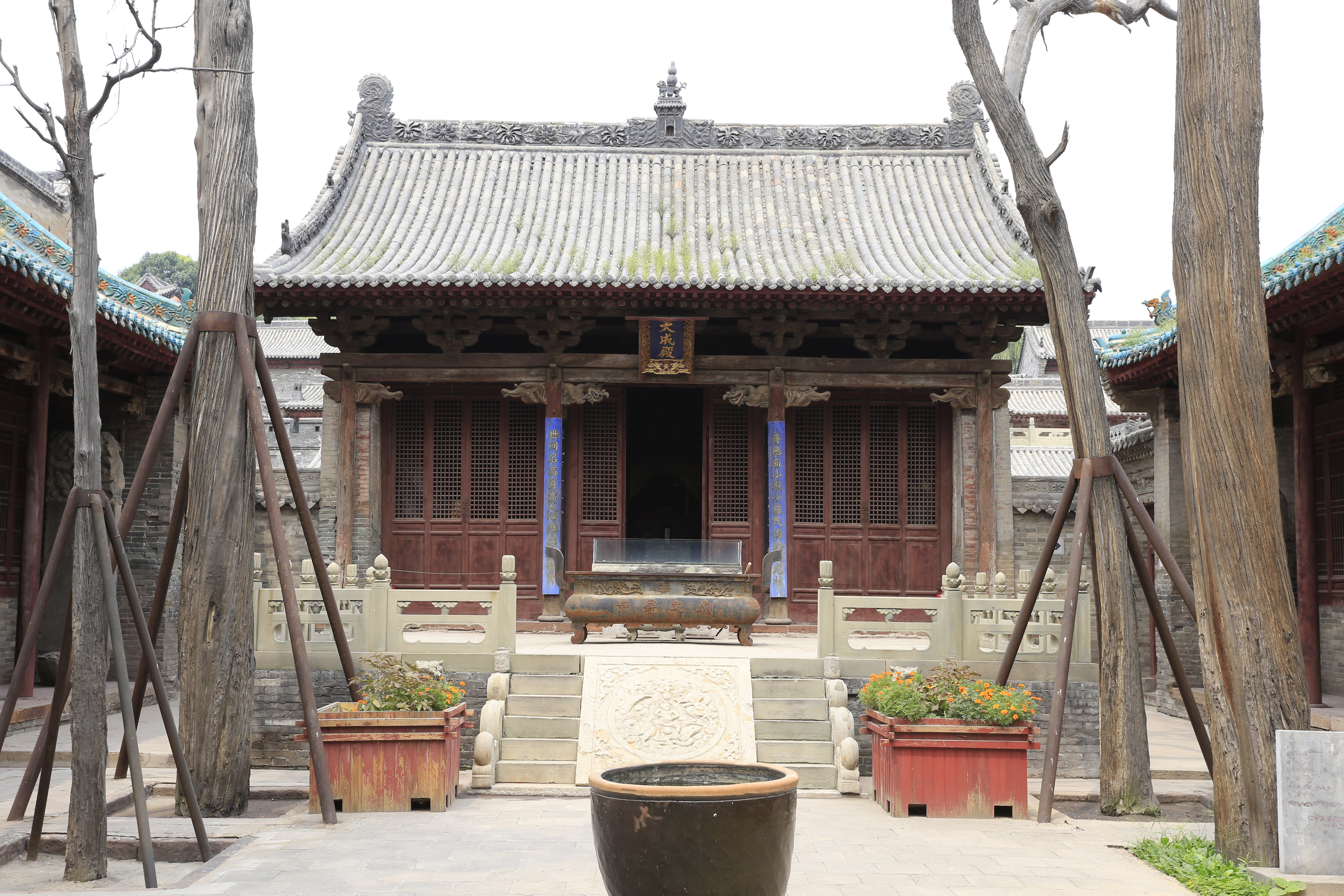
Jingsheng Confucian Temple

== Climate ==
Climate data for Lingshi, elevation 812 m (2,664 ft), (1991–2020 normals, extremes 1981–2010)
Month	Jan	Feb	Mar	Apr	May	Jun	Jul	Aug	Sep	Oct	Nov	Dec	Year
Record high °C (°F)	16.2 (61.2)	20.7 (69.3)	29.0 (84.2)	34.6 (94.3)	37.5 (99.5)	39.6 (103.3)	40.4 (104.7)	37.1 (98.8)	36.3 (97.3)	30.0 (86.0)	22.8 (73.0)	16.4 (61.5)	40.4 (104.7)
Mean daily maximum °C (°F)	3.4 (38.1)	7.4 (45.3)	13.8 (56.8)	20.9 (69.6)	26.2 (79.2)	30.1 (86.2)	30.8 (87.4)	28.8 (83.8)	24.1 (75.4)	18.3 (64.9)	11.0 (51.8)	4.6 (40.3)	18.3 (64.9)
Daily mean °C (°F)	−4.1 (24.6)	−0.1 (31.8)	6.4 (43.5)	13.4 (56.1)	18.9 (66.0)	23.0 (73.4)	24.5 (76.1)	22.6 (72.7)	17.5 (63.5)	11.0 (51.8)	3.8 (38.8)	−2.6 (27.3)	11.2 (52.1)
Mean daily minimum °C (°F)	−9.5 (14.9)	−5.8 (21.6)	0.1 (32.2)	6.6 (43.9)	11.9 (53.4)	16.3 (61.3)	19.2 (66.6)	17.8 (64.0)	12.4 (54.3)	5.6 (42.1)	−1.5 (29.3)	−7.7 (18.1)	5.4 (41.8)
Record low °C (°F)	−22.1 (−7.8)	−18.8 (−1.8)	−13.1 (8.4)	−5.7 (21.7)	0.7 (33.3)	7.0 (44.6)	12.6 (54.7)	9.7 (49.5)	1.3 (34.3)	−5.8 (21.6)	−16.7 (1.9)	−20.4 (−4.7)	−22.1 (−7.8)
Average precipitation mm (inches)	4.7 (0.19)	7.8 (0.31)	11.9 (0.47)	29.0 (1.14)	34.1 (1.34)	56.6 (2.23)	126.0 (4.96)	110.0 (4.33)	66.1 (2.60)	35.2 (1.39)	15.1 (0.59)	4.1 (0.16)	500.6 (19.71)
Average precipitation days (≥ 0.1 mm)	2.7	3.0	4.0	5.5	6.8	8.8	12.5	10.9	8.7	6.6	4.1	2.1	75.7
Average snowy days	3.2	3.8	2.4	0.4	0	0	0	0	0	0.1	2.1	2.7	14.7
Average relative humidity (%)	55	53	48	47	49	56	69	73	72	68	62	57	59
Mean monthly sunshine hours	143.5	150.0	190.3	218.9	240.5	218.0	195.7	182.0	164.7	170.1	153.5	140.7	2,167.9
Percentage possible sunshine	46	49	51	55	55	50	44	44	45	50	51	47	49
Source: China Meteorological Administration
