= Thiagarajah =

Thiagarajah தியாகராஜா
- Pronunciation: Tiyākarājā
- Gender: Male
- Language: Tamil

Origin
- Region of origin: Southern India; North-eastern Sri Lanka

Other names
- Alternative spelling: Thiyagarajah; Thyagaraja; Tyagaraja

Thiagarajah or Thiyagarajah (Tamil: தியாகராஜா, romanized: Tiyākarājā) is a Tamil male given name. Due to the Tamil tradition of using patronymic surnames it may also be a surname for males and females.

== Notable people ==
=== Given name ===
- Tyagaraja (1767–1847), Indian composer
- A. Thiagarajah (1916–1981), Sri Lankan politician
- M. Thiyagarajah, Sri Lankan politician
- M. D. Thyagaraja Pillai, Indian politician
- M. K. Thyagaraja Bhagavathar (1910–1959), Indian actor

=== Surname ===
- Chelvy Thiyagarajah (died 1991), Sri Lankan poet
- Daniel Thiagarajah, Sri Lankan bishop
- J. Tyagaraja (born 1895), Ceylonese politician
- Thiyagarajah Maheswaran (1966–2008), Sri Lankan politician

== See also ==
- Thyagaiah (1946 film), 1946 Indian film about Tyagaraja
