= Pingyao =

Pingyao Ancient City 平遥古城
- Town
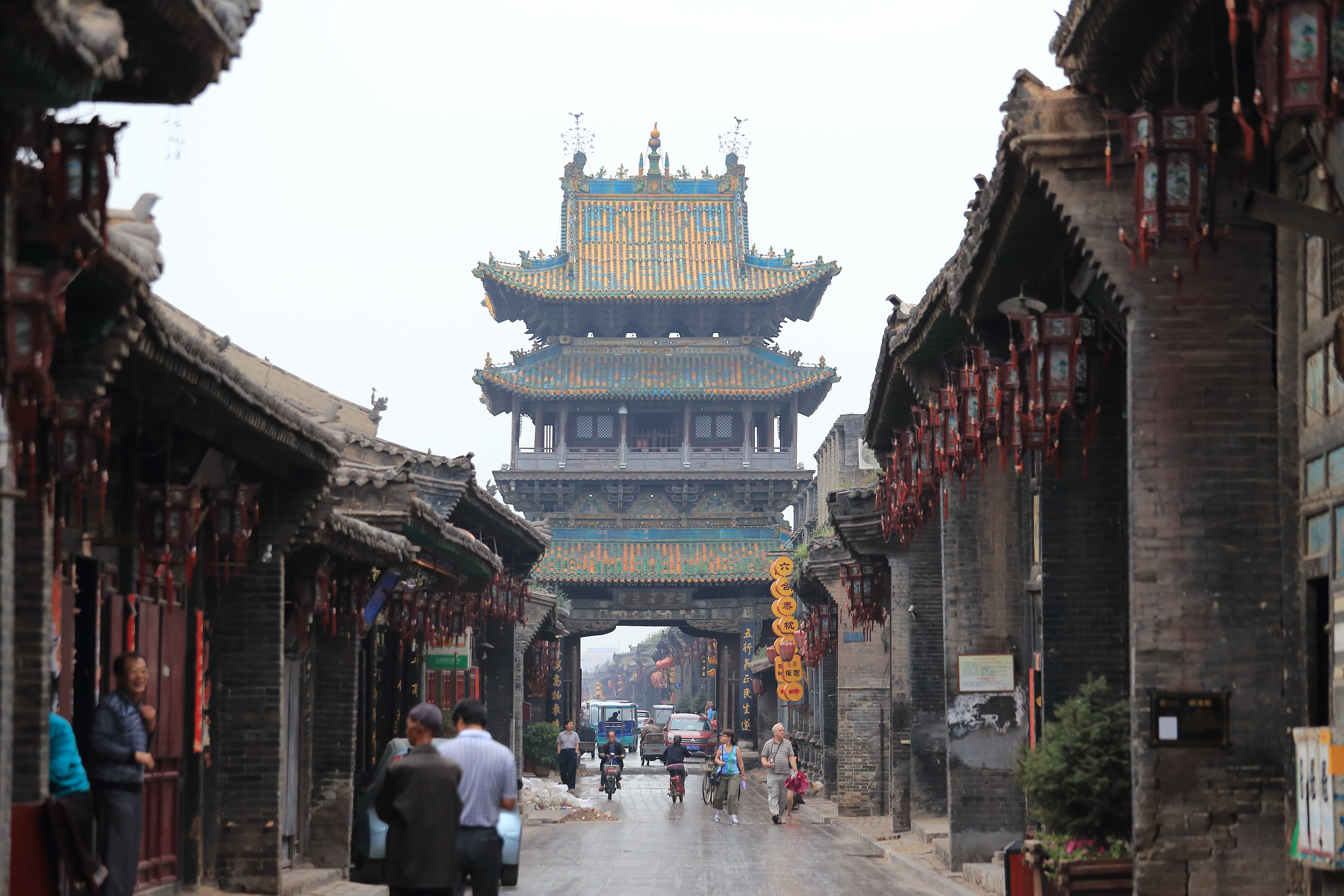
- The Market Tower of Pingyao; date of original construction unknown, rebuilt in 1688 during the Qing dynasty.

- Location in Shanxi
- Coordinates: 37°12′N 112°9′E
- Country: China
- Province: Shanxi
- Prefecture: Jinzhong
- County: Pingyao

Population (2009)
  - Total: 48,531
- Time zone: UTC+8 (China Standard)
- Postal code: 031100
- Area code: 0354
- Website: www.pingyao.gov.cn

UNESCO World Heritage Site
- Official name: Ancient City of Ping Yao
- Type: Cultural
- Criteria: ii, iii, iv
- Designated: 1997 (21st session)
- Reference no.: 812
- Region: Asia-Pacific
- Extensions: 2000; 2001

Pingyao
- Traditional Chinese: 平遙
- Simplified Chinese: 平遥
- Literal meaning: remote plain
Transcriptions
Standard Mandarin
- Hanyu Pinyin: Píngyáo
- Wade–Giles: P‘ing-yao
- IPA: [pʰǐŋ.jǎʊ]
Yue: Cantonese
- Yale Romanization: Pìhng-yìuh
- Jyutping: Ping4-jiu4
Southern Min
- Tâi-lô: Pîng-iâu

Alternative Chinese name
- Simplified Chinese: 平遥古城
- Literal meaning: Pingyao Ancient City
Transcriptions
Standard Mandarin
- Hanyu Pinyin: Píngyáo Gǔchéng

Pingyao, officially Pingyao Ancient City, is a walled city in central Shanxi, China, famed for its importance in Chinese economic history and for its well-preserved Ming and Qing urban planning and architecture. It is the only walled city seat in China to survive with both its historic street plan and its original building fabric substantially intact. The greater part of the city's courtyard dwellings, shopfronts and temples are ancient structures surviving in situ rather than modern reconstructions. Administratively, it comprises the town of Gutao in Pingyao County, Jinzhong.

The town was founded in the 14th century AD and has been the seat of local government since at least the Qin. By the 16th century, it was a regional financial hub; it had been the financial centre of the Qing Empire in the late 19th century. Pingyao Ancient City is located in Pingyao County, Shanxi Province. The ancient city was built during the reign of King Xuan of Zhou (827-782 BC) and has a history of more than 2800 years.

In and around the ancient city there are 1,075 registered immovable cultural relics, 143 of which are designated protection units at the national, provincial, municipal, or county level, including 20 Major Historical and Cultural Sites Protected at the National Level, dating from the Five Dynasties, Song, Jin, Yuan, Ming and Qing periods. It is a AAAAA-rated tourist attraction, and the settlement and the outlying Zhenguo Temple and Shuanglin Temple became a World Heritage Site in 1997.

== History ==
There was already a settlement in place at Pingyao by the reign of the Xuan King (r. c. 827 – c. 782 BC), when the Zhou raised earthen ramparts around the site. In the Spring and Autumn period, the county belonged to the kingdom of Jin. It was part of the kingdom of Zhao in the Warring States period. Under the Qin, it was known as Pingtao. During the Han dynasty, it was known as the seat of Zhongdu County.

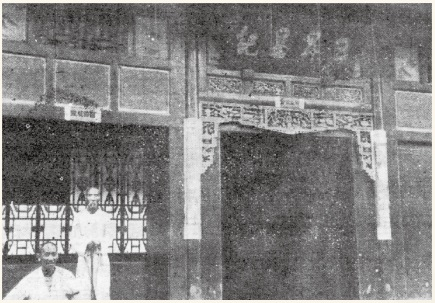
The front gate of Rishengchang's headquarters, photographed during the Qing Dynasty.

Pingyao served as the financial center of the region from the 16th century and of the entire Qing Empire during the late 19th century. During those times, there were more than 20 financial institutions within the city, comprising more than half of the total in the whole country. Rishengchang was the first and largest, controlling almost half of China's silver trade under the late Qing before going bankrupt in 1914 in the aftermath of the Xinhai Revolution. Organized restorations have been undertaken periodically since the 15th century, the most recent phase beginning in 1979. In 1986, China designated Pingyao as one of the Chinese Historical and Cultural Cities. In 2004, part of the southern walls collapsed. In 2015, Pingyao ancient city became a national 5A-class tourist attraction.

== Geography ==
Pingyao is located on the east bank of the Fen River near the southwestern edge of the Taiyuan Basin, located in the central part of Shanxi Province in northern China, southwest of Taiyuan Basin in the middle reaches of the Yellow River and eastern Loess Plateau. It is approximately 100 km (62 mi) south of central Taiyuan and 715 km (444 mi) southwest of Beijing, the national capital. Pingyao County is adjacent to Qi County, whose seat is also a protected historical and cultural city.

=== Climate ===
Pingyao County belongs to a temperate continental climate, characterized by a mild and dry climate, large temperature differences between winter and summer, and strong sandstorms in winter. The annual average temperature is 10.2 °C, and the annual precipitation is about 540 millimeters, with most of the precipitation concentrated in summer. The climate of Pingyao is temperate. It is cold in winter, often having northwestern winds with little snow and severe fog. In the spring, the temperature varies greatly between day and night, with a little rain and some winds. Summertime is often hot, humid and rainy. Autumn days have falling temperatures with little rain and are cool and clear with abundant sunshine.

Climate data for Pingyao, elevation 780 m (2,560 ft), (1991–2020 normals, extremes 1981–2010)
Month	Jan	Feb	Mar	Apr	May	Jun	Jul	Aug	Sep	Oct	Nov	Dec	Year
Record high °C (°F)	13.6 (56.5)	22.2 (72.0)	29.3 (84.7)	37.3 (99.1)	38.0 (100.4)	41.1 (106.0)	39.6 (103.3)	37.7 (99.9)	37.5 (99.5)	30.3 (86.5)	24.3 (75.7)	17.5 (63.5)	41.1 (106.0)
Mean daily maximum °C (°F)	2.8 (37.0)	7.3 (45.1)	14.0 (57.2)	21.4 (70.5)	26.9 (80.4)	30.4 (86.7)	31.0 (87.8)	29.1 (84.4)	24.5 (76.1)	18.5 (65.3)	10.7 (51.3)	3.9 (39.0)	18.4 (65.1)
Daily mean °C (°F)	−4.4 (24.1)	−0.5 (31.1)	6.3 (43.3)	13.5 (56.3)	19.3 (66.7)	23.2 (73.8)	24.7 (76.5)	22.8 (73.0)	17.5 (63.5)	11.0 (51.8)	3.6 (38.5)	−2.6 (27.3)	11.2 (52.2)
Mean daily minimum °C (°F)	−9.9 (14.2)	−6.4 (20.5)	−0.3 (31.5)	6.0 (42.8)	11.5 (52.7)	16.2 (61.2)	19.2 (66.6)	17.6 (63.7)	12.0 (53.6)	5.3 (41.5)	−1.7 (28.9)	−7.6 (18.3)	5.2 (41.3)
Record low °C (°F)	−22.4 (−8.3)	−24.1 (−11.4)	−13.2 (8.2)	−8.5 (16.7)	−1.9 (28.6)	5.3 (41.5)	11.3 (52.3)	8.3 (46.9)	−0.7 (30.7)	−8.0 (17.6)	−21.9 (−7.4)	−22.1 (−7.8)	−24.1 (−11.4)
Average precipitation mm (inches)	2.2 (0.09)	4.3 (0.17)	9.3 (0.37)	26.1 (1.03)	30.2 (1.19)	42.4 (1.67)	97.6 (3.84)	90.9 (3.58)	58.5 (2.30)	32.4 (1.28)	11.8 (0.46)	2.4 (0.09)	408.1 (16.07)
Average precipitation days (≥ 0.1 mm)	2.3	2.6	3.6	5.3	6.2	9.1	11.3	10.2	8.1	6.2	3.7	1.6	70.2
Average snowy days	3.0	3.6	2.1	0.6	0	0	0	0	0	0.1	1.9	2.7	14
Average relative humidity (%)	52	49	46	47	47	55	68	73	72	67	60	53	57
Mean monthly sunshine hours	149.2	166.8	201.9	226.0	248.3	224.9	213.0	199.7	177.3	180.4	161.3	150.5	2,299.3
Percentage possible sunshine	48	54	54	57	56	51	48	48	48	53	53	51	52
Source: China Meteorological Administration

=== Architecture ===
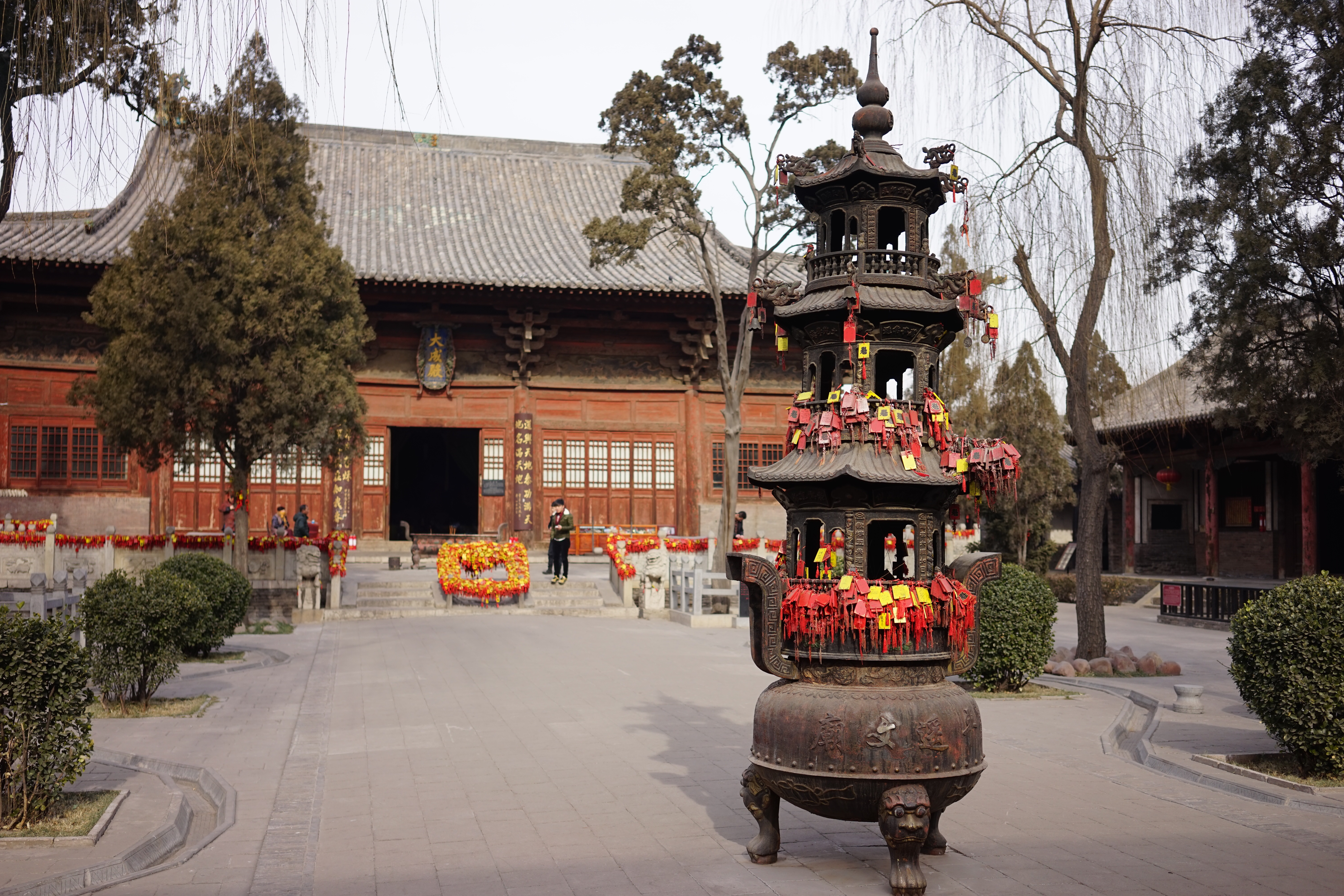
The Dacheng Hall of Pingyao Confucian Temple, rebuilt in 1163 during Jin dynasty, is the oldest existing hall among all Confucian temples of all levels in China

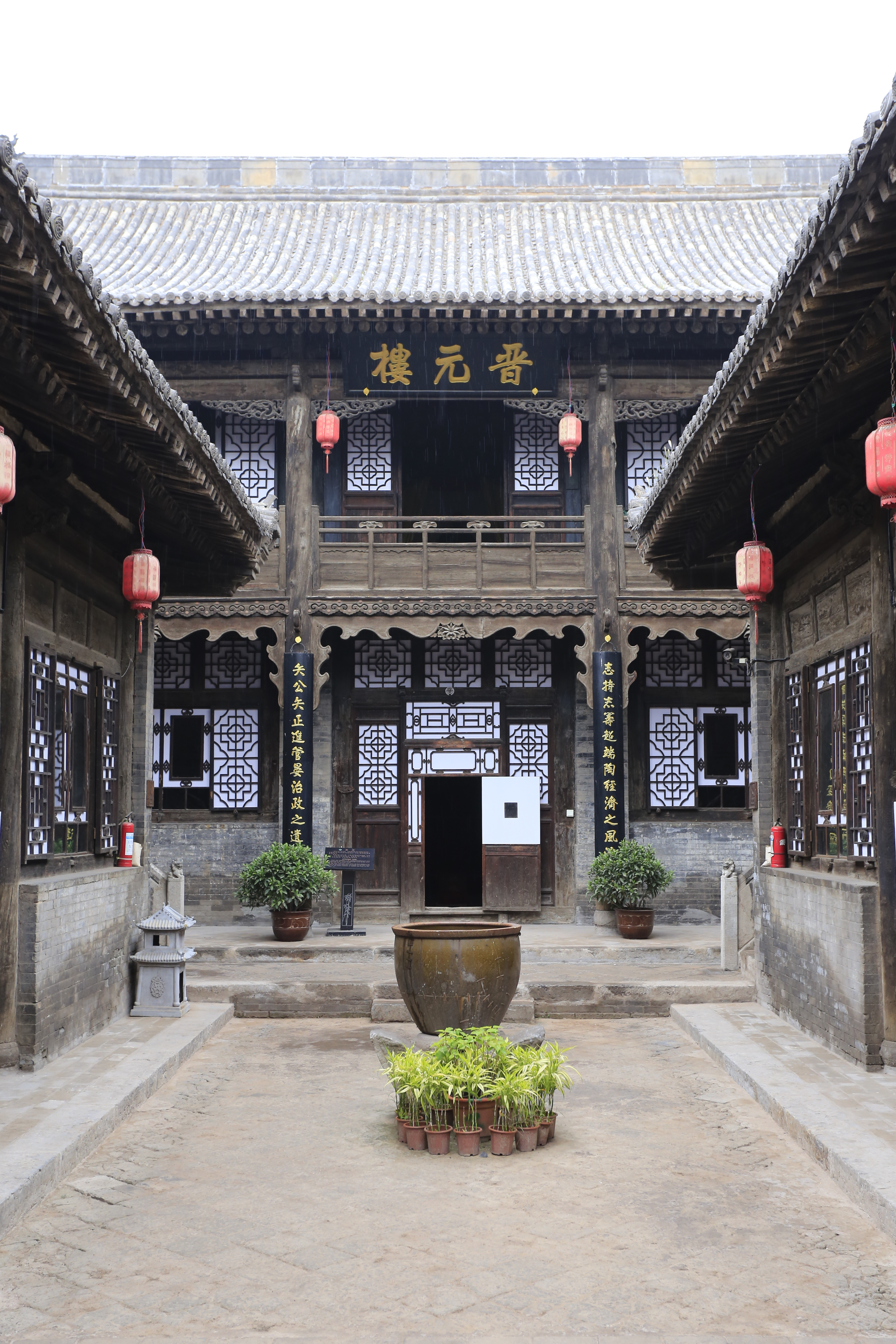
One of the courtyards of the Lei Lutai family's residence (雷履泰旧居), Lei was the first manager of first piaohao in China

Pingyao still retains its urban layout from the Ming and Qing dynasties, conforming to a typical ba gua pattern. More than 300 sites in or near the city have ancient ruins. The city has over a hundred streets and lanes, lined with close to 4,000 17th–19th century shops and residences. The streets and storefronts still largely retain their historical appearance. In addition, the ancient urban city is still home to 20,000+ people, making Pingyao one of the best examples of an ancient "living city".

Models for every type of siheyuan form and courtyard layout in China can be found in Pingyao. The city's buildings are composed of architectural forms, construction methods and standards of building materials from different historical periods in China from the 14th to the 19th century. Among the ornamentation of the dwellings of the city, wood carvings, stone carvings and brick carvings can be found everywhere. Carved stone lions, mounting stones and hitching posts stand outside many gates. Wooden chuihua gatehouses (hanging-flower gates) of differing styles have been carved with figures or with flowers and birds. Doors and windows are also carved with patterns, and beneath the eaves there are often wood carvings, brick carvings or polychrome painted murals, whose subjects include Sanxing, the four arts of the qin, go, calligraphy and painting, and tales of historical figures.

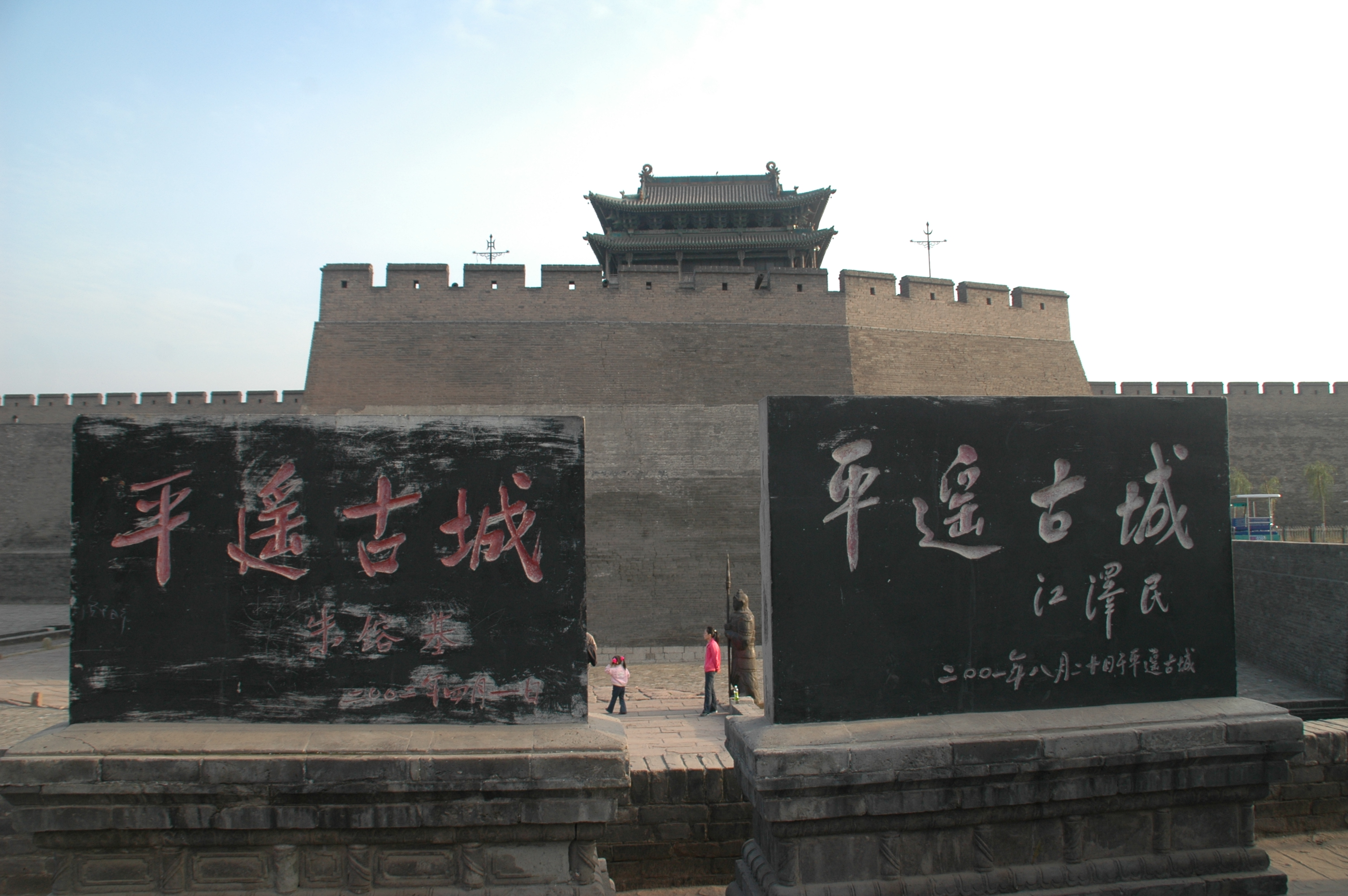
The calligraphy of Jiang Zemin and Zhu Rongji grace a vista on the walled city of Pingyao

Given just how fast and eager China is to modernize its cities and push architectural progress, finding such a well-preserved historic city in China has become rarer. Despite the ancient city being in a state of disrepair, the old urban layouts and walls still serve as an example of Ming and Qing dynasty architectural styles. The city walls of Pingyao were constructed in 1370, the 3rd year of the Hongwu Emperor of the Ming. They enclose an area of about 2.25 km^{2} (0.87 sq mi). The town is accessed by six barbican gates, one each on the north and south walls and two each on the east and west walls. This pattern is similar to that of a turtle (the head, tail and four legs), earning Pingyao the moniker "Turtle City." The walls measure about 12 m (39 ft) high, with a perimeter of 6,163 m (20,220 ft). A 4 m wide and 4 m (13 ft) deep moat can be found just outside the walls. Aside from the four structured towers at the four corners, there are also 72 watchtowers and more than 3,000 battlements. The number of defensive works supposedly represents the number of Confucius' disciples and other students. The walls are considered among the best-preserved ancient city walls on this scale-aside from the Great Wall of China.

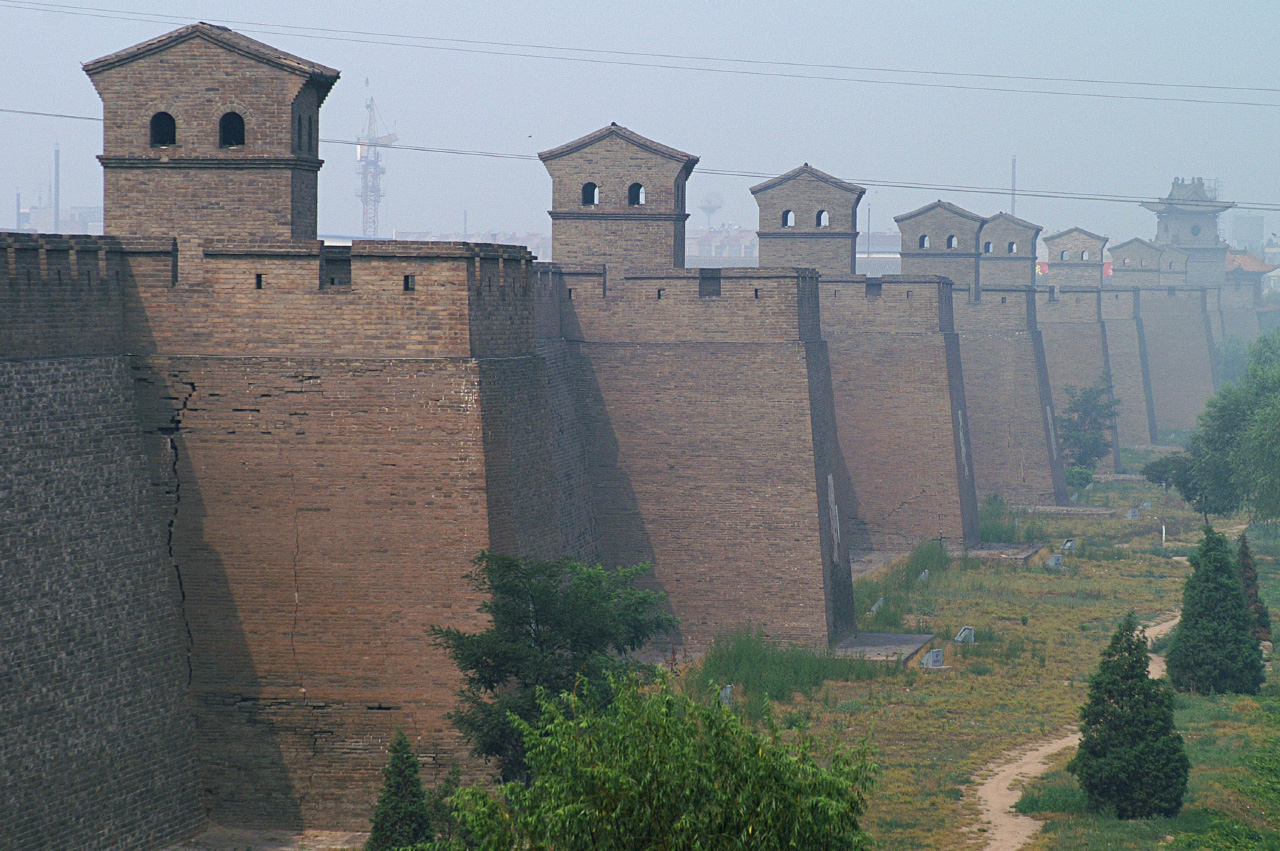
The fortified wall of Pingyao city, Shanxi, China

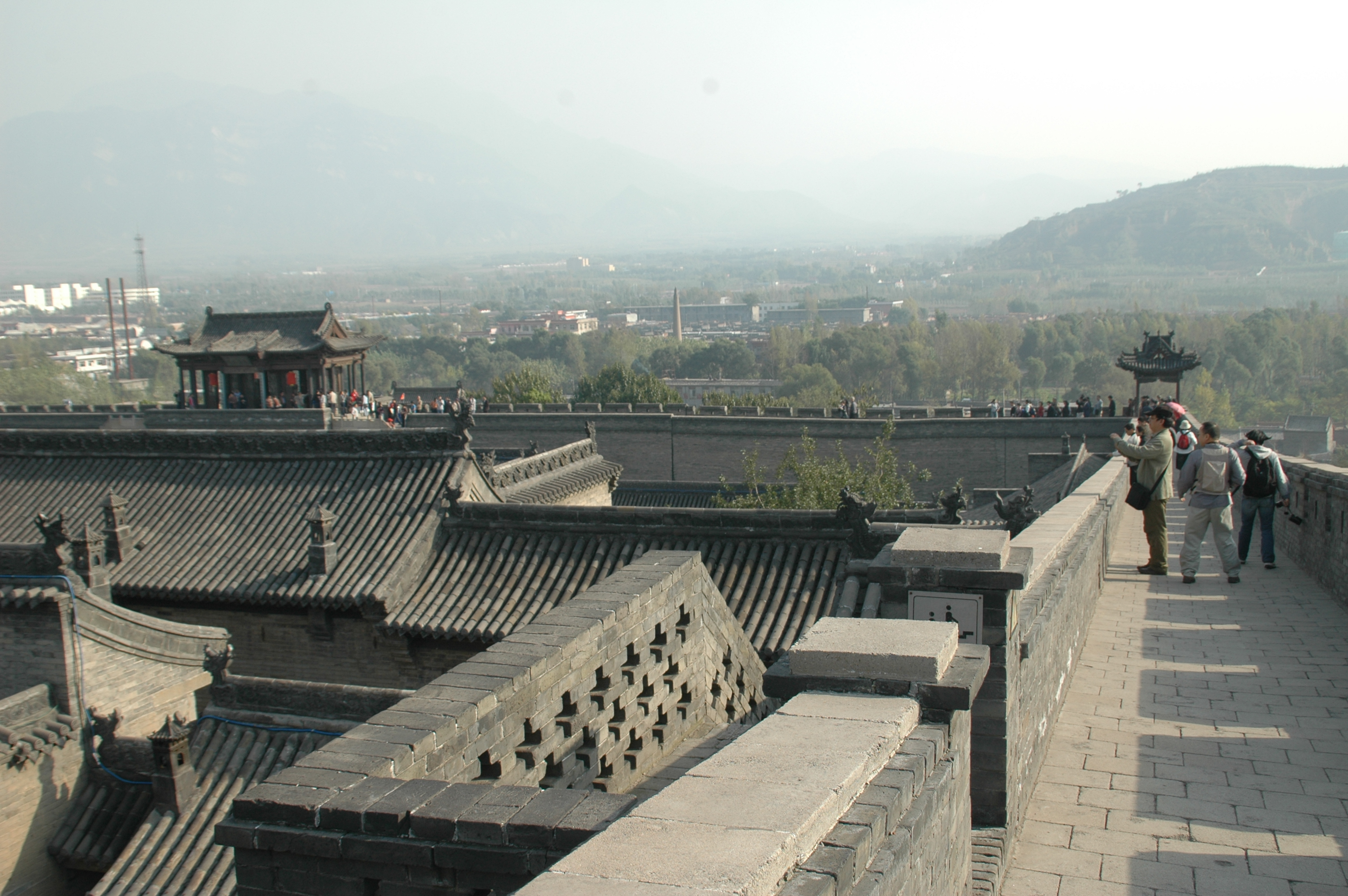
Looking out from the city walls towards the outside of the city

Given the extensive history of trade and growing wealth of families in the city in early 19th century China, many families were able to have great fortress-like structures built for themselves. One such structure was the Qiao family compound located just outside Pingyao. The compound was constructed in 1756, during the Qing Dynasty. The Qiao family had made a fortune as merchants of tea and tofu. By the third generation, the family head was Qiao Zhiyong, who built the merchant business into an Empire over the Shanxi province where Pingyao is located. Zhiyong made several expansions to the compound including Qiao's Grand Courtyard, which actually is an extensive courtyard complex. The 8,000+ square meter courtyard complex, meant to resemble the Chinese figure Xi (translates to "pleasure") when viewed from above, features 6 large yards with 20 smaller courtyards within them. In total, the courtyards alone are surrounded by 313 rooms with several connective alleys making patrol easy for the guards working within the complex for the Qiao family's protection. As for the house itself, the complex reflects a traditional—yet massive—example of a Qing Dynasty mansion. The construction is primarily stone and timber using various traditional methods from the Chinese 18th-19th centuries. Many entrances to the grounds are overlooked by large stone guardian lion statues, a symbol of protection in Chinese culture and often applied to Chinese architecture. Another notable aspect of the house are the extensive exterior walls, stretching 10 meters high. The Qiao family resided in the mansion until the 1980's, where sometime after the massive complex has since been converted to a museum, seeing thousands of visitors annually.

== Demographics ==
According to the seventh Chinese census data, the permanent resident population of the county is 450,697. Compared with the 502,712 people in the sixth national census in 2010, it has decreased by 52,015 people in ten years, a decrease of 10.35%, and the average annual growth rate is -1.09%.

As of 2009, Pingyao had a population of 48,531 people living in 16,634 households. 12,132 residents held local hukous and 36,399 were from other parts of China.

As of the end of 2023 and the beginning of 2024, the permanent population is 442,785, with an urbanization rate of 50.3%. The urban population is 222,832, the rural population is 219,953, with 225,301 males and 217,484 females.

== Governments ==
Pingyao Ancient City and its environs are organized as the town of "Gutao", the seat of Pingyao County. Gutao directly oversees 10 administrative villages:

Villages
Name	Simp.	Trad.	Pinyin	Meaning
Dongcheng	东城村	東城村	Dōngchéngcūn	East City Village
Xicheng	西城村	西城村	Xīchéngcūn	West City Village
Nancheng	南城村	南城村	Nánchéngcūn	South City Village
Beicheng	北城村	北城村	Běichéngcūn	North City Village
Gankeng	干坑村	干坑村	Gānkēngcūn	Arid Pit Village
Shijiujie	十九街村	十九街村	Shíjiǔjiē Cūn	19-Street Village
Chengnanbao	城南堡村	城南堡村	Chéngnánbǎo Cūn	Southern Rampart Village
Xinnanbao	新南堡村	新南堡村	Xīnnánbǎo Cūn	New Southern Rampart Village
Xinzhuang	新庄村	新莊村	Xīnzhuāngcūn	New Grange Village
Yanbi	闫壁村	閆壁村	Yánbìcūn	Yan Rampart Village

== Economy ==
In the early years of Pingyao, the city played a notable part in the workings of China's Wall Street. By late 18th century to early 19th century China, much past the time of ancient dynasties, travel across the northern plains of China was no safe task. Merchants were frequently robbed when traveling to Pingyao which resided between the imperial Xi'an and what is now Beijing, making it a vital trade route. To solve this problem, Pingyao merchants introduced the use of paper remittances or bonds, in order to relieve traveling merchants from carrying gold and silver, making travel much safer. Pingyao being a conduit for trade in China led to skyrocketing wealth among many families including the Qiao family (mentioned in architecture section).

As of 2009, the town had a labour pool of 19,059 people. 3,811 farmers worked 9977 mu (613 ha or 1,510 acres) of arable land, producing 33.7m RMB of crops, livestock, and other goods. The local focus is on increased mechanization and working the available land intensively. The area is well known for its beef and also produces grain and cotton.The rest of the workforce is divided between industry and the service sector, particularly tourism. Industry produced 840m RMB and was focused on improving the energy efficiency of its practices. A local specialty is lacquerware. The service sector, including tourism, produced less income than industry—790m RMB–but was growing rapidly and marked for special focus by local government.

=== Tourism ===
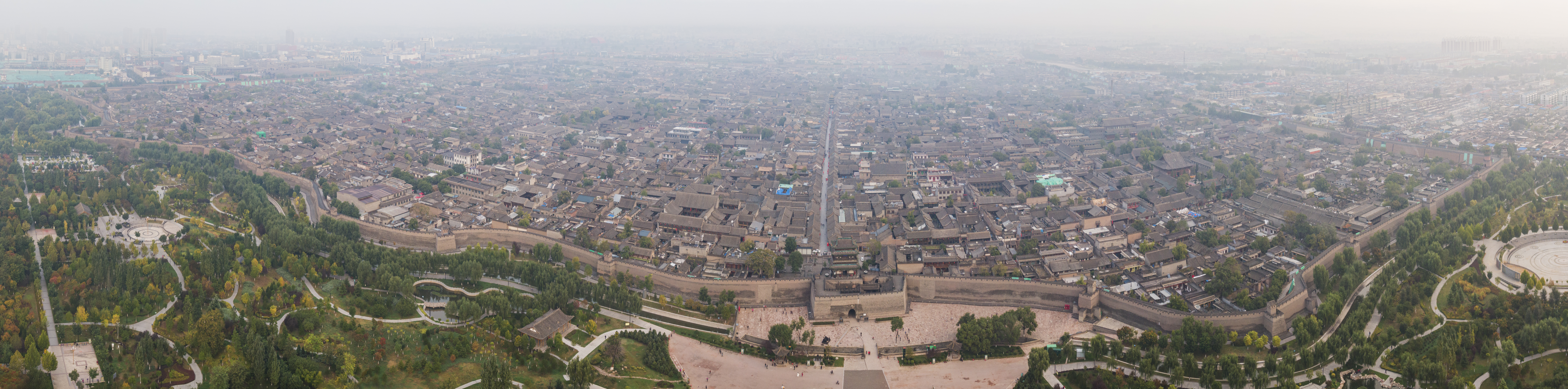
Aerial panorama of the town

Pingyao Ancient City is located 90 kilometers south of Taiyuan, Shanxi, and is one of the world historical and cultural heritage sites approved by the United Nations. Pingyao Ancient City is the most well preserved prototype of an ancient Chinese county town from the Ming and Qing dynasties in China. It is a large ancient architectural complex composed of complete city walls, streets, shops, temples, and residential buildings, reflecting the historical style of the Ming and Qing dynasties.

Increases in tourism have put pressure on Pingyao. During China's Golden Weeks, the number of visitors to the city has sometimes been as high as 2½ times its planned maximum capacity. During the single week around May Day in 2007, the town made about 94.5m RMB from visiting tourists.

Since that high point in 2007, the government has reduced the number and length of China's "golden weeks", spreading domestic tourism more equitably throughout the year. The Global Heritage Fund has also worked with the Pingyao County People's Government to protect the town against overdevelopment and damage from its high volume of visitors. The stated goal for their Pingyao Cultural Heritage Development Program is improved preservation of local vernacular architecture and traditional arts through improved planning and increased conservation efforts.

== Culture ==
=== Art ===
==== Lacquerware ====
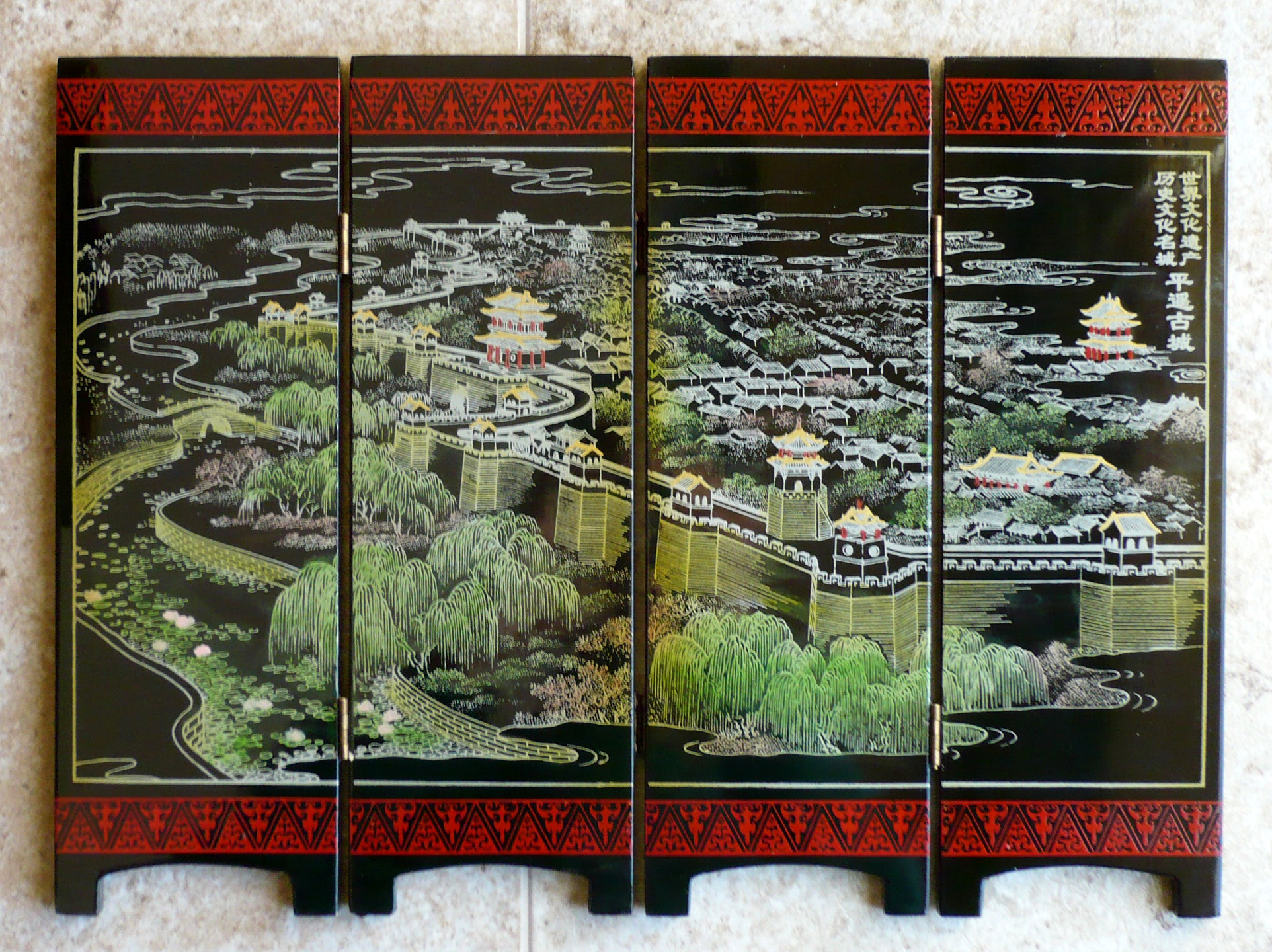
A Pingyao lacquer screen

Pingyao is the centre of a distinctive lacquer tradition known as tuiguang lacquerware (推光漆器), literally "push-light lacquer", so named because the final mirror gloss is raised not by varnish but by repeatedly burnishing the surface by hand with the palm. Objects are built up from a wooden core and an ash-and-hide-glue ground, then coated with five to eight layers of natural raw lacquer (daqi); grounds are conventionally black, cinnabar red, apricot yellow or purple-green. Decorative techniques include gold-line painting (miaojin caihui), relief modelled in lacquer putty and sealed under translucent lacquer (duigu zhaoqi), carved fill, and inlay of mother-of-pearl and other materials. The ware is conventionally grouped with the lacquer of Fuzhou, Yangzhou and Chengdu as one of China's four major lacquer traditions, and local accounts trace the craft to the Tang dynasty, with its commercial peak in the Ming and Qing alongside the rise of the Shanxi merchants. The State Council inscribed the Pingyao tuiguang lacquer decoration technique on the first national list of intangible cultural heritage in May 2006 (item Ⅷ-51). The craftsman Xue Shengjin, recognised as a national representative bearer of the tradition in 2011, is credited with reviving the lapsed duigu zhaoqi method in the 1960s and with developing further techniques. The ware received protected geographical indication status in 2011, and in 2015 the China Arts and Crafts Association designated Pingyao the "home of tuiguang lacquerware". A dedicated museum of the craft operates in the county.

==== Shage Xiren ====
Shage xiren (纱阁戏人) is tableaux of painted clay opera figures set inside gauze-fronted wooden cases. The surviving set was made in 1906 by Xu Liting, an artisan of the Liuhezhai paper-crafts shop, and was commissioned by the local draft-bank merchants; 28 of the original 36 cases survive and are held at the Qingxu Temple. Each case, roughly 70 cm high, stages a climactic moment from a named opera with three or four figures about 50 cm tall, modelled in clay over frames of wood and sorghum stalk and dressed in silk, fur and cotton, with mineral pigments used throughout. The cases were formerly displayed in the passageways of the Market Tower at the centre of the walled city during the New Year and Lantern Festival shehuo celebrations. The tradition was inscribed on the national intangible cultural heritage list in 2008.

=== Cuisine ===
Local specialties include Pingyao beef (平遥牛肉, Píngyáo niúròu) and wantuo (平遥碗托, Píngyáo wǎntuō), a favorite of the Empress Dowager Cixi. Other local products are Changshengyuan rice wine (长升源黄酒), bean flour Minjian (豆面抿尖), and Jiupian (揪片).

=== Film and photography ===
Pingyao hosts the Pingyao International Film Festival and the Pingyao International Photography Festival, reflecting the city’s role as a site of contemporary visual culture alongside its historic urban heritage. Besides, the silver merchants of Pingyao in the early 20th century were the subject of the 2009 film Empire of Silver.

== Conservation ==
There is currently an ongoing effort to conserve and revitalize the ancient city in terms of preserving the long standing heritage of the city as well as acknowledging the modern needs an aging city such as Pingyao needs. The Conservation and Revitalisation Programme of the Ancient City of Ping Yao was initially proposed and approved in 2014 and has received a vast number of groups interested in working together in order to meet a series of objectives, including: Tongji University, Pingyao County People's Government and Bureau of Natural Resources as well as the Global Heritage Fund and UNESCO experts. One such objective of the project is to introduce modern amenities to the 2.4 square km area encompassing the heritage site including electricity and sewage in order to improve standard of living among the 20,000+ individuals who still live and work within the ancient city. The primary objective is to repurpose several unused sites within the ruins of the ancient city to be used as museums and other functions to revitalize the heritage of Pingyao.

== Gallery ==
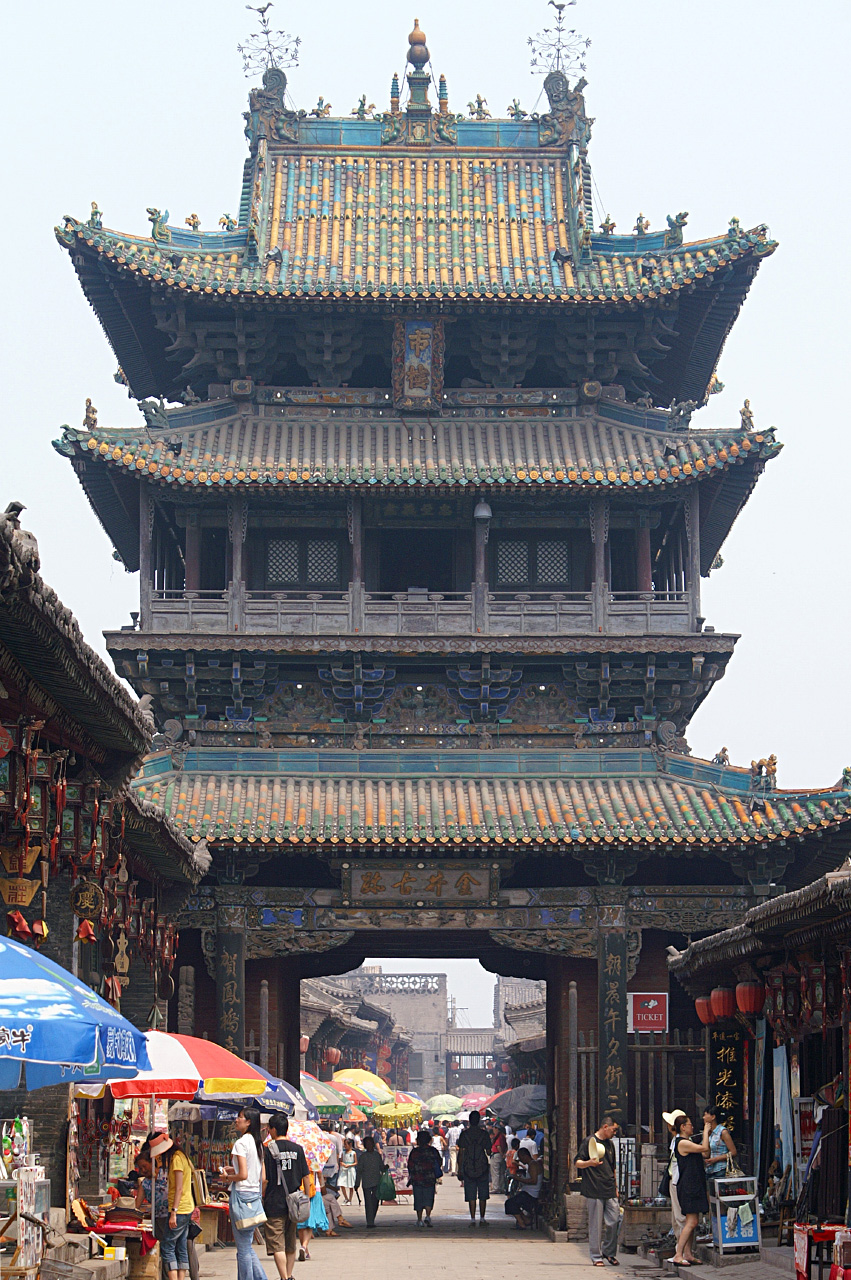
Market Tower, constructed in 14th century

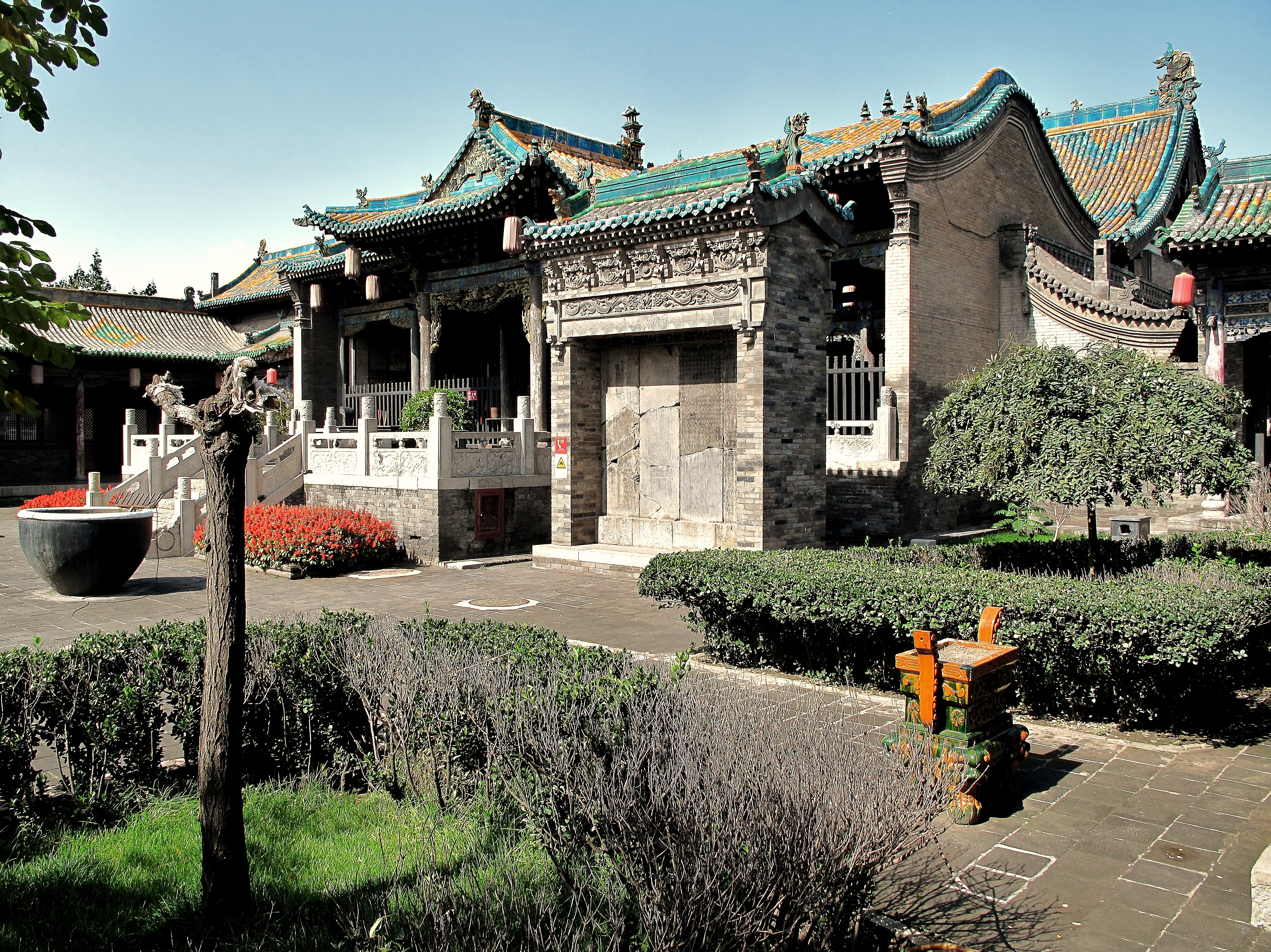
Qingxuguan (清虚观), a daoist temple in Pingyao

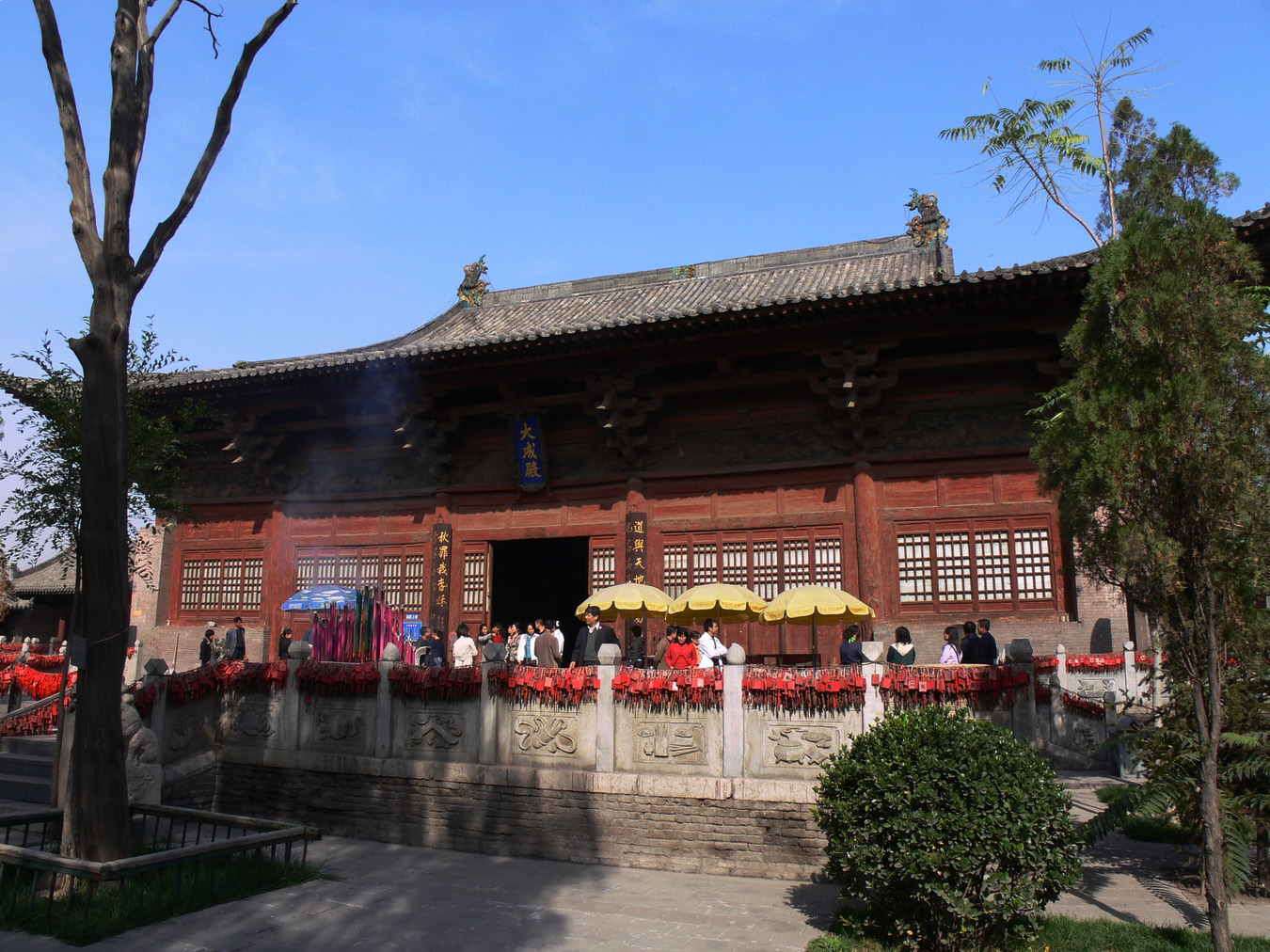
The Confucius Temple of Pingyao

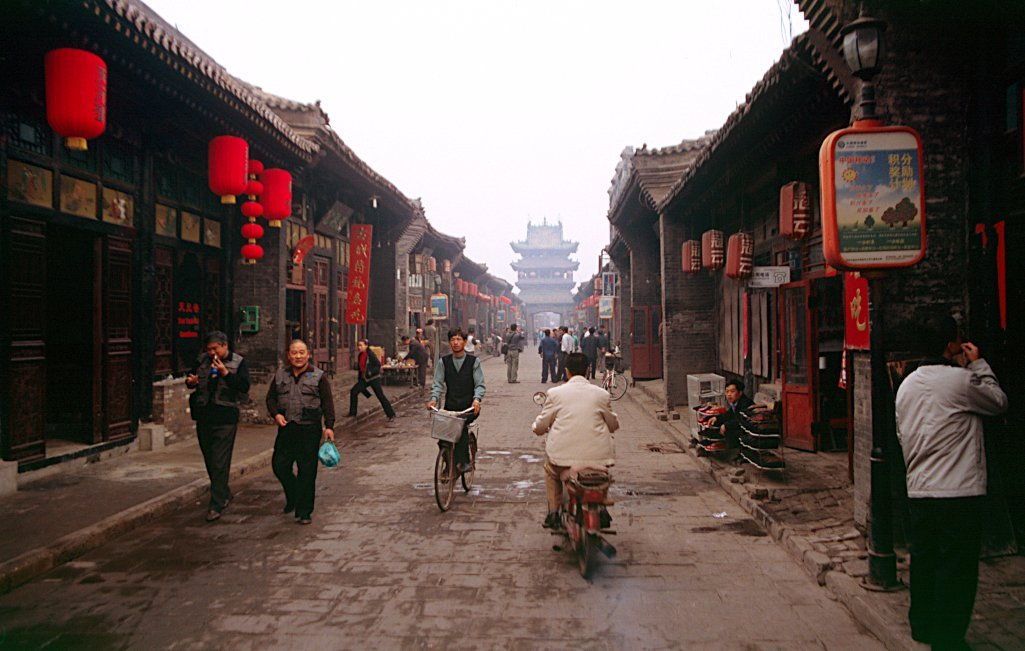
A street in Pingyao

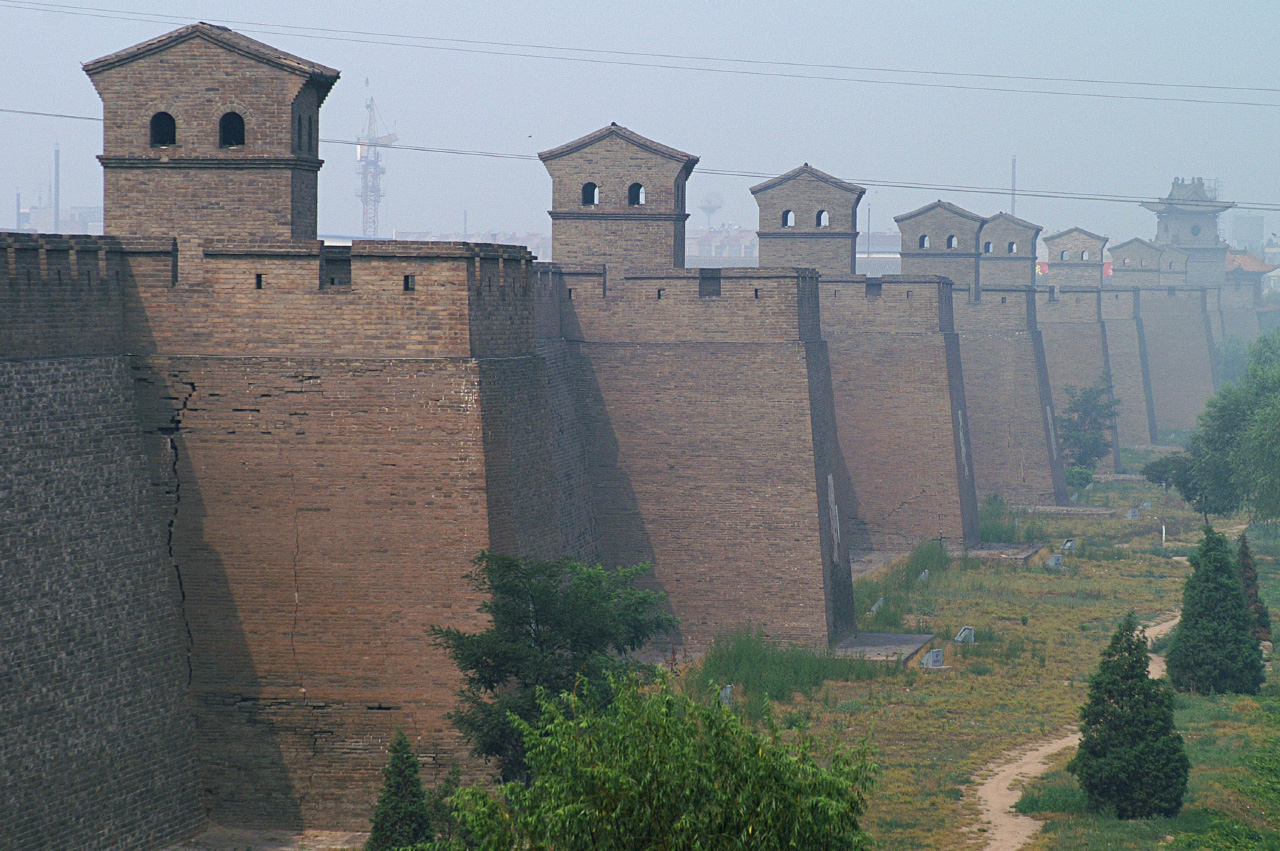
City walls of Pingyao

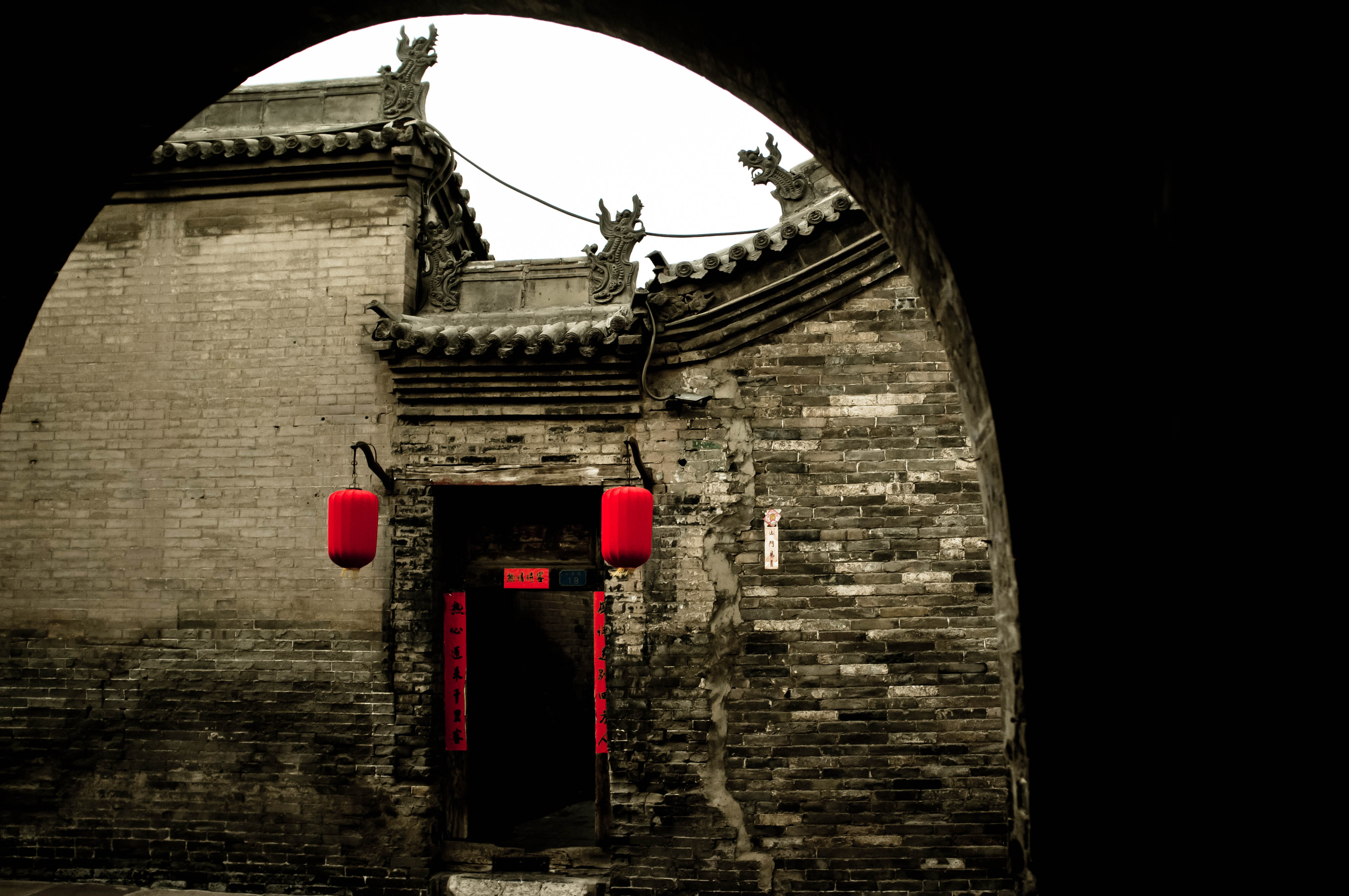
The gate of a courtyard

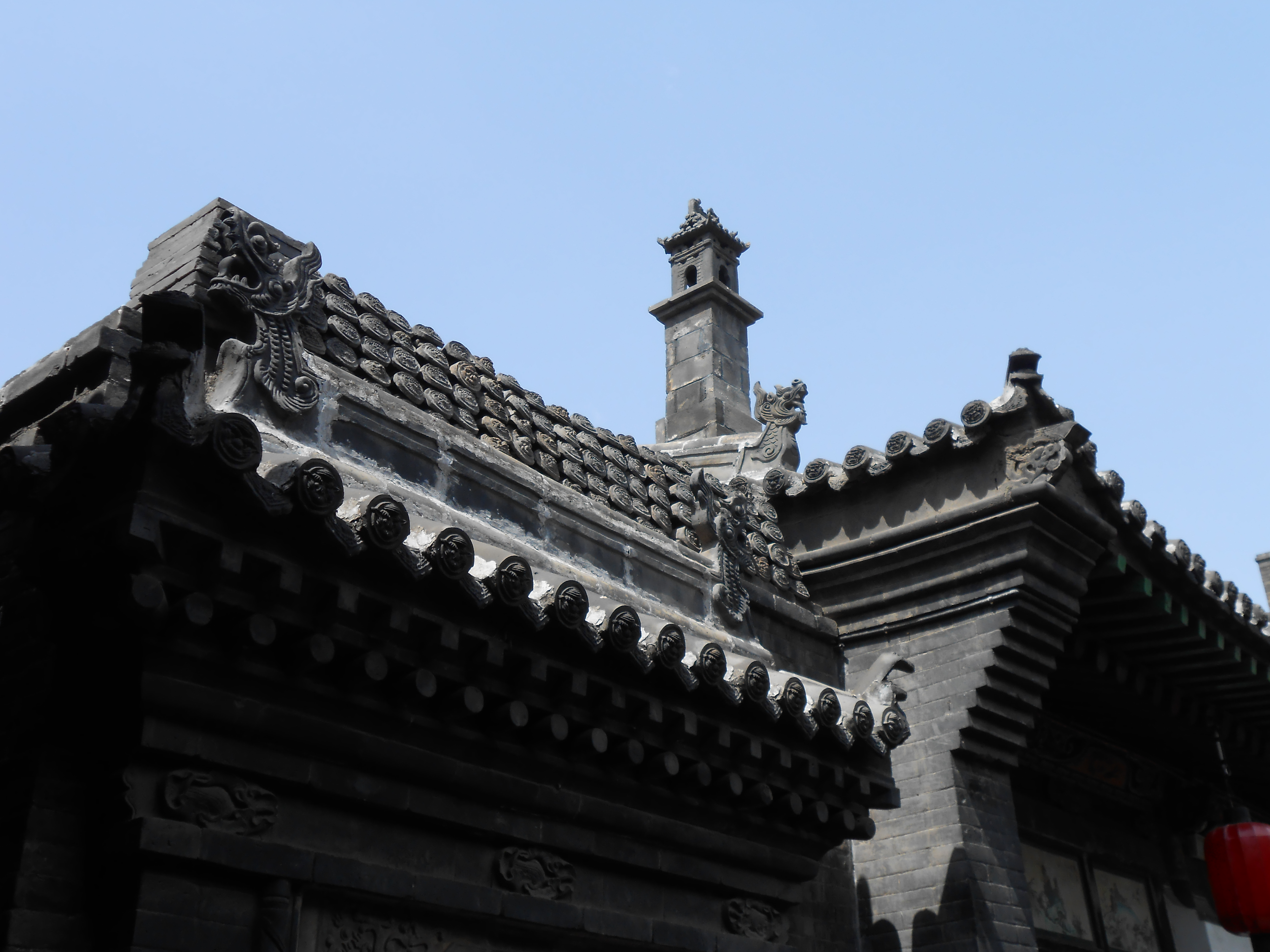
Roof architecture

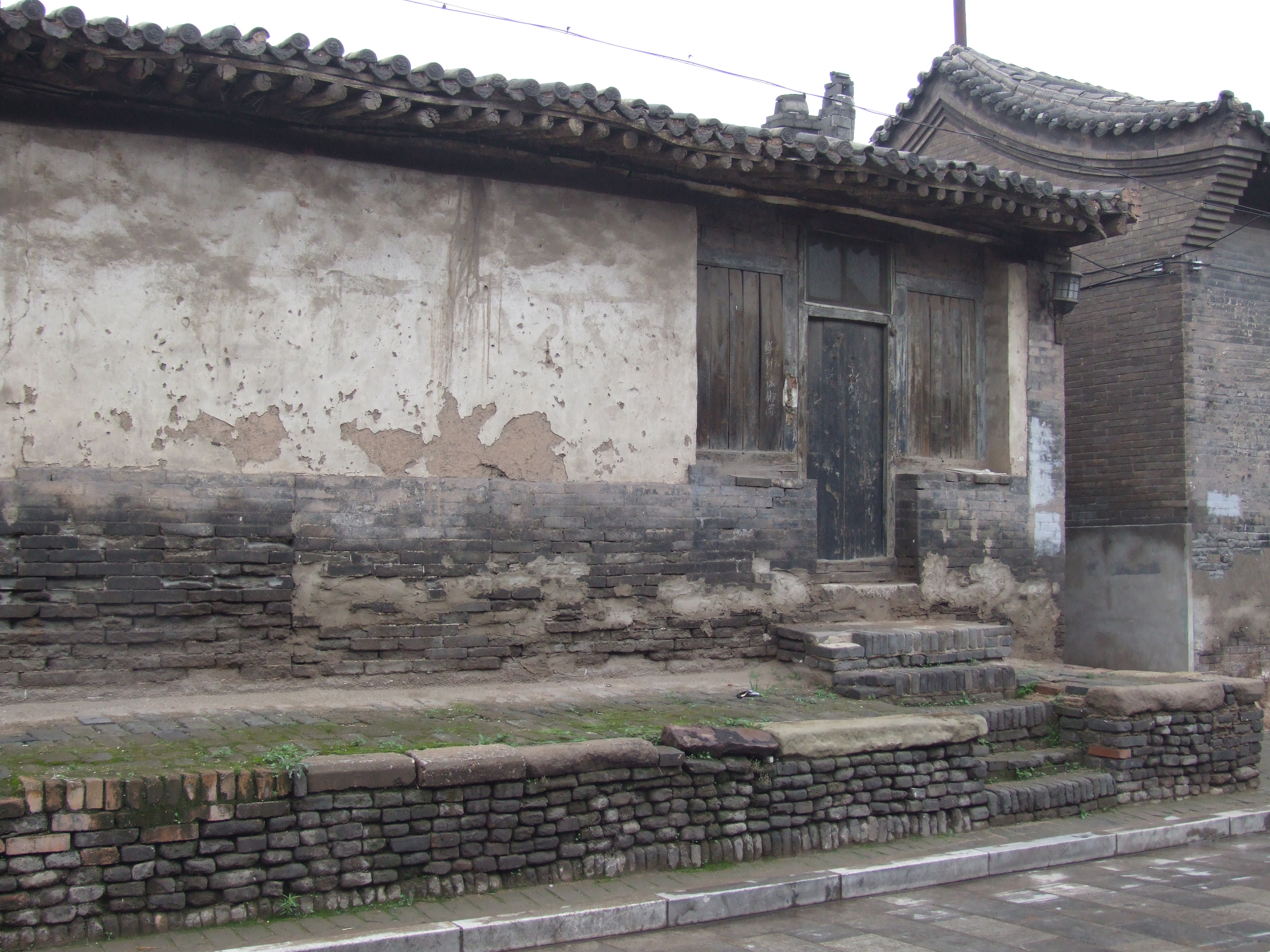
Courtyard by the street in Pingyao

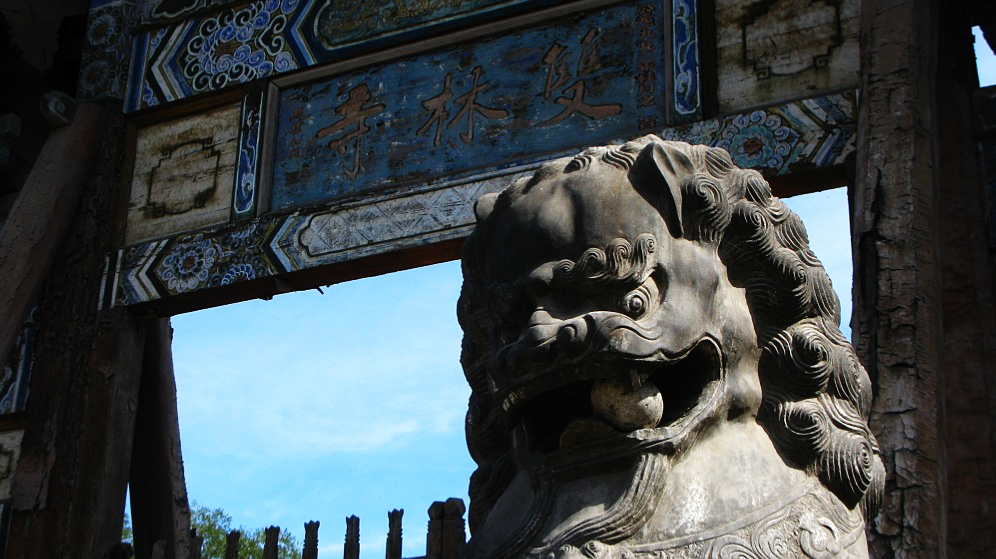
Gate of Shuanglin Temple

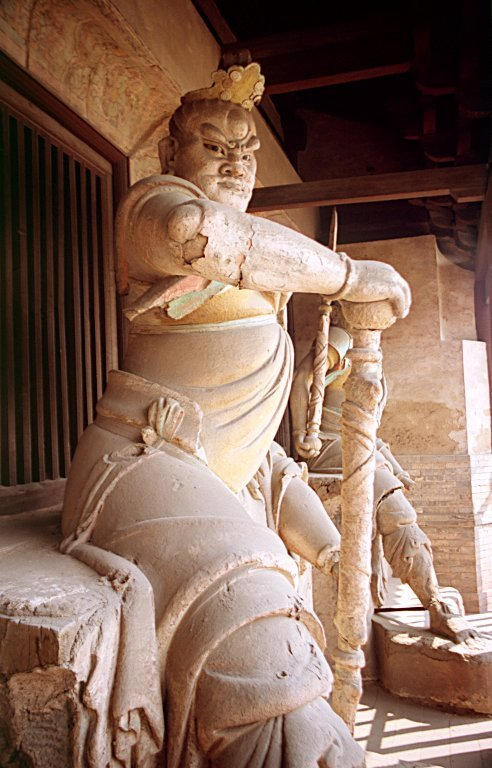
Polychrome statue of a Heavenly King (Tianwang) at Shuanglin Temple

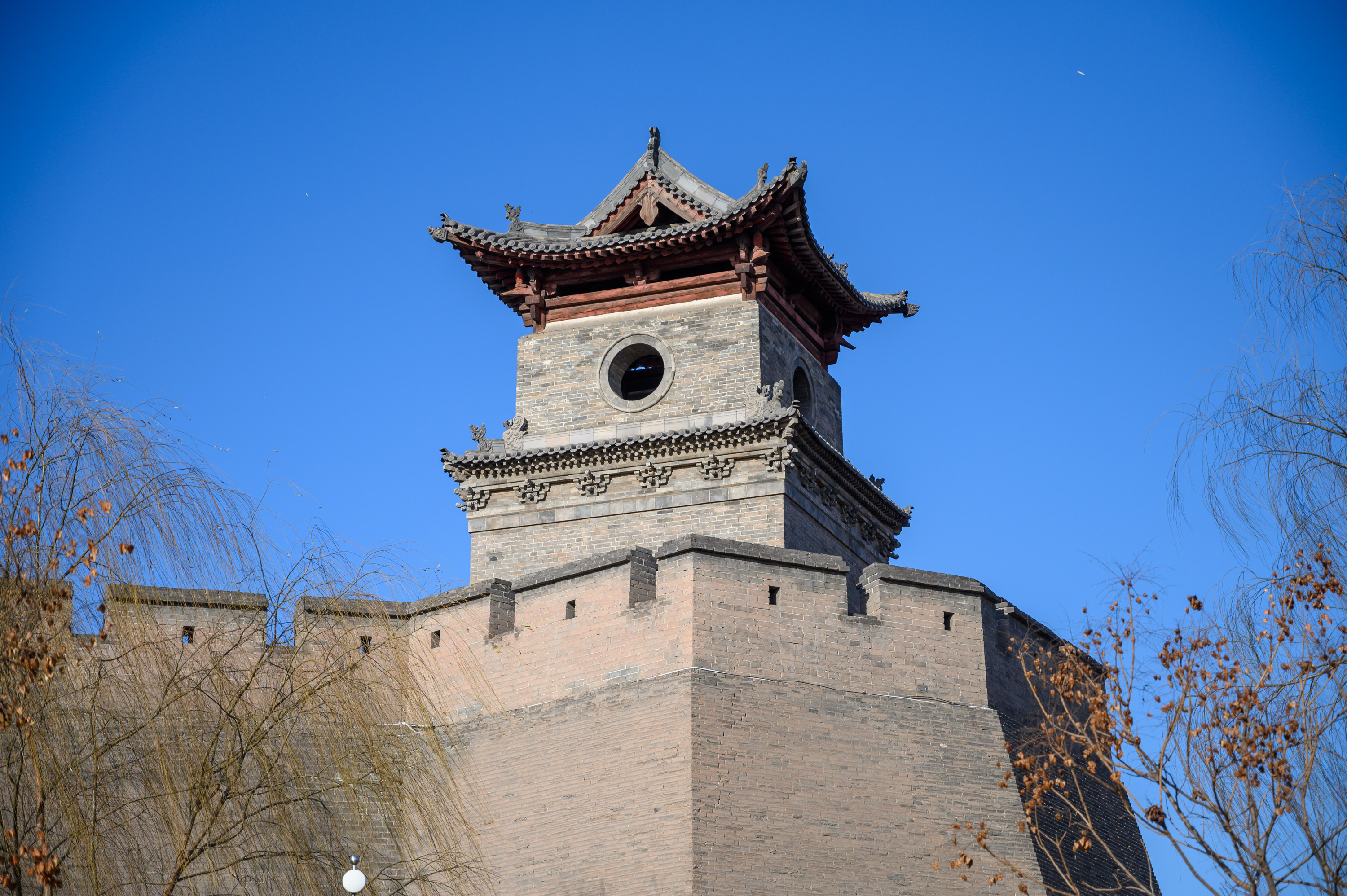
A corner tower of the city wall

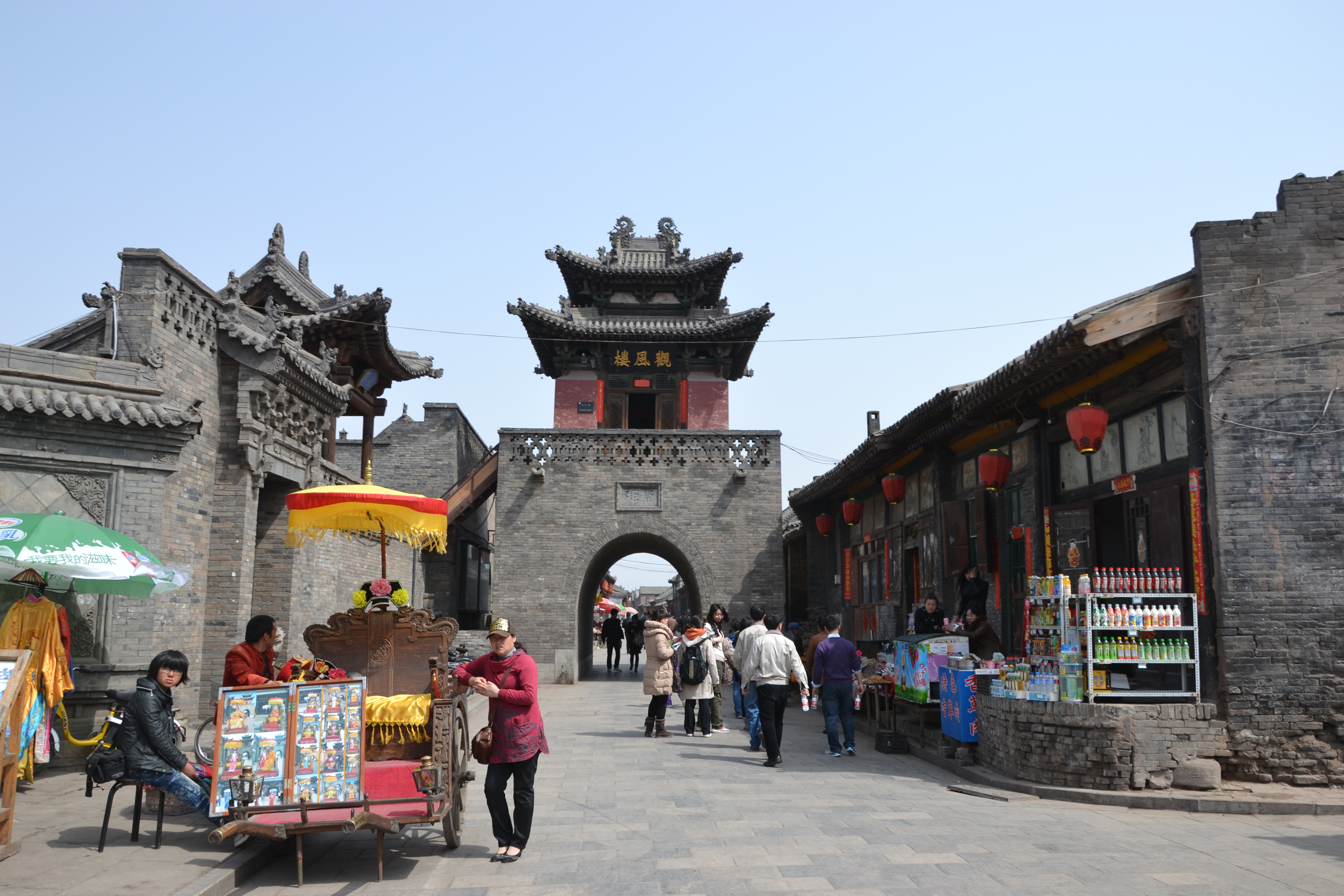
A street in Pingyao
