= N. Thiagarajan =

Indian photojournalist and photographer

N. Thiagarajan (1933–2008) was an Indian photojournalist and photographer who described himself as "a pictorial photojournalist".

From 2002 to 2004 he was a member of the Press Council of India but it was in the field, as a practising photojournalist, and later as photo-editor, that N. Thiagarajan made his name. For many years he worked for The Hindustan Times but spent time at The Hindu, Sport and Pastime and the Times of India.

He said: "I have always said that a photojournalist or a journalist should be committed to journalism, but should not be a ‘committed journalist’. Like many embedded war photographers or correspondents,”.

His break came in 1955 with the visit to India of the Soviet leadership, Nikita Khrushchev and his Prime Minister Nikolai Bulganin. He went on to photograph many of the great names of world politics, including Fidel Castro, Indira Gandhi and Jawaharlal Nehru. He covered the 1971 war, in Bangladesh, where Kishore Parekh and Raghu Rai were also active, and the Bhopal gas tragedy.

He also wanted to move away from portraying India in a negative manner, as a land of beggars and snake charmers. "I want to show that real India exists far away from all of this. The rich cultural heritage and the diversity of the country is what I wanted to portray in my images," he said.
