= Qi County, Shanxi =

Qixian 祁县
- County
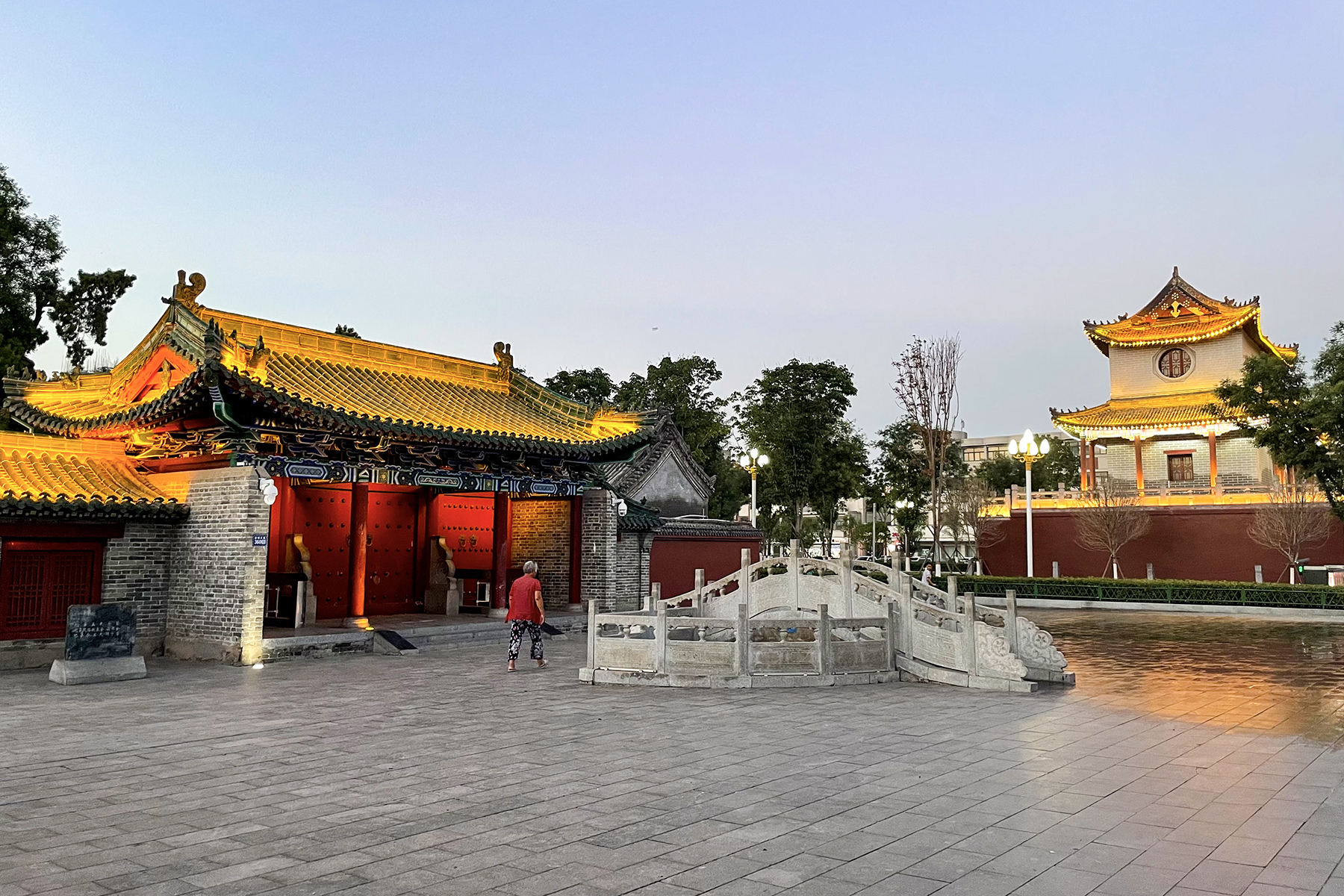
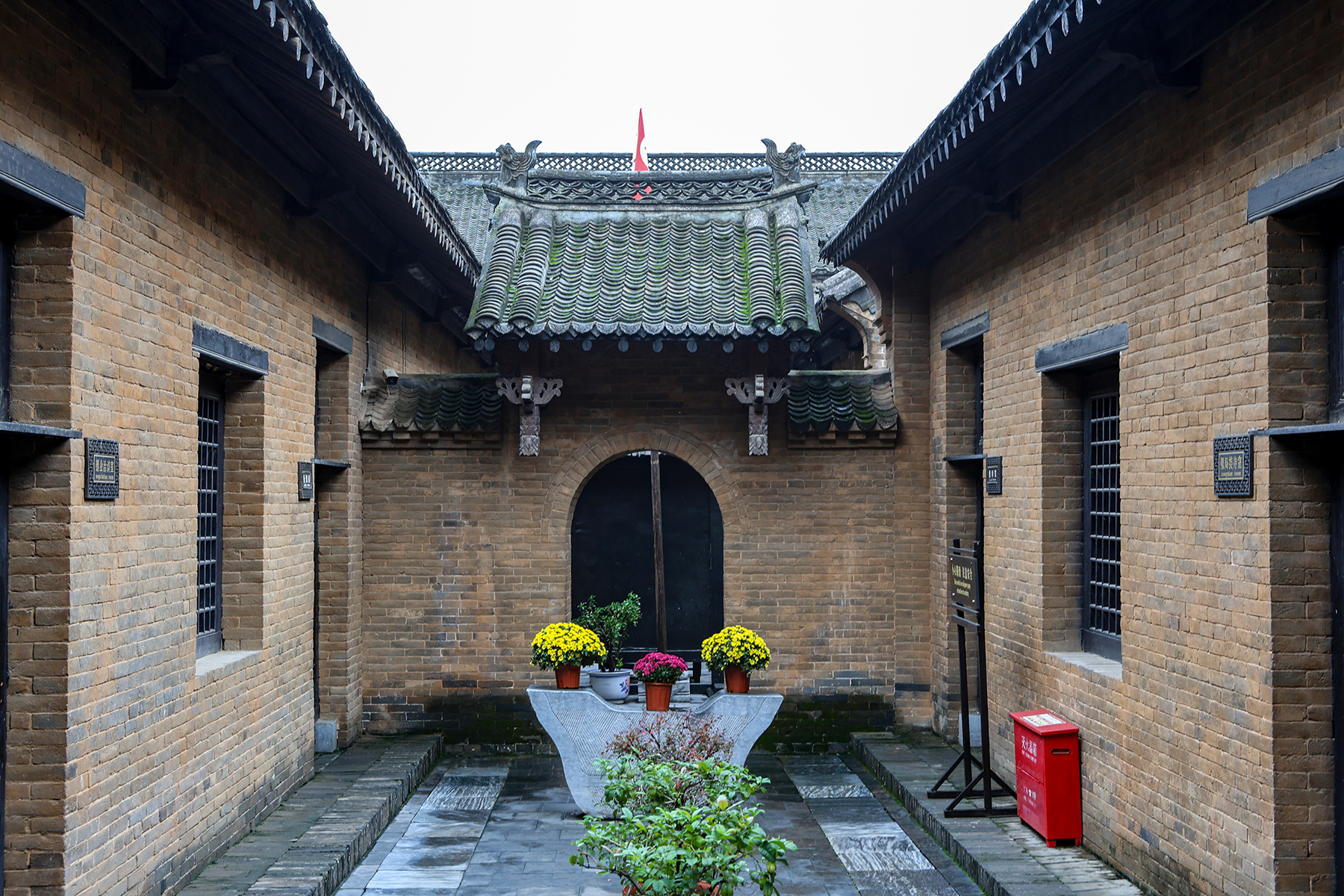
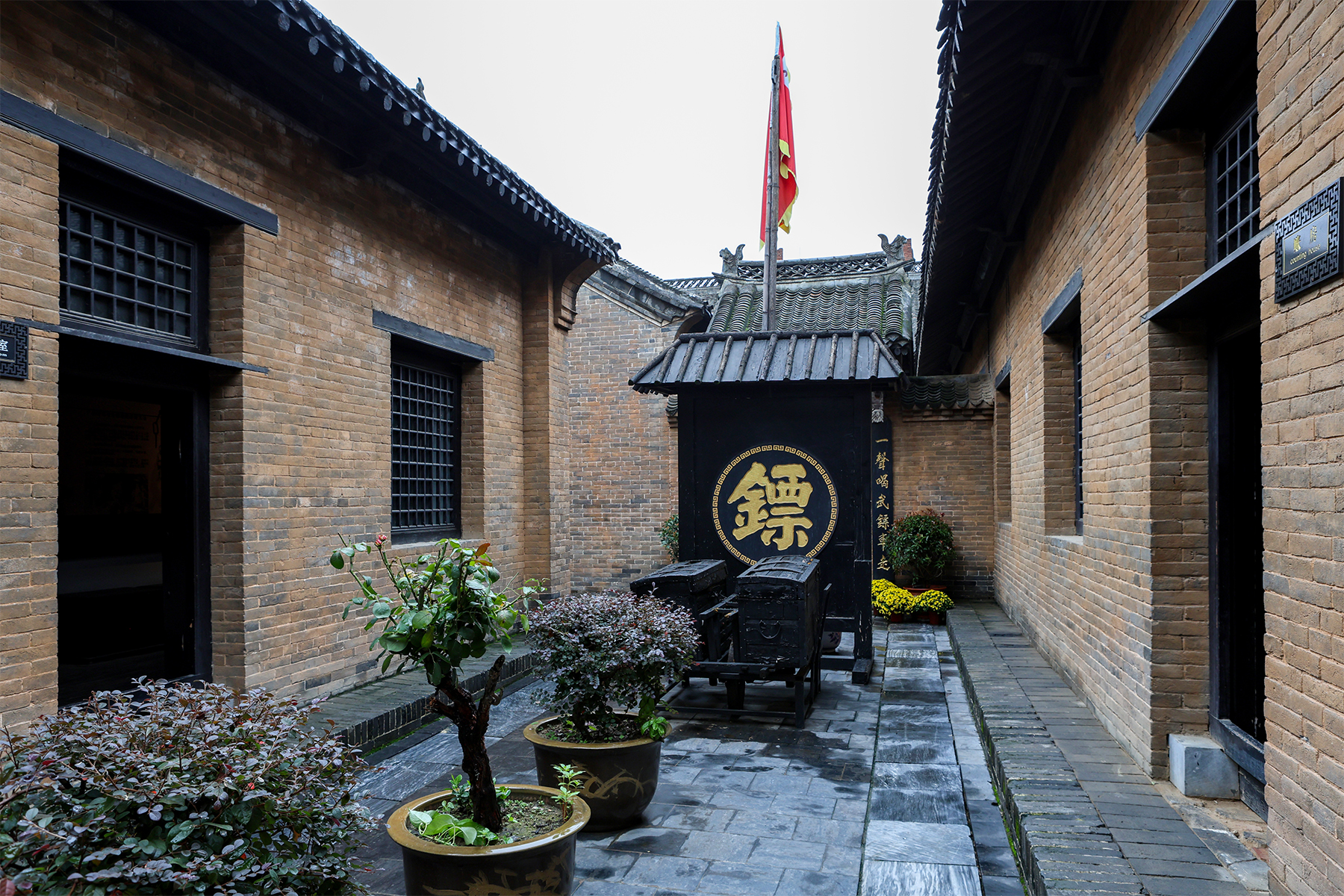

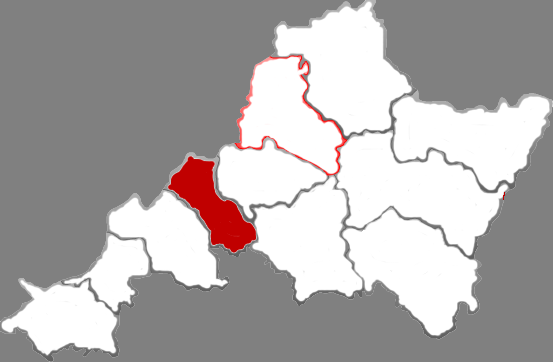

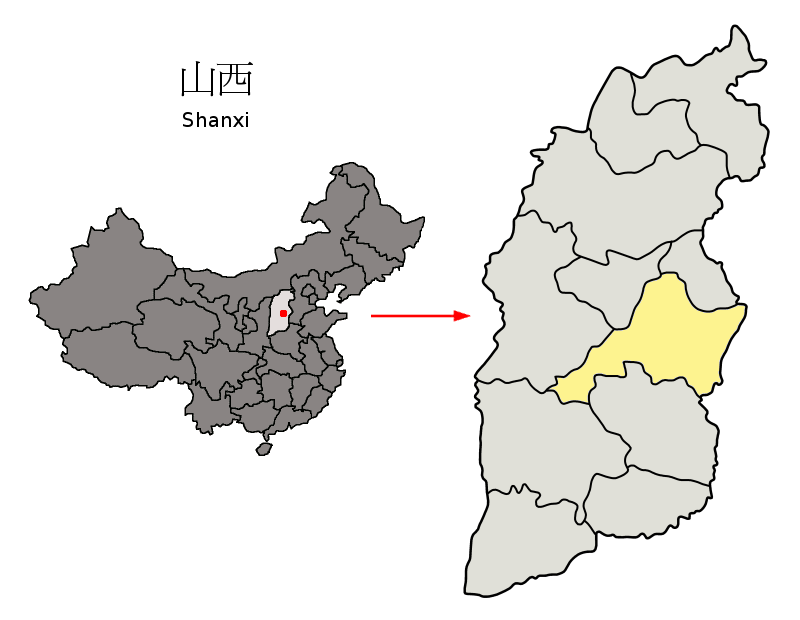
- Jinzhong in Shanxi
- Coordinates: 37°21′30″N 112°20′07″E
- Country: People's Republic of China
- Province: Shanxi
- Prefecture-level city: Jinzhong

Area
  - Total: 854 km^{2} (330 sq mi)

Population (2010 census)
  - Total: 265,310
  - Density: 311/km^{2} (805/sq mi)
- Time zone: UTC+8 (China Standard)
- Postal code: 030900
- Area code: 0354

Qi County, Shanxi
- Traditional Chinese: 祁縣
- Simplified Chinese: 祁县
- Literal meaning: Vast County
Transcriptions
Standard Mandarin
- Hanyu Pinyin: Qíxiàn
- Wade–Giles: Ch‘i Hsien

Qi County, also known by its Chinese name Qixian, is a county in the central part of Shanxi Province, China. It is under the administration of the prefecture-level city of Jinzhong and has a population of approximately 265,310.

The county is on the route of the Datong-Puzhou Railway, the primary axial railway of Shanxi Province, which links it to Datong (approximately 7.5 hours) and the provincial capital Taiyuan (approximately 1.5 hours away).

The county seat, also named Qixian, is designated as a National Historic and Cultural City. The county is home to the Qiao and Qu Family Compounds and is nearby the UNESCO World Heritage Site of Pingyao.

== Climate ==
Climate data for Qixian, elevation 769 m (2,523 ft), (1991–2020 normals, extremes 1981–2010)
Month	Jan	Feb	Mar	Apr	May	Jun	Jul	Aug	Sep	Oct	Nov	Dec	Year
Record high °C (°F)	13.3 (55.9)	21.8 (71.2)	29.7 (85.5)	37.4 (99.3)	37.4 (99.3)	41.0 (105.8)	38.5 (101.3)	38.7 (101.7)	37.1 (98.8)	30.0 (86.0)	23.7 (74.7)	18.2 (64.8)	41.0 (105.8)
Mean daily maximum °C (°F)	2.7 (36.9)	7.2 (45.0)	13.9 (57.0)	21.2 (70.2)	26.8 (80.2)	30.3 (86.5)	30.9 (87.6)	29.0 (84.2)	24.6 (76.3)	18.6 (65.5)	10.6 (51.1)	3.9 (39.0)	18.3 (65.0)
Daily mean °C (°F)	−4.5 (23.9)	−0.4 (31.3)	6.3 (43.3)	13.5 (56.3)	19.2 (66.6)	23.0 (73.4)	24.6 (76.3)	22.8 (73.0)	17.7 (63.9)	11.2 (52.2)	3.6 (38.5)	−2.7 (27.1)	11.2 (52.2)
Mean daily minimum °C (°F)	−10.2 (13.6)	−6.4 (20.5)	−0.3 (31.5)	6.1 (43.0)	11.6 (52.9)	16.1 (61.0)	19.1 (66.4)	17.7 (63.9)	12.0 (53.6)	5.2 (41.4)	−1.9 (28.6)	−7.8 (18.0)	5.1 (41.2)
Record low °C (°F)	−23.1 (−9.6)	−23.5 (−10.3)	−13.1 (8.4)	−7.1 (19.2)	−0.1 (31.8)	6.1 (43.0)	10.9 (51.6)	7.6 (45.7)	−0.7 (30.7)	−8.3 (17.1)	−21.7 (−7.1)	−25.6 (−14.1)	−25.6 (−14.1)
Average precipitation mm (inches)	2.7 (0.11)	4.1 (0.16)	9.0 (0.35)	24.8 (0.98)	27.7 (1.09)	42.8 (1.69)	105.9 (4.17)	87.0 (3.43)	59.4 (2.34)	32.7 (1.29)	13.0 (0.51)	2.5 (0.10)	411.6 (16.22)
Average precipitation days (≥ 0.1 mm)	2.0	2.6	3.7	5.4	6.4	9.0	11.8	10.2	8.2	6.5	3.7	1.7	71.2
Average snowy days	2.9	3.3	2.2	0.6	0	0	0	0	0	0.1	2.1	2.5	13.7
Average relative humidity (%)	51	48	44	46	48	56	69	73	71	65	59	53	57
Mean monthly sunshine hours	156.6	169.6	209.8	237.5	262.7	239.8	223.7	212.6	188.2	185.7	160.7	153.0	2,399.9
Percentage possible sunshine	51	55	56	60	60	55	50	51	51	54	53	52	54
Source: China Meteorological Administration
