= Thiyagi =

- Directed by: Ramjibhai Arya; S. R. Krishna Ayyangar
- Written by: S. R. Krishna Ayyangar
- Story by: S. R. Krishna Ayyangar
- Starring: V. N. Janaki; N. Krishnamurthi; V.S. Mani; Stunt Somu; K. Devanarayanan
- Music by: S. V. Venkatraman; T. R. Ramanathan
- Production company: Moorthi Productions
- Release date: 22 August 1947 (India)
- Running time: 2 hrs. 20 mins. (12700 ft.)
- Country: India
- Language: Tamil

Thiyagi (transl. Martyr) is a 1947 Indian Tamil-language film directed by Ramjibhai Arya and S. R. Krishna Ayyangar and featured V. N. Janaki and N. Krishnamurthi in the lead roles.

== Plot ==
The story is about a dalit girl and the son of a wealthy Zamindar who was educated abroad. He falls in love with her. The girl is prevented from entering a temple by the priest. She undergoes various difficulties in life owing to the low-status of her caste. The film exposed the difficulties faced by oppressed people including proscription from entering temples.

== Cast ==
The following list is adapted from The Hindu article and from the database of Film News Anandan.

- V. N. Janaki
- N. Krishnamurthi
- V. S. Mani
- Stunt Somu
- K. Devanarayanan
- K. S. Angamuthu
- Thodi Kannan
- Kolathu Mani
- T. V. Sethuraman
- C. K. Nagaratnam
- V. Saroja

== Soundtrack ==
Music was composed by S. V. Venkatraman and T. R. Ramanathan while the lyrics were penned by Papanasam Rajagopala Iyer. The songs had a patriotic theme with social values and were acclaimed by the people.

== Reception ==
The film fared well at the box office and is remembered for the performance of V. N. Janaki and for the songs with social themed lyrics and pleasing music.
