= Qiao Family Compound =

Courtyard house in China

- 乔家大院
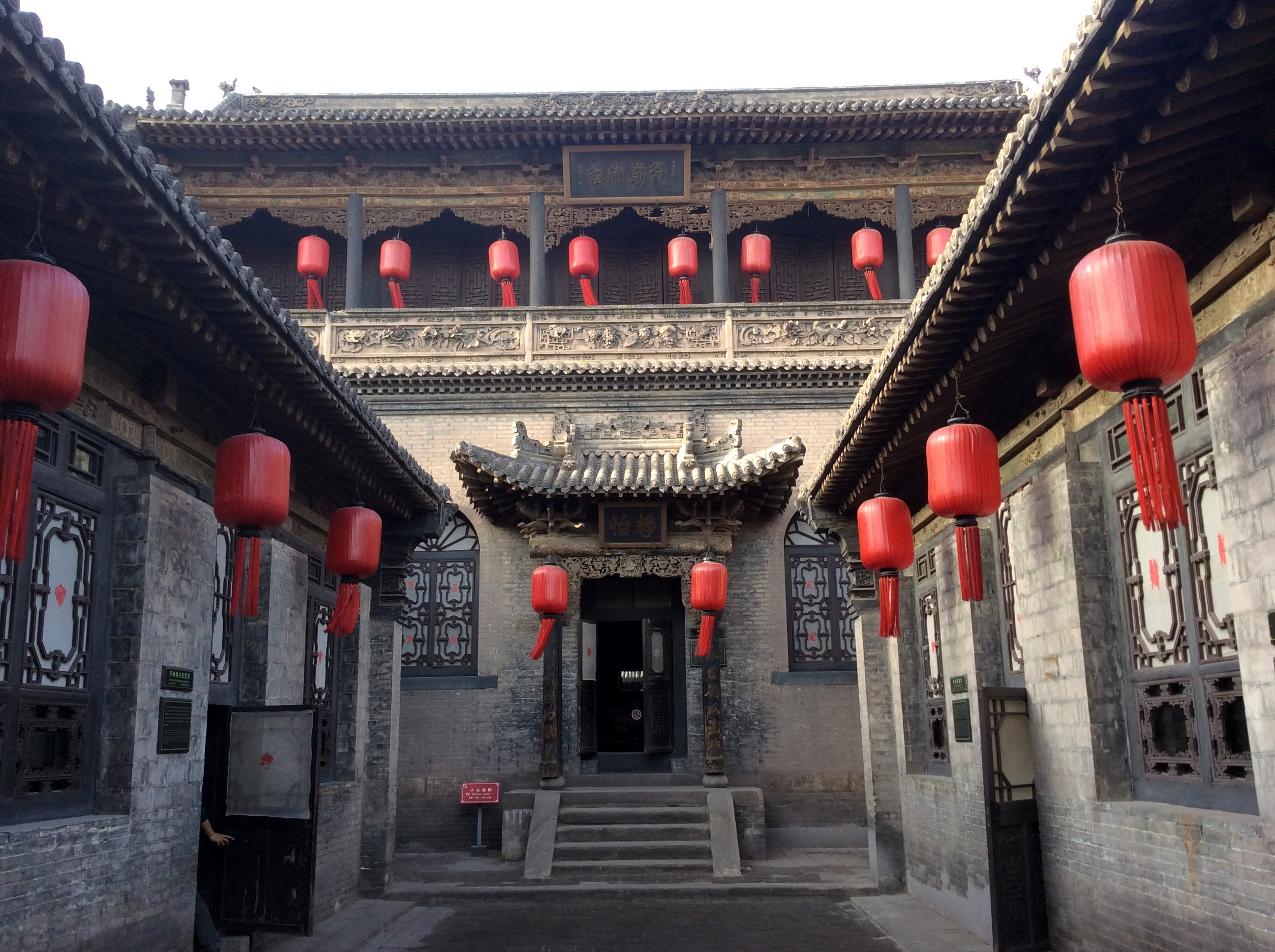
- The Jingyi House of the Qiao Family Compound

- Location within Shanxi

General information
- Location: Qi County, Shanxi, China
- Coordinates: 37°24′21.86″N 112°25′47.93″E

Qiao Family Compound
- Traditional Chinese: 喬家大院
- Simplified Chinese: 乔家大院
- Literal meaning: The Qiao Family's Courtyard House
Transcriptions
Standard Mandarin
- Hanyu Pinyin: Qiáojiā Dàyuàn
- Wade–Giles: Ch‘iao-chia Ta-yüan

Zaizhong Hall
- Chinese: 在中堂
- Literal meaning: Middle Hall
Transcriptions
Standard Mandarin
- Hanyu Pinyin: Zàizhōng Táng
- Wade–Giles: Tsai-chung T‘ang

The Qiao Family Compound, originally the Zaizhong Hall and officially Qiao's Grand Courtyard, is a courtyard house located in Qi County, Jinzhong Prefecture, Shanxi Province, China, approximately 30 kilometers (20 mi) northeast of Pingyao. It is the residential compound of financier Qiao Zhiyong (乔致庸/喬致庸, 1818—1907), who was the most famous member of the Qiao family. Construction began in 1756 during the reign of the Qianlong Emperor in the Qing dynasty and was completed sometime in the 18th century. The estate covers 9,000 square metres (97,000 sq ft) and has 313 rooms with 4,000 square metres (43,000 sq ft) within 6 large courtyards and 19 smaller courtyards.

Architects consider it to be one of the finest remaining examples of imposing private residences in northern China. It has been converted into a museum and has many period furnishings.

It is the chief location in the Zhang Yimou film Raise the Red Lantern. A 2006 Chinese television series, Qiao's Grand Courtyard, was also shot here.

== See also ==
- Siheyuan
- Shanxi courtyard houses
