= Xiechi Lake =

- 解池 (Chinese)
- Location within Shanxi
- Location: Yanhu District, Yuncheng, Shanxi
- Coordinates: 34.977222°N 110.987222°E
- Type: saline lake
- Basin countries: China

Xiechi Lake (Chinese: 解池), also called Yuncheng yanchi (Yuncheng Salt Lake) is the largest natural lake in Shanxi in Northern China. It is a saline lake used for production of salt.

In the summertime intense light and heat cause the algae Dunaliella salina to produce carotenoids as a protection against free radicals, due in turn to high metabolism. This turns the salt pans brilliant shades of violet, scarlet, magenta, and emerald (see photo in reference).

== Historical significance ==
The most plausible explanation of the financial prominence of the province of Shanxi during the Ming and Qing dynasties states that its salt works at Xiechi Lake fostered mercantile activity that would ultimately need banks, these banks would become the piaohao. An imperial government salt monopoly persisted, with only a few minor interruptions, from the Han dynasty until the year 1370 during the second year of the Ming dynasty. In 1370 the army of the Ming began using its salt rights, known as yan yin, which were initially redeemable only at the Xiechi Lake, to pay for transporting provisions to Chinese soldiers stationed on the Great Wall. As the Shanxi merchants were handling this lucrative business from its very beginnings, they managed to get a piece of the Ming state's monopoly and the imperial government quite likely netted more revenues of the salt monopoly because of higher overall efficiency. This policy that benefited the Shanxi merchants remained in effect long enough for them to accumulate a substantial amount of wealth for themselves, ultimately leading to their dominant position in the Chinese financial market during the Qing dynasty.
