= Cantonese merchants =

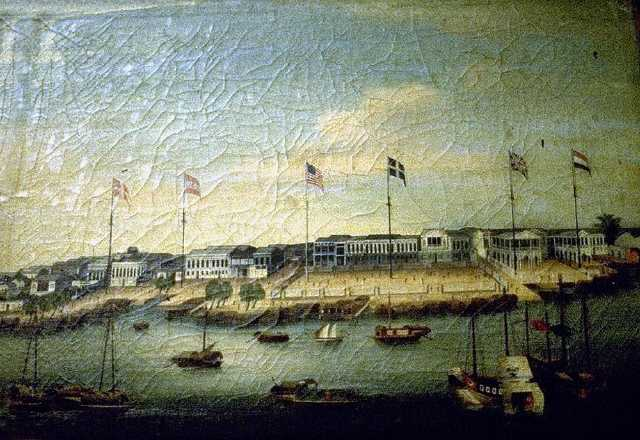
An oil painting from 1780; It shows the bases of merchants from various Western powers – Denmark, Spain, United States, Sweden, United Kingdom, and the Netherlands, established with Canton Factories.

Cantonese merchants (Chinese: 粵商; Jyutping: jyut6 soeng1) are merchants of Cantonese origin, though sometimes it is used to include Hakka and Teochew merchants who originated from the Southern Chinese province of Guangdong, where Cantonese people have been the dominant demographic. For most of the second millennium AD, some important ports of successive Chinese dynasties have been situated in Guangdong, resulting in the formation of a distinct business culture which many cultural studies and business scholars have sought to examine.

== Characteristics ==
Located in the southern fringe of China, far away from center of power, adjacent to Hong Kong and Macau, Cantonese merchants were the first to open up the market to Western European commerce and to accept economic and cultural exchange with Southeast Asia. As a result, a unique business culture emerged. According to scholars, the main characteristics of Cantonese merchants include:

- Eager to discover new market opportunities and adopt new technologies early compared to other Han Chinese merchant groups.
- Receptive to external talent, new techniques, and criticism, a trait observers suggest has enabled individuals from lower socioeconomic backgrounds to achieve commercial success.
- Favoring incremental growth and being cautious risk assessment.
- The owners often remain directly involved in daily shop management and maintenance even after their businesses expand.

== See also ==
- Cantonese culture
- Shanxi merchants
