= Rishengchang =

First draft bank in China

Rishengchang Piaohao
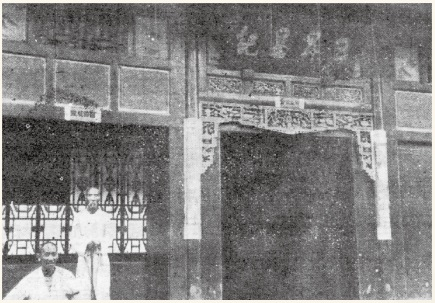
- The front gate of Rishengchang's headquarters, photographed during the Qing Dynasty.
- Native name: 日昇昌票號
- Formerly: Xiyucheng Dye Company (西裕成颜料庄)
- Type: Private
- Industry: Banking
- Founded: Pingyao, Shanxi, China (1823)
- Defunct: 1914
- Area served: China (nationwide); branches in Russia, Mongolia, and Japan

The Rishengchang Piaohao (simplified Chinese: 日升昌票号; traditional Chinese: 日昇昌票號; pinyin: Rì shēng chāng piào hào), was the first draft bank in China. It is located in Pingyao, Shanxi province, China. Rishengchang literally translates to 'Sunrise Prosperity', and piaohao means 'draft banks', the predecessors of modern banks in China. It was estimated to be founded during the Qing Dynasty in 1823. In the nineteenth century, at its peak, it controlled almost half of the Chinese economy and its branches were widespread throughout major cities in China, and also in some foreign countries, including Russia, Mongolia, and Japan.

The draft bank is now a museum and in 2006 was included on the List of Major National Historical and Cultural Sites (6-484).

== History ==
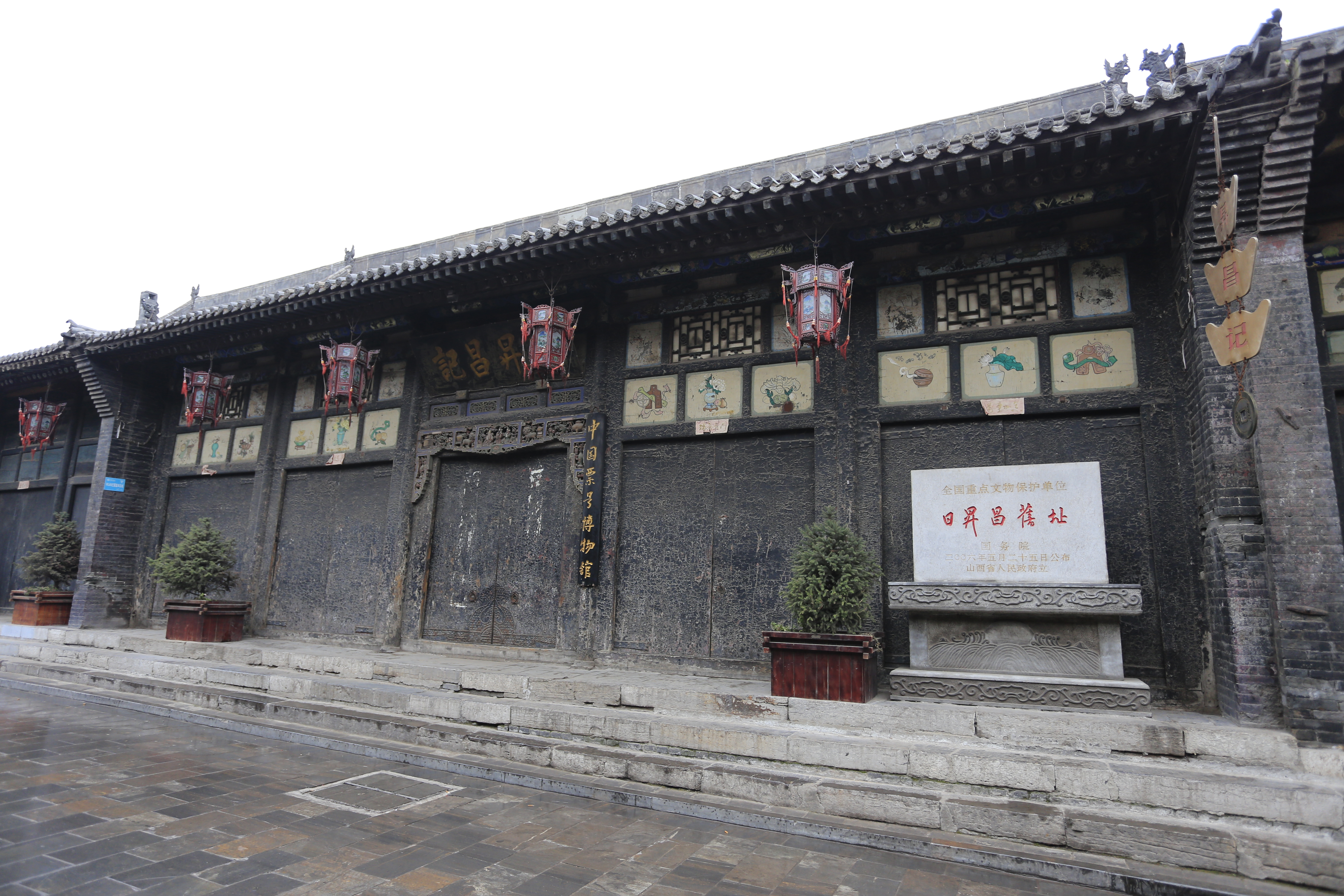
Front of the Rishengchang Bank in Pingyao, Shanxi

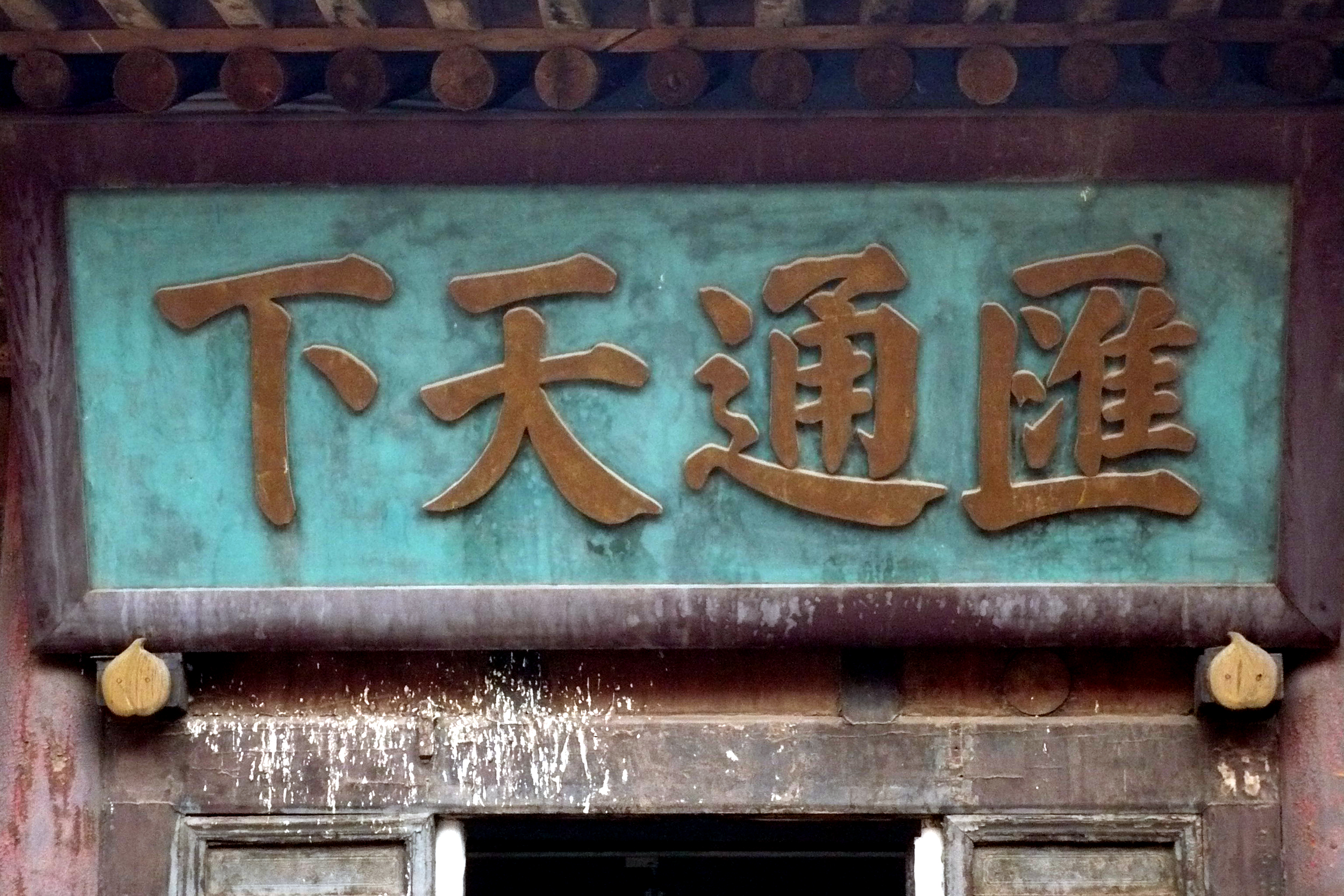
Royal inscribed board, saying "Financial exchange all over the world", in Rishengchang, Pingyao

Rishengchang, the first draft bank or piaohao (票號), originated from Xiyuecheng Dye Company Pingyao in central Shanxi. Rishengchang was estimated to be founded during the Qing Dynasty in 1823. However, the exact founding year remains controversial. Some scholars argue it was founded in 1797 or 1824. To deal with the transfer of large amounts of cash from one branch to another, the company introduced drafts, cashable in the company's many branches around China. Although this new method was originally designed for business transactions within the Xiyuecheng Company, it became so popular that in 1823 the owner gave up the dye business altogether and reorganized the company as a special remittance firm, Rishengchang Piaohao. In the next thirty years, eleven piaohao were established in Shanxi province, including Pingyao and the neighboring counties of Qi County, Taigu, and Yuci. By the end of the nineteenth century, thirty-two piaohao with 475 branches were in business covering most of China, and the central Shanxi region became the de facto financial centre of Qing China. The Chinese banking institutions of draft banks or piaohao were also known as Shanxi banks because they were owned primarily by Shanxi merchants.

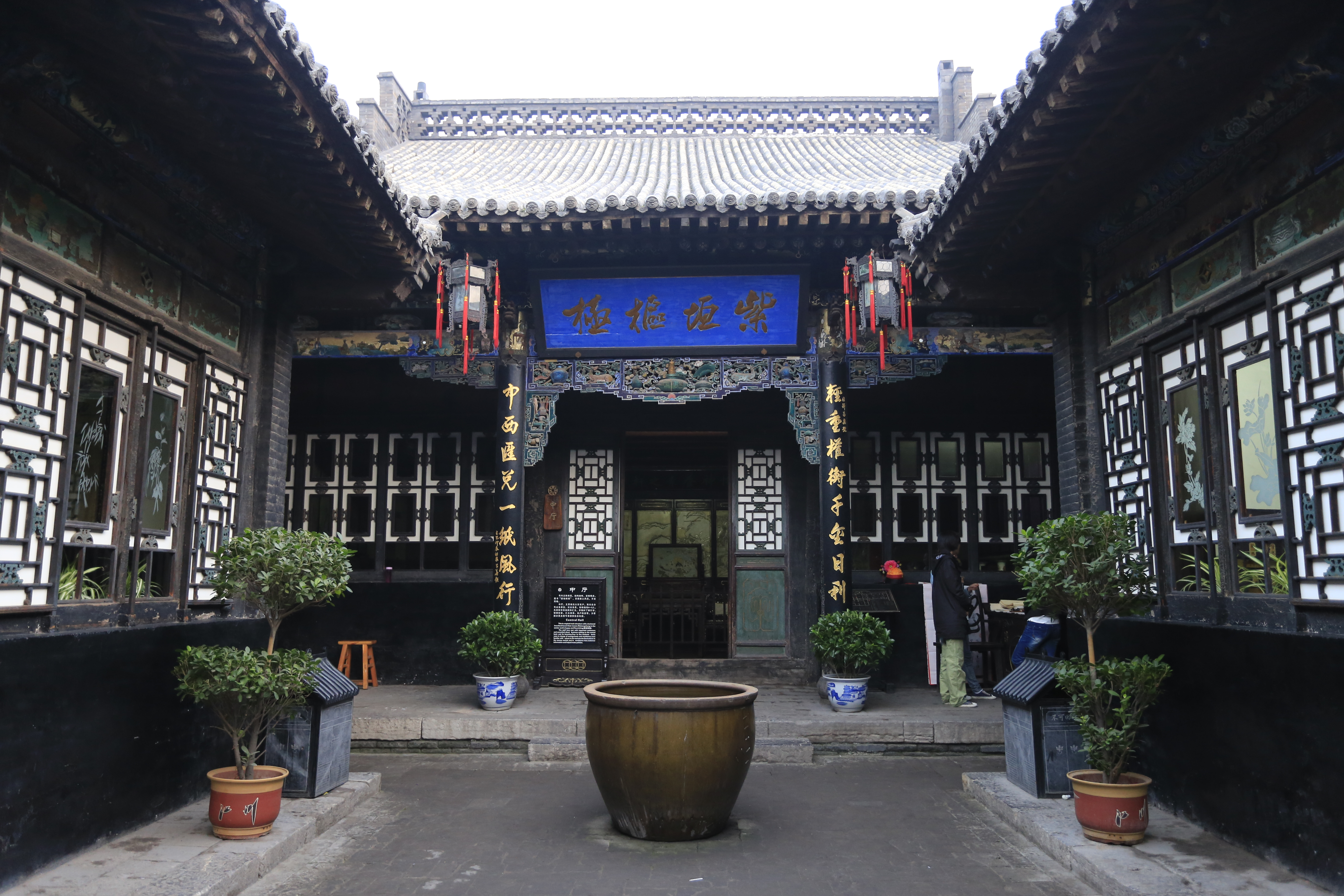
One courtyard in Rishengchang

All piaohao were organised as single proprietaries or partnerships, where the owners carried unlimited liability. They concentrated on interprovincial remittances and later on, conducting government services. From the time of the Taiping Rebellion, when transportation routes between the capital and the provinces were cut off, piaohao began involvement with the delivery of government tax revenue. Piaohao grew by taking on a role in advancing funds and arranging foreign loans for provincial governments, issuing notes, and running regional treasuries.

Lei Lutai (雷履泰), the first chief manager (dazhanggui 大掌櫃, lit. "grand head of the counter") of the Rishengchang, died at his desk in 1849. Though his son was an employee at the bank, Lei had named another employee, Cheng Qingpan (程清泮), to be his successor.

Cheng Qingpan and two subsequent chief manager loaned prudently, and the Rishengchang prospered greatly under their management. In 1880, the capital shareholders of the bank, at the request of Li, had created a wholly new class of non‐voting capital shares, which were named fugu ('attached shares'), for managers. These shares would let the managers of the bank reinvest their dividends back into the Rishengchang without gaining votes in the decision-making process.

Following the death of Li Zhenshi in 1891, his nephew and adopted son, Li Wudian, interested all of Zhenshi's capital shares. Under the ownership of Li Wudian, the Rishengchang would continue to be led by very competent chief manager. Unlike Li Zhenshi, Li Wudian hoped to influence the lending policies of the Rishengchang.

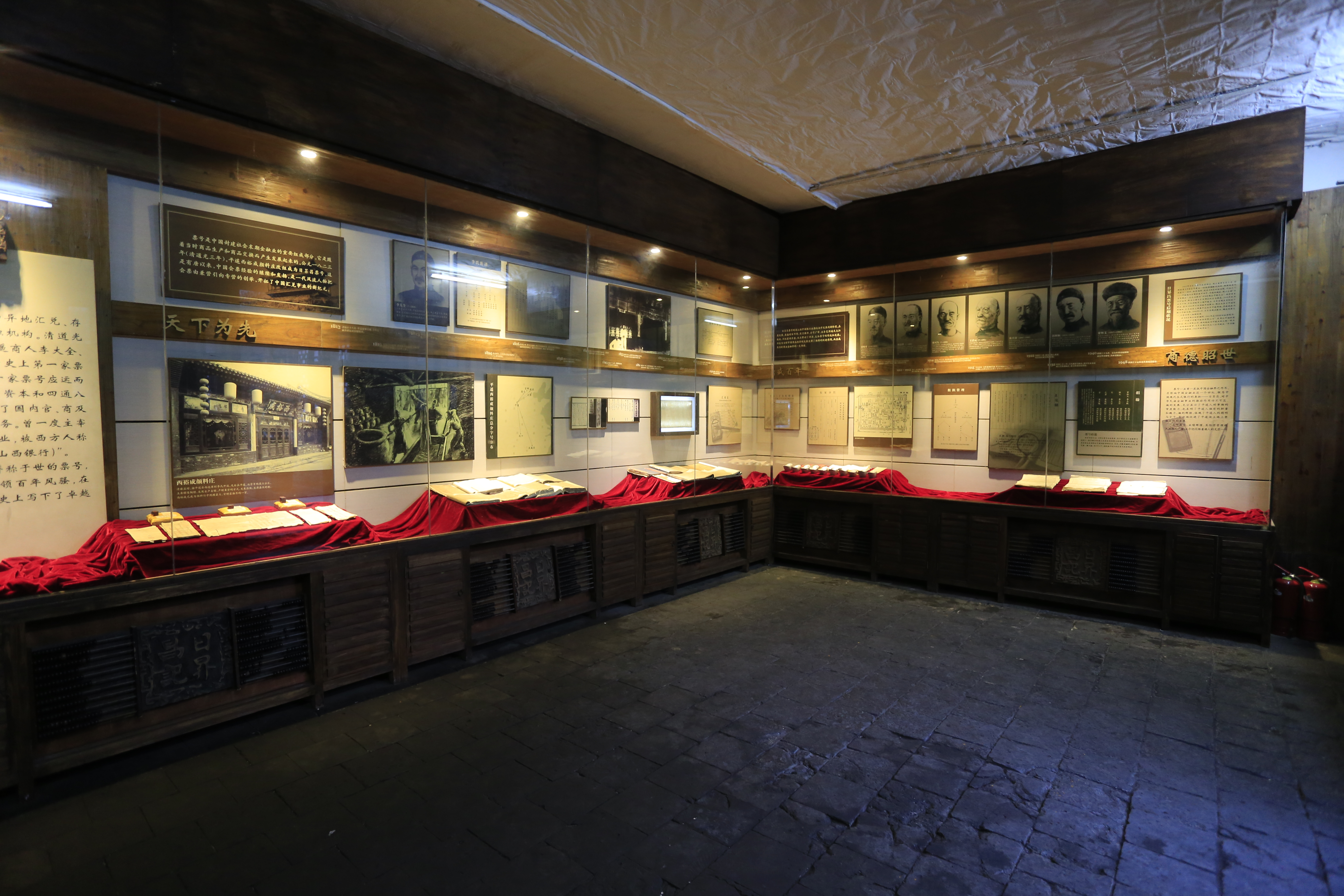
A modern museum of draft banks inside the rooms of Rishengchang

During the grand assessment day of 1910 (Xuantong 2), Li Wudian had created another class of shares known as the konggu (literally translated as 'empty shares') and awarded himself 1.7 of these. The new konggu had full voting rights during grand assessment days and unlike the capital shares, did not require any investments in silver. By creating these new voting shares, Li Wudian had made himself the absolute leader of the Rishengchang and could outvote all the other shareholders.

Using his newly created konggu, Li Wudian was able to vote himself into the position of vice-president of the Rishengchang and gave himself one expertise share; this move gave him a position equal to that of chief manager and during the expertise shareholder meetings he had equal voting rights. Li Wudian was both the top insider as well as the controlling shareholder of the Rishengchang. None of the other managers of the Rishengchang had the courage to go against and criticise Li Wudian's lending-related decisions, as he could fire anyone. Furthermore, he controlled their expertise share allotment as well as the retirement benefits that they would receive. When the chief manager of the Rishengchang dared oppose the decisions that Li had made, contradictory orders would only add to the general confusion that plagued the bank under his reign.

In 1911 and 1912, the performance of the Rishengchang would greatly deteriorate, causing the bank to operate at a net loss. The diminishing returns caused the brothers of Li Wudian to exchange their capital shares in silver. This made the management desperate and Li Wudian had to find new sources to borrow capital from.

In 1914, the branch manager of the Beijing branch office of the Rishengchang was unable to make good on his guarantee of a debt of the failed Heshengyuan Bank. In response he fled back to the province of Shanxi. Later, a warrant was issued for the arrest of the capital shareholders of the Rishengchang as they were held responsible for the act, as the capital shareholders still carried unlimited liability for the actions of the bank. In 1915, under the new Chinese Republican civil code, the creditors that were owed the money would become the new common shareholders of the Rishengchang and they subsequently withdrew the charges that were held against the Li brothers. The new owners of the bank granted the Li brothers an annual salary of 1000 silver dollars.

The reorganised Rishengchang, which only had a single equity class, would continue to operate until 1932, when the bank was forced to permanently close its doors at the height of the global economic Great Depression.

== Rishengchang Code Rule ==
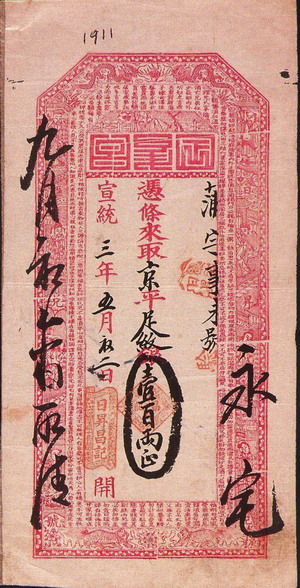
A Qing dynasty banknote of 100 taels of silver issued by the Beijing branch of the Rishengchang Piaohao in the year Xuantong 3 (1911).

In 1824, Rishengchang set up a branch in Taiyuan. The main business was cheques or drafts, which were called tickets in Chinese. At that time, Taiyuan was the base camp of Shanxi businessmen's distribution and maintenance of goods. In order to work efficiently, Rishengchang introduced the world's most advanced printing technology at that time—the watermark method. Rishengchang used this method to produce and print the tickets. Additionally, each ticket was stamped with a seal in the key parts. Of course, the amounts and recipients of the tickets were strictly controlled.

When the Shanxi traders went to other provinces and the frontier border transaction station, they always brought the drafts written by the professional official in Taiyuan Rishengchang using an ink brush. The handwriting had to be simultaneously bulletined and sent to the other 51 branches of Rishengchang. Specifically, the drafts were executed with codes, using Chinese writing to replace numbers and regularly changing the password method to prevent disclosure of confidential information.

== Management ==
=== Management structure ===
Rishengchang operated under a system of separation between ownership and management. The investor provided capital and appointed the general manager but did not involve himself in daily operations. The chief manager held full authority over the piaohao's business, assisted by deputy managers and branch managers throughout the country. To prevent nepotism, Shanxi piaohao generally observed the "Three Lords Exclusion" rule, which barred the investor's brothers-in-law, sons-in-law, and sons from holding positions within the firm.

Succession of chief managers was typically determined by recommendation from the outgoing manager, subject to approval by the investor. All managers rose from apprenticeship, advancing through years of training and evaluation. This system ensured professional competence and continuity in leadership.

=== Dazhanggui ===
The dazhanggui (chief manager) was the highest-ranking executive of the piaohao, holding full authority over business operations, personnel, and coordination of branch offices, a role comparable to a modern chief executive officer.

| No. | Name |
|---|---|
| 1 | Lei Lütai (雷履泰) |
| 2 | Cheng Qingpan (程清泮) |
| 3 | Hao Kejiu (郝可久) |
| 4 | Wang Qiyuan (王启元) |
| 5 | Zhang Xingbang (张兴邦) |
| 6 | Guo Shubing (郭树柄) |
| 7 | Liang Huaiwen (梁怀文) |

== See also ==
- Shanxi merchants
