= Piaohao =

Historical Chinese banking model

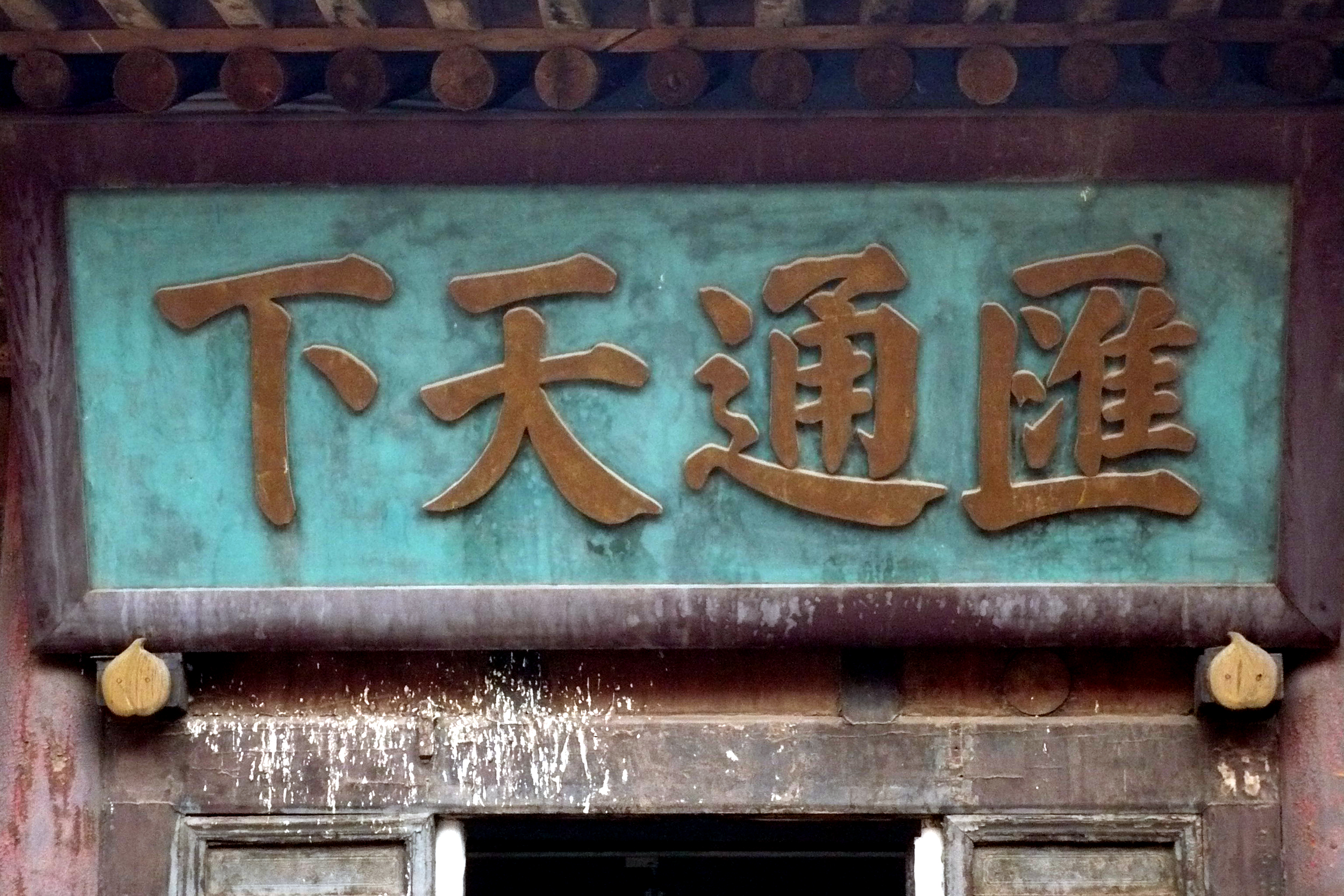
Royal inscribed board, saying Huitong Tianxia (匯通天下, "Financial exchange all over the world"), in Rishengchang, Pingyao.

Piaohao (Traditional Chinese: 票號, literally 'draft banks'), also known as piaozhuang (票莊), huihao (匯號), or huiduizhuang (匯兌莊), in Mandarin Chinese, or Shanxi banks (山西票號) or Shansi banks in English, were a type of bank that existed in China during the Qing dynasty until approximately 1952.

The piaohao were started by merchants from the province of Shanxi who were often originally engaged in other businesses before they entered finance. The piaohao were mostly active in northern China while the qianzhuang were mostly active in the south. The piaohao continued to be the dominant financial institutions of China until 1900 when more modern commercial banks started being created by both the imperial and provincial governments, and the qianzhuang benefitted more from their close ties with foreign banks operating in Chinese treaty ports. During their heyday the piaohao had over 400 branches operating across the territory of the Qing dynasty and branches in other countries like Japan, Korea, Russia, India, and Singapore.

After 1912 practically all piaohao either closed or were transformed into more modern types of banks. They continued to exist during both the early Republic of China and the People's Republic of China until they were all finally nationalized alongside the qianzhuang and the rest of the Chinese financial industry in 1952.

== Structure and business strategies ==
All piaohao were organized as single proprietaries or partnerships, where the owners carried unlimited liability. They concentrated on interprovincial remittances, and later on conducting government services. From the time of the Taiping Rebellion, when transportation routes between the capital and the provinces were cut off, piaohao began involvement with the delivery of government tax revenue. Piaohao grew by taking on a role in advancing funds and arranging foreign loans for provincial governments, issuing notes, and running regional treasuries. The business model of the piaohao gave very little protection to the capital of the shareholders; furthermore, the piaohao imposed a highly centralized management structure, and a tenure- and performance-based incentive structure which was used to discipline distant employees in faraway branches.

The history of the dominant houses in the Shanxi banking shows that it was merchant families who originally began engaging in the monetary business, and they did this often without giving up their original trade. The Shanxi merchants conducted trade in Chinese tea and would travel north through Siberia to cities like Moscow and St. Petersburg; it is suspected that the Shanxi merchants had observed how Western banking works there and attempted to emulate it, but the piaohao remained quite unique.

Most piaohao were founded based on a joint investment, or hehuo (合伙). Only a small number of piaohao only had a single investor.

The shares held by managers carried non-binding votes that were cast exclusively in management meetings; meanwhile, the shares of the shareholders (or owners) carried votes which were cast only on Grand Assessment Days. These days were generally held after each fiscal cycle (typically three or four years) and allowed the shareholders to fire or retain managers and reallocate their shares.

The shares that were inherited through death or retirement were made into a special non-voting class of shares with an expiration date that were only paid out divided. This was done to motivate long-term thinking and to keep the heirs of shareholders outside of the decision‐making process.

A major difference between the piaohao and the qianzhuang was that the qianzhuang banking companies grew out of the money-changing businesses known as the qianpu and would engage in business typical of banks such as providing loans, savings accounts with interest, and so forth, while the piaohao would primarily facilitate the sending of remittances, that is, the sending of money, across the Chinese realm.

Furthermore, qianzhuang tended to be very locally run operations and were typically run only by a single family, or a close set of associates. In contrast, the piaohao maintained branch offices across China. This allowed money to be paid into one branch office and withdrawn from another branch office—essentially sent—without having to arduously transport actual physical silver sycees or strings of copper-alloy cash coins under heavy guard across great distances, bringing many risks.

The height of the capital stock of the piaohao ranged from about 20,000 to as much as 500,000 taels of silver, yet because most of the piaohao reserved an amount of capital protected, known as huben (護本) or beiben (倍本), the operative capital of the banks was much less. The bank reserves were kept in the head office, known as the zonghao (總號). This was also the place where the household of the bank owner was registered. The piaohao tended to have branches, fenhao (分號), in every large Chinese city. This made the remittance of money easily possible between the head office and all of its branch offices. The piaohao had branches throughout China, but the core area of operation was northern China.

Every three or four years, an account known as the jiezhang (結賬) was provided to the shareholders of the piaohao, and dividends were then distributed among them. The most common form of shares was money (銀股), but some shareholders would guarantee their shares with their office and their expected salary in a system that was known as a person-based share; in Mandarin Chinese this was called rengu (人股) or dingshengu (頂身股).

The piaohao operated in daily business, mainly with monetary remittances. The remittance fee, known as huifei (匯費) or huishui (匯水), depended on the distance of the transaction, the urgency, and the quality of the silver that was paid to the remitting bank. The remittance fee that was to be paid by the remitter was known as liqian (力錢). It was either 2 taels (雙力) per 100 taels of silver that was being remitted, or only 1 tael (單力). Local differences in the value of silver ingots could be used by the piaohao for profits by arbitrage businesses; this was known as yaping case (壓平擦色). Another important part of the piaohao business model was the assaying of silver and the production of silver ingots (紋銀); these silver ingots are commonly known in English as sycees.

Because the piaohao shareholders shared unlimited liabilities, when these changing market forces materialized, many of the shareholders of the piaohao went bankrupt, while some shareholders would turn to investments elsewhere and abandoned the piaohao model altogether.

The piaohao had a system of shares known as dual class shares. These let the owners vote only on insiders' retention and compensation every three or four years. The shares of the insiders had the dividend plus votes in meetings advising the general manager of the piaohao on their work such as lending or other business decisions, and were swapped upon the death or retirement of the holder for a ⅓ inheritable non-voting equity class, dead shares, with a fixed expiry date.

These shares were augmented by contracts that would allow the enslavement of insiders' wives and their children, as well as their relative's servants as hostages. These governance mechanisms prevented insider fraud and propelled the piaohao to gain an empire-wide dominance over the Chinese financial sector. Due to this system, the piaohao remained fraud-free during their entire existence.

An assortment of rules prevented abuses of power by branch insiders such as self-dealing, having side interests which could become a conflict of interest, or even engaging in any other business interests. Neither were insiders allowed to lend their savings to anyone. Branch employees were also not granted any leave with the notable exception being the funerals of their parents; furthermore, branch employees were forbidden from taking their family members with them or marrying while on duty. Severe restrictions were also placed on communication as branch employees were only allowed to write a single letter home each month, but the letter was to be reviewed by the head office of the piaohao in Shanxi before it was forwarded to the family of the branch employee.

During the height of the piaohao, 1880 to 1900, their paid out dividends averaged 12,000 taels (or 18,000 Spanish dollars) per fiscal cycle. These dividends were huge fortunes for China at the time—comparatively, a county administrator, or zhixian, would earn an annual salary of 45 taels of silver (or $67.50 in Spanish dollars). During this time, the province of Shanxi's best and brightest men were well-advised to forsake the Confucian civil service for careers in the banking sector because of this.

Unlike shares, securities did not expire: they passed to the owners' heirs and paid interest rather than dividends. These policies may well have sharpened incentives to help the banks succeed, but they also showed that the voting rules employed by the piaohao could change over time.

== History ==
=== Early history ===
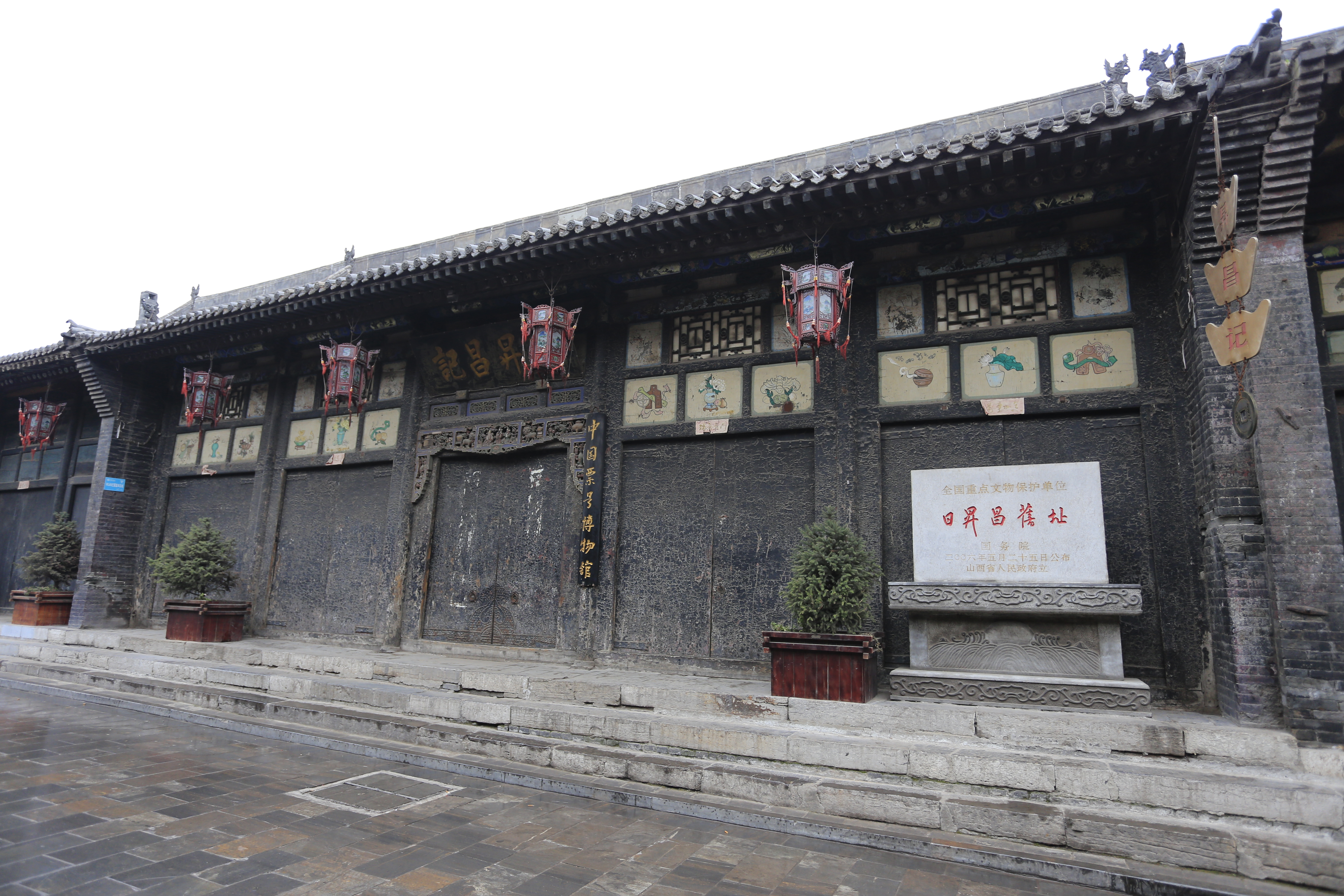
Rishengchang, the first draft bank in China.

The piaohao were an early Chinese banking institution were known as Shanxi banks by foreigners because they were owned primarily by Shanxi merchants. The exact origins of the piaohao remain unclear, and money-order services or remittance banks may or may not have existed in one form or another, at least in some regions of China, as early as the Ming dynasty period. The piaohao were, despite China's long economic history, the first institutions to offer a full range of banking services. Shanxi became a banking centre during this era. The arising of a banking centre in a remote northern inland Chinese province is akin to the United States' financial centre being in remote Fargo, North Dakota, rather than in Manhattan.

The first documented piaohao, Rishengchang, originated from Xiyuecheng Dye Company Pingyao in central Shanxi. The Rishengchang was founded in 1823 by Li Daquan, the owner of the Xiyucheng, a dyed goods company that would purchase raw materials in the province of Sichuan and ran stores in the cities of Beijing, Shenyang, Tianjin, and others. Lei Lvtai, also from Pingyao, observed expensive shipments of silver often would pass each other, going in opposite directions for vast distances; this inspired Lei to see a business opportunity. Lei suggested to his boss, Li Daquan, around the year 1823 that this presented an opportunity to replace expensive private security, wagons, and pack animals with a clearing house for the interregional transfer of money, the settlement of accounts, deposit accounts, loans, and currency exchange services.

The Rishengchang was capitalized with 300,000 taels of silver (or about 450,000 dollars) by Li Daquan. It is possible that Lei Lutai had added 20,000 taels of silver. Lei was the first general manager of the Rishengchang, with Mao Hongsui and Cheng Dapei as the bank's assistant managers. After a few years Mao Hongsui ran into some disagreements with Lei Lutai over business strategy and within a couple of years Mao had organised five more banks. In turn, the managers of these banks also started leaving and creating their own banks.

From 1823 to the early 1840s, the piaohao would experience rapid growth by providing bank drafts as a service for traveling Chinese merchants. These bank drafts could be obtained if a merchant deposited money in cash at a local branch office. The draft was then ripped in half and one half was given to the seller as an IOU and the other to the branch of the bank of the seller. After the buyer confirmed the receipt of the goods, the seller could then claim the missing half of the bank draft that was issued to join at his branch office and effect the transfer of monetary funds into his account there.

To deal with the transfer of large amounts of cash from one branch to another, the company introduced drafts, cashable in the company's many branches around China. Although this new method was originally designed for business transactions within the Xiyuecheng Company, it became so popular that in 1823 the owner gave up the dye business altogether and reorganized the company as a special remittance firm, Rishengchang Piaohao. In the next thirty years, eleven piaohao were established in Shanxi province, including Pingyao and the neighboring counties of Qi County, Taigu, and Yuci. By the end of the nineteenth century, thirty-two piaohao with 475 branches were in business covering most of China, and the central Shanxi region became the de facto financial centre of Qing China.

During stable times the piaohao were based on Confucianist hierarchical structures and imperial edicts. Usually disputes were not brought to any formal courts and the act of taking someone to court was not only ineffective but was considered shameful in traditional Chinese culture. The insider laws of the piaohao were based on Confucian traditions and the laws themselves can be described as "a game of ritual formalism". Because the descendants of merchants (a class which includes bankers) were not allowed to take any civil service examinations for three generations, the majority of the Chinese magistrates came from other classes of the four occupations, mostly from the land-owning classes. Because the merchant class could not rely on the magistrates for fair justice, they had to create their own system of enforcing contracts—this system included a general manager chosen by the shareholders. These general managers usually had a team of vice presidents that were tasked to supervise the clerks and other bank employees.

During their early years, the piaohao would pay depositors interests of 0.2% to 0.3% per month and lend out money at an interest rate of 0.6% to 0.7% per month. The biggest clients of the piaohao were merchants and various wealthy individuals, especially the nobility with whom the piaohao had connections. The piaohao would also record loans made from one party to another.

The society of the Qing dynasty was one where the general population tended to have a mistrust of outsiders. Usually, people only trusted their direct family members or people with whom they had established longstanding ties. In this society large business enterprises that were run by professionals were largely disfavored. Despite these societal factors, Chinese merchant guilds, which were monopolistic in nature, had found a way to circumvent these issues by vouching for traveling merchants who were paying members. Some Chinese merchant guilds would accept members from many regions of China. The Shanxi Dyed Goods Guild, of which the Rishengchang was a member, was restricted to families that originated in Pingyao county, Shanxi; these types of restrictions would also later be adopted by other piaohao for their hiring practices. Many piaohao would only hire people from the province of Shanxi while other piaohao would completely restrict their hiring to only a single county. For their hiring practices, the piaohao would check an applicant's family background for three generations—this was because families rarely moved to distant places in China and old neighbors intimately knew each other's families as well as each other's family histories. The background check and guarantor from the applicant's native county ensured both the loyalty and total honesty of the employees that were hired by the piaohao, but this system also protected them. If a dispute arose between the employee and the piaohao, the guarantor undertook negotiations with the piaohao to make sure that the manager was not impugned unjustly.

The decision to completely limit the fulfillment of staff to only people from the same region or whose ancestral roots lay in the same region proved to be a rather powerful governance mechanism. The dividend paid out to the managers was allocated to their blood relatives back in the Shanxi province, which meant that the social and economic status of their families depended on their performance, and any malfeasance from these managers would endanger not just their families' economic and social status back home, but also their freedom and lives. A potential employee with a clean background would present a personal guarantee letter from an eminent personage in his native county for the bank.

=== Rise of the piaohao ===
From the 17th century onwards, China experienced a growing business of interregional trade which required a more elaborate system of credit, exchange, and remittance than that which was already in place. This demand was behind the early success of the piaohao as interregional banks. Paramount to this development were local banks in the districts of Pingyao, Qixian, and Taigu, all in the province of Shanxi. Because the credit business was overwhelmingly controlled by the merchant banks from the province of Shanxi, they were also commonly known as Shanxi piaohao (山西票號), which is how they came to be known as the Shansi Banks to foreigners. Shanxi merchants were so intertwined with the financial business that they received nicknames like kedui (克兌, 'changers') or keqian (克錢, 'moneylenders'). The piaohao helped promote interregional trade in China.

The most important of the three banking groups or sanbang (三幫) in Shanxi were the Pingyao-based Rishengchang Bank (日升昌票莊), the Pingyao-based Five United Weizi Banks (蔚字五聯號), the Qixian-based Heshengyuan Bank (合盛元號), a bank based on the Chinese tea trade, or the Taigu-based Zhichengxin Bank (志誠信號), who were former silk traders.

The members of the Pingyao-based Five United Weizi Banks include:

- Weitaihou (蔚泰厚);
- Weifenghou (蔚豐厚);
- Weishengzhang (蔚盛長);
- Xintaihou (新泰厚), and
- Tianchengheng (天成亨), a company that was formerly operating in the silk business before it became a bank.

The piaohao acquired a vast network of customers throughout China by establishing a widespread network of branch offices to provide their services in more places; furthermore, the piaohao were responsible for inventing various types of draft and creating more pricing remittance fees based on a diverse range of factors.

The piaohao would oftentimes only hire people from the province of Shanxi, or only from a single county; for example, the Rishengchang only hired people from Pinyao. This was because in traditional culture outsiders were frowned upon and many people often only preferred to deal with only direct family or people from the same area as them.

During the heyday of the piaohao there were a total of 32 independent banks in operation, with over 400 branch offices spread throughout China. Some piaohao also had branch offices abroad in the Japanese cities of Tokyo, Kobe, and Yokohama, the cities of Incheon, Korea; Moscow, Russia; Calcutta, British India; or the British colony of Singapore.

The Beijing branch of the Rishengchang had a large plate (竖匾) above its main entrance with the text Huitong Tianxia (匯通天下, 'Financial exchange all over the world'), for many years.

In Qing China both the feudal nobility and the government bureaucrats were de facto above the law. These classes had the ability to confiscate the wealth of the general population, including Chinese merchants, with impunity. Furthermore, because the nobles and government bureaucrats could manipulate the Chinese legal system to their favor, there were no chances for the wronged parties to redress these confiscations. As the piaohao grew to become more prominent in the Chinese financial market, they presented a more attractive target for such predation by those in power. Consequently, the piaohao, like other Shanxi merchants, sought to ingratiate themselves with important government officials to avoid such a fate. In order to gain more favorable relationships with the government of the Qing dynasty, the piaohao would directly finance its expenditures. The piaohao also handled "donations" given to the Qing dynasty that bought honorary titles. They also invested in future mandarins by lending them funds for their travels to the capital city of Beijing, where they took the Confucian civil service examinations.

The Beijing branches of many piaohao would heavily entertain Chinese government officials and feudal nobles. This policy would provide returns in several ways to the piaohao, as it not only attracted deposits of wealth from courted Chinese government officials and feudal nobles, but also entire budgets of ministries. The ministries often paid no interest in order for the piaohao to stay in the government's good graces.

=== Role of the piaohao during the First Opium War ===
While the 19th century was a disastrous time period for the Qing dynasty, the piaohao managed to turn each and every disaster that China faced into a profitable and lucrative business opportunity. The Treaty of Nanking stipulated that the government of the Qing dynasty had to pay the United Kingdom a sum of 21,000,000 Spanish dollars in war indemnities. To raise this amount of money, the government of the Qing dynasty issued an order to each Chinese provincial government to transfer a levy of silver to British agents stationed in the assigned treaty ports and enclaves. However, this proved to be a predicament for inland provincial governments as they were unable to transport huge amounts of silver securely from the Chinese interior to the faraway treaty ports. General manager of the Rishengchang, Lei Lutai, saw an opportunity in this crisis. Lei instructed branch managers of the Rishengchang that were situated in the inland provinces of China to offer their Chinese provincial governments bank drafts to transfer the silver to the designated treaty port cities before the deadline with the British was met.

In preparation for this move, Lei had ordered the move of large amounts of silver to the port branch offices of the Rishengchang, so that when the provincial government representatives arrived, sufficient quantities of silver would await them there. This plan had proved to work flawlessly for both the Chinese provincial governments and the Rishengchang and they averted an impending disaster.

=== During the Taiping Rebellion ===
The most important customers of the piaohao were the Chinese merchants who conducted interregional trade, known as bangji maoyi (埠際貿易). This changed following the large Taiping Rebellion which affected Chinese society and its government immensely. The piaohao began to be trusted by the government to take over various tasks. These included the remittance of funds known as huijie (匯解) to other Chinese provinces, in a process known as xiekuan (協款) or xiexiang (協餉); providing services such as the advanced payment for imperial troops, known as xiangyin (餉銀) or junxiang (軍餉); or providing funds for the infrastructure of the local Chinese governments. These funds were known as the xinjin (薪金).

The Taiping Rebellion had a major impact on the ability of the government of the Qing dynasty to collect taxes. The loss of many of its southern provinces to rebel forces deprived the Qing of millions of taxpayers and it also cut Beijing off from the remaining provinces and their resources in Southwest China.

In order to help transfer funds and government revenues through rebel territory, the government of the Qing dynasty sought the help of the piaohao; the piaohao again used bank drafts for these monetary transfers. Thereafter, the military budget (junxiang), poll tax (dingliang), sales tax (lijin), and provincial indemnity levies (gesheng ding'e tanpai waizhai) all moved about the territory held by the Qing through interest‐free accounts at the piaohao, which lent at seven li to eight li.

The piaohao also received many other beneficial business deals from the Chinese government during the Taiping Rebellion. The piaohao offered the deposit of funds, which were known as cunkuan (存款), and credits, which were known as fangkuan (放款), to the local government, which were then called the guankuan (官款), state officials, or private persons. The reputation of the piaohao during this era was very high and they greatly profited from this reputation. A huge number of people deposited their money and savings. This was done in spite of the low interest rates given by the piaohao; these low percentages were in contrast to the very high interest rates that they placed on credits.

Credits were also given to smaller banks in southeast China that were known as the qianzhuang, pawnshops that were known as diandang (典當), and the great merchant houses of China. Finally the piaohao took over the office selling business—the purchase, or juan guan (捐官), of Qing dynasty brevet titles (銜), or they advanced money for the purchase of a vacancy, known as mou que (謀缺).

At the height of the Taiping Rebellion, the business of transacting funds and revenue became even more dangerous for the Chinese government. In order to overcome these new difficulties, the existing piaohao were greatly expanded to accommodate this demand. The principal function of the piaohao under normal circumstances was to send currency to more distant places in payment for traded goods and services. For this service the remittance banks charged a fee, which ranged from 2% to 6%. During the usual course of business, these banks also held Qing Chinese government funds for disbursement. As the piaohao were strongly represented in the north of China, the Chinese government saw it as only natural that these banks would be chosen to disburse the Hubu Guanpiao tael notes through their services. The piaohao were often active in the assigned treaty ports cultivating the business of both Chinese merchants and foreigner traders alike. The piaohao tended to be very competitive by nature and cooperated extensively with other branches of banking corporations within their own sphere. They would often send crucial banking-related news to member banks by carrier pigeon. Prior to the introduction of the railroad to China, the Chinese economy relied heavily on piaohao to finance inter-city commerce. In Northern China the preferred method of land transportation was the camel due to the fact that these animals could cope with the conditions while many other animals could not. The piaohao employed camels in the north for transportation. The piaohao and other Chinese banking companies were essential in connecting the various monetary systems that circulated in China at the time by facilitating interregional trade and commerce, providing credit for merchants, and cooperating in times of crisis. It was customary for example for the Shanghai banks to make advances to junk owners who were engaged in the trade of carrying tribute rice to the north, holding their vessels as collateral. These junks, after having unloaded their rice in the port, would return with shipments of oil, peas, bean cakes, and other products for trade.

The piaohao benefitted greatly from the "great contribution campaign", or the dajuan (大捐). The campaign was instigated by the government of the Qing dynasty to cover their military expenses to continue fighting the Taiping Heavenly Kingdom. During the campaign the Chinese government managed to advance 2,600,000 taels of silver for the purchasing of offices.

=== Role of the piaohao during the Second Opium War ===
Following the foreign victory during the Second Opium War, the Qing retaliated by torturing and killing British envoys; this act added an additional 8,000,000 taels of silver to the war debt of the Qing dynasty to the Western powers. The Qing was forced to legalise both Christianity and opium as well as opening more of its ports to foreign traders where extraterritorial rights were granted to foreign enclaves. The piaohao were once again tasked with the transfer of funds via bank drafts by the inland provincial governments.

=== Modernisation of China and the role of the piaohao ===
By the 19th century, the piaohao had become quite well-established and widespread, handling as much as half of all banking activity in the Qing Empire; this would last until the establishment of an official modern postal service in the 1890s, which took over the role of the piaohao as a remittance service.

The piaohao were crucial players in the modernization of China during the end of the 19th century. The piaohao gave credit for investing in industrialization and infrastructure, such as the construction of factories and railways across China. In fact, Ulrich Theobald from the website Chinaknowledge.de argues that many of these improvements would not have been possible without financial aid from the piaohao.

The Shanghai piaohao offered the subscription, or rengou (認購), of bonds like the Zhaoxin share from the year 1898, which was also known as the Zhaoxin gupiao (昭信股票), or the bonds issued to finance the Boxer Indemnity, which were known as the gengzi beikuan (庚子賠款). They also issued shares themselves which did, as that of the Dadetong Bank (大德通票號), which yielded enormous profits for the banks. The shares were valued at 850 taels of silver in the year 1889; later their shares stood at 3,150 taels of silver in 1896, 4,024 taels in silver in 1990, and at 17,000 taels of silver in 1908.

During the latter half of the 19th century, a group of southern Chinese banks known as the nanbang piaohao (南幫票號), which were usually called yinhao (銀號), was created by local traders and merchants in the southern province of Zhejiang. These were, for instance, the Yuanfengrun Bank (源豐潤票號) or the Yishanyuan Bank (義善源票號).

The piaohao would find that China's social and business environment became more unpredictable as it was expanding. This coincided with the managers of the piaohao reaching the zenith of their competence; the highly centralized structure of the piaohao organizations would begin to show lower returns on investment. These high financial leverages paired with a narrowed profit margin would also indicate the hidden risks that the piaohao faced. During this time period the qianzhuang banks became more important in the Chinese financial sector, as they had close connections to the foreign banking companies that began investing in China, particularly in the treaty port city of Shanghai. Despite the rise of the qianzhuang, the financial power of the piaohao would still allow them a superior position during this era, as many of the smaller qianzhuang would often borrow money from them.

In 1875, 24 piaohao founded the common office, the Shanghai Banking Association, or the Shanghai huiye gongsuo (上海匯業公所). The piaohao were, furthermore, backed by the government of the Qing dynasty, the officialdom, wealthy merchants and merchant families, and the landowner class. Contact between the piaohao and foreign banks or foreign merchants at this time was rather indirect, and passed only through the mediation of the local qianzhuang.

During the Boxer Rebellion, the piaohao directly financed the Qing court as it fled from Beijing to Xi'an in 1900 following the occupation of the former by foreign powers.

Around 1900 the heyday of the piaohao was over, even if they still had operating capital of more than 200 million taels of silver. The qianzhuang had gradually taken over the fields of business where the piaohao also operated. In addition, each province of the Qing dynasty had founded a government bank, known as the guanyin qianhao (官銀錢號); the central government of the Qing dynasty, too, had created national banks such as the Commercial Bank of China, the Bank of Communications, and the Da-Qing Bank.

During the Xinhai Revolution it became very common for the branch offices of the piaohao to be subject to looting which caused immense financial losses; furthermore, the chaos caused many bad loans to not be repaid and many people started withdrawing their deposits. During this era Chinese commercial banks and foreign banks started to poach the staff of the piaohao when they started to penetrate the Chinese remittance market.

=== After the Xinhai Revolution ===
After 1912 practically all piaohao closed or were transformed into more modern types of commercial banks.

Following the Xinhai Revolution rule of law collapsed, causing many provinces to declare their secession from the new republic, making China merely into a geographic region rather than a political one. The piaohao were forced to either liquidate themselves voluntarily or fall into bankruptcy. Various factors were responsible for the ultimate fall of the piaohao following the fall of the Qing dynasty.

Foreign banking and financial companies that were operating in treaty ports and foreign enclaves benefited from relative rule of law and legal innovations of the Western world such as limited liability. Rival commercial Chinese banks gained similar flexibility under a 1901 German Civil Code, and other Chinese commercial banks also took root in foreign enclaves despite the legal discrimination they faced there. Modern technologies like railroads and telegraph lines let all such entrants establish account clearing operations that would rival the clearing houses already established by the piaohao at a lower cost. The rival banks, both foreign and Chinese, could charge less money for loans than the piaohao while paying higher interest rates.

The main income of the piaohao, namely interest‐free deposits to the government of the Qing dynasty and intergovernmental transfers between different departments and provinces, disappeared overnight as there was no longer a Chinese government. The only institutional change brought to the Chinese financial system by the late Qing dynasty, the standardisation of currency, had completely ended the domestic money exchange business in which the piaohao were operating. As more chaos affected China, the piaohaos' borrowers defaulted. They lacked any collateral—their reputation had always been enough to get a loan. The shareholders were completely unprotected due to their unlimited liability. The piaohaos' capital shareholders and managers, due to the indemnification clauses which were present in their employment contracts, had to face the full losses causing many fortunes to be lost in the chaos.

Following the takeover of mainland China by the Chinese Communist Party (CCP) during the Chinese Civil War and the establishment of the People's Republic of China in 1949, the CCP started introducing many Soviet-style reforms. While many of the reforms affecting the ancien régime banks, including the piaohao, superficially resembled the reforms of the Soviet Union, the CCP would adopt a strategy which they dubbed cultural positioning. This model would utilize traditional Chinese cultural influences in the process of implementing radical Socialist changes. During this transitional period the piaohao would maintain their strong traditional identity, but as piaohao were severely influenced by the political changes that affected them, many piaohao adopted a strategy of political compliance for their continued existence. The CCP saw the piaohao in a very antagonistic light; this was for a myriad of reasons strongly related to their Confucian nature. The leaders of the CCP viewed the qianzhuang as part of the hated bourgeoisie and claimed that private banks were anti-progressive, nationalistic, reactionary against the Socialist revolution, and that they were very politically unreliable. The CCP hoped to transform the financial sector of China to serve the proletariat instead of the bourgeoisie. In reality, the political ambiguity of the private Chinese financial sector was likely an obstacle in the eyes of those who wished to transform the Mainland Chinese economy into a state-controlled planned economy. But during the initial phase of the People's Republic of China, the continued existence of the independent private banks was tolerated.

During the year 1950 the private banks of Hankou steadily experienced a recovery. The recovery of the private financial sector was crucial for the economy of Hankou following the devastating hyperinflation that affected mainland China during the aftermath of World War II and the retreat of the Nationalist Chinese government to Taiwan. The financial authority of Wuhan introduced more regulations and policies affecting local private banks, including the only piaohao in the city. The new Wuhan financial authority placed all banks, including qianzhuang, piaohao (Shanxi banks), and commercial banks, into a single category. The local government of Wuhan attempted to negotiate mandatory deposit reserve ratios for banks, valorise credit markets, and release tighter remittance restrictions on all banks to stimulate the ravaged economy.

By the end of 1950 the Wuhan financial authority would place all qianzhuang and the sole remaining piaohao of Wuhan, most of which were located in former Hankou, into three bank unions. The banks were allowed to negotiate which union they would join. Seven qianzhuang would form the first banking union, five Zhe-Bang qianzhuang and one piaohao formed the second banking union, and five qianzhuang formed the third banking union.

== Banknotes issued by piaohao ==
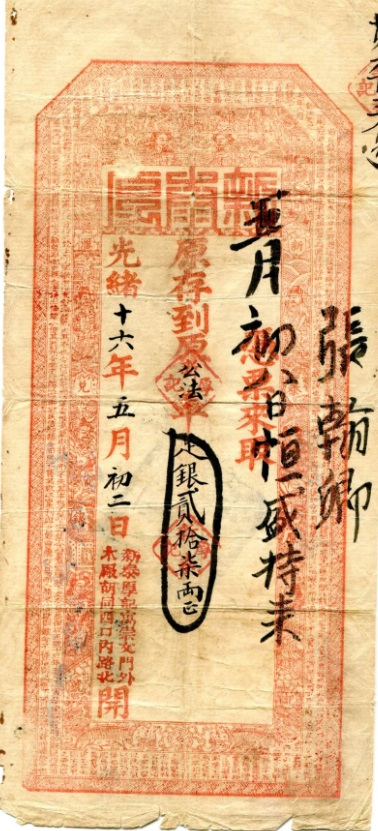
A banknote issued by a piaohao in the year Guangxu 16 (1890).

During the late Ming dynasty period, Chinese people already widely used letters of exchange or money orders known as huipiao (匯票 or 會票) as a means of remittance (匯兌, huìduì or 撥兌, bōduì).

By the 19th century paper money had been long abandoned in China and various types of commodity currencies such as silver sycees denominated in taels had become the standard currency for large transactions. The tael had regionally varying weights dependent on which city it was being traded in; for example, the Guangzhou tael was 37.5 grams of silver, the Shanghai tael was 33.9 grams of silver, and the Customs tael was 37.8 grams of silver. The conversion rates between common tael types were well‐known among Chinese traders and merchants, and local units would take precedence unless a particular weight or purity was specified. The Spanish dollar (or piece of eight), which was a common currency in coastal China, contained 25.56 grams of pure silver; this made one Chinese tael roughly 1.5 Spanish dollars.

The monthly interest rates were usually 2-3 li for deposits and 6-7 li for loans. Monthly interest rates were calculated based on permillage (‰) while annual interest rates were based on percentages (%). There exists the possibility that the papers issued by the piaohao were discounted when traded, but there is no evidence to support this hypothesis.

Some piaohao issued their own paper bills, which were known as duitie (兌帖), qitie (期帖), qiantie (錢帖), and yinpiao (銀票), with different functions (many of these banknotes represented letters of exchange). These banknotes were seen as "making good for the missing of a kind of paper money or paper currency in the monetary system of the (early) Qing dynasty period", as well as for the failed Great Qing Treasure Note and Hubu Guanpiao banknotes issued during the reign of the Xianfeng Emperor.

The piaohao traded in currencies and conducted currency exchange. At the time there were twenty different forms of bulk silver currency circulating in China; each of these currencies had a different weight and percentage of silver purity. The piaohao issued two types of draft bills, one for ordinary customers and the other for longstanding customers. The bills issued for ordinary customers told the branch office to use a specific type of unit without informing the customer, while the bills for longstanding customers explicitly defined which unit was used.

== Differences between qianzhuang and piaohao ==
=== Hankou ===
In an attempt to see why the qianzhuang succeeded in Hankou while the piaohao (or Shanxi banks) failed, Yun Liu attempted to compare them and tried to see why one type of bank slowly disappeared while the other continued to thrive in the same city by comparing information on both of them from the archives of Hankou.

Both the qianzhuang and the piaohao expanded their businesses at the same time. During their history, neither the Hankou qianzhuang nor the Hankou piaohao chose to Westernise their business models and practices, and despite being managed very similarly, the Hankou piaohao would struggle following the fall of the Qing dynasty, while the Hankou qianzhuang would continue to strive.

When modern banks started entering the Hankou scene, both the Hankou qianzhuang and the Hankou piaohao would maintain their small business and staff sizes. According to Yun Liu, some modern scholars claim that the piaohao disappeared because they resisted adopting modern corporate structures and they remained deliberately ignorant of how modern financial businesses operated. This narrative was stated by the manager of a Hankou piaohao in a report to his piaohao's head office in Pingyao, Shanxi, where he insisted on the incorporation of a new bank to be better equipped to compete. His plans included an elaborate scheme of staff duties, how ownership should work, and its corporate bylaws, but this proposal was disregarded by the higher-ups.

Both the Hankou qianzhuang and the Hankou piaohao would continue to claim infinite liability without actualising an incorporated form. In reality this caused their business traditions to resist any adoption of fiscal reforms. Yun Liu also argues that it would be futile to argue that either the qianzhuang or the piaohao system would be more Confucian-featured, thus would either be more privileged or deprived in business because of this style assumingly. Following the Wuchang Uprising which occurred in the city of Wuchang, right next to Hankou, the number of Hankou piaohao decreased in a very short amount of time. During the Qing dynasty in 1881, the city of Hankou counted a total of 33 piaohao, while only 31 years later immediately following the proclamation of the Republic of China in 1912, the piaohao only numbered five. However, in 1923 the number of Hankou piaohao would increase to nine. In 1931 the number of Hankou qianzhuang was at 150 compared to only seven Hankou piaohao. Only two years later, in 1933, the number of active Hankou piaohao had been reduced to two. By 1949, when the People's Republic of China under the Chinese Communist Party was established, only a single piaohao remained in all of Hankou. In his paper, Yun Liu concluded that Hankou piaohao were more prone to (permanent) closure because they were more vulnerable to any changes in the political landscape due to their higher levels of exposure to political risks. While for politicians the qianzhuang would often serve as their liaisons to the locals, this might explain the failure of the Hankou piaohao being plausibly caused by its credit risk hidden in its uncollateralized loans, or a combination of various accidents over the years.

== Jade parachutes and pensions ==
The piaohao had created a rather complicated system for pensions and welfare to help incentivise people to work harder for the shareholders. This pension scheme consisted of three separate funds was either referred to as a gong ji jin (literally 'pension account') or a Caishen Zhang (literally 'God of wealth account').

The first fund was a type of bad state‐of‐the‐world insurance. The capital shareholders and expertise shareholders would negotiate a fraction of earnings that would have to be retained to be placed into this fund. The money saved into this fund was used for the scenario when an "act of God" harmed the bank's earnings during this fiscal year.

The second fund was used to pay interest to the capital shareholders of the piaohao and this fund also contained their deposits; this was because capital shareholders were free to reinvest any fraction of their dividends into the company if they so wished. Drawing this fund down would require the approval of the capital shareholders. The fund provided a capital base for financing the development of the piaohao as well as its expansion.

The third of these funds was used to pay dividends to both dead and retired shareholders as well their heirs. These payments always had fixed terms and were paid until the shares expired. For example, a general manager who formerly had a single expertise share would receive one "dead share" with an expiration date after eight years and a lesser insider with only one expertise share would receive a "dead share" which expired only after seven years. Insiders with fractional expertise shares were granted identical fractions of a "dead share", but these "dead shares" would expire sooner for smaller fractions. For example, "dead shares" comprising an eighth or a ninth of an expertise share were typically terminated after only six years, while those from 0.6 or 0.7 of an expertise share terminated after five years, and so on, getting shorter for smaller fractions.

This system gave retiring managers of a piaohao or one of its branch offices strong incentives to look to the long‐run profitability of the piaohao in general, and to carefully choose and train those who would succeed them, for their incomes in retirement as well as the prosperity of their heirs would be dependent on the performance both the piaohao of their successors. According to some reports, the first general manager of the Rishengchang nominated a candidate other than his own son as the next general manager, as this system disincentivised nepotism in favour of a meritocracy.

== See also ==
- History of banking in China

== Sources ==
- Hong Pu (洪璞) (1998). "Shanxi piaohao (山西票號)", in Tang Jiahong (唐嘉弘), ed. Zhongguo gudai dianzhang zhidu da cidian (中國古代典章制度大辭典) (Zhengzhou: Zhongzhou guji chubanshe), 668. (in Mandarin Chinese).
- Huang Da (黃達), Liu Hongru (劉鴻儒), Zhang Xiao (張肖), ed. (1990). Zhongguo jinrong baike quanshu (中國金融百科全書) (Beijing: Jingji guanli chubanshe), Vol. 1, 227. (in Mandarin Chinese).
- Mo Zongtong (莫宗通) (1997). "Piaohao (票號)", in Men Kui (門巋), Zhang Yanjin (張燕瑾), ed. Zhonghua guocui da cidian (中華國粹大辭典) (Xianggang: Guoji wenhua chuban gongsi), 102. (in Mandarin Chinese).
- Tang Chuansi (唐傳泗) (1992). "Piaohao (票號)", in Zhongguo da baike quanshu (中國大百科全書), Zhongguo lishi (中國歷史) (Beijing / Shanghai: Zhongguo da baike quanshu chubanshe), Vol. 2, 751. (in Mandarin Chinese).
- Yao Enquan (姚恩權) (1993). "Piaohao (票號)", in Shi Quanchang (石泉長), ed. Zhonghua baike yaolan (中華百科要覽) (Shenyang: Liaoning renmin chubanshe), 85. (in Mandarin Chinese).
- Zhang Guohui (張國輝) (1988). "Piaohao (票號)", Zhongguo da baike quanshu (中國大百科全書), Jingjixue (經濟學) (Beijing / Shanghai: Zhongguo da baike quanshu chubanshe), Vol. 2, 712. (in Mandarin Chinese).
- Zhaojin Ji (2003). A History of Modern Shanghai Banking: The Rise and Decline of China's Finance Capitalism (Armonk / London: Sharpe).
