= Shanxi merchants =

Chinese merchant group

Shanxi merchants, also known as Jin merchants (Chinese: 晋商; pinyin: Jìnshāng), were the group of merchants from Shanxi province, China. Jin is an abbreviated name of Shanxi.

Even though the history of noticeable Shanxi merchants can be dated back to as early as the Spring and Autumn period, more than 2000 years ago, Shanxi merchants became prominent during the Ming and Qing dynasties, and their dominant influence in Chinese commerce, within the nation and with neighboring Mongolia, Russia, and Japan, lasted for more than 500 years.

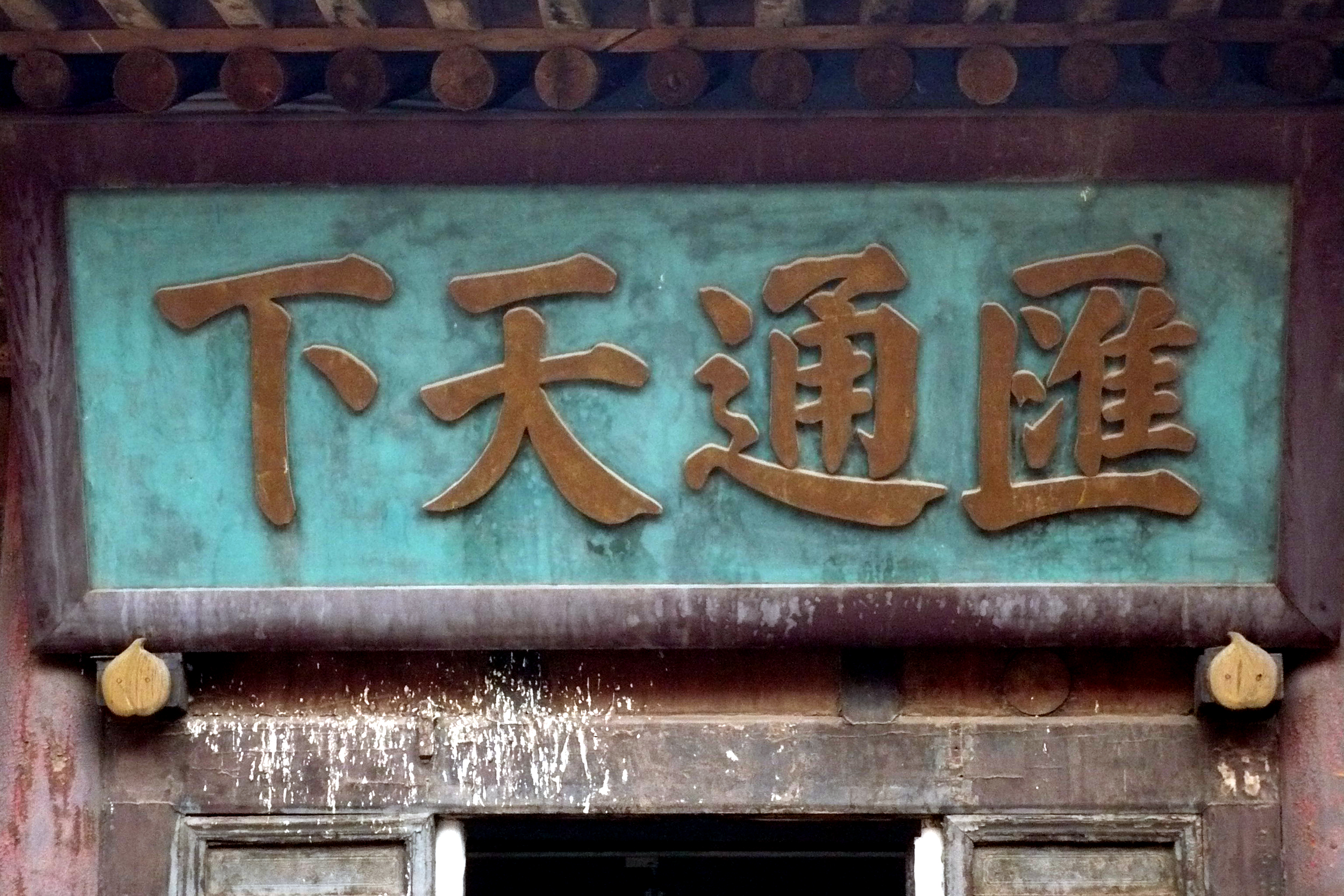
Royal inscribed board, saying "remittances connecting all under heaven", in Rishengchang, Pingyao

The Shanxi merchants pioneered China's first private remittance banking system, piaohao, which came to dominate Chinese finance for nearly a century: at their peak, 26 piaohao operated 485 branches across 95 cities, annually mobilizing an estimated 250 million taels of silver and handling roughly 20% of the Qing government's interprovincial tax transfers, earning Shanxi merchants the titles "the wealthiest within the four seas" (海內最富) and "remittances connecting all under heaven" (匯通天下). Shanxi merchant families accumulated extraordinary wealth: the Cao family of Taigu alone amassed a fortune exceeding 12 million taels at their peak, surpassing the entire cost of building the Beiyang Fleet, the Qing dynasty's modern naval force. Comparable fortunes were held by many merchant families across Shanxi, with Pingyao, Qixian, and Taigu forming the historic heartland of Jin merchant. The piaohao system declined after the 1911 Revolution, when the suspension of government remittances left outstanding loans unrecoverable across the provinces.

== History ==
Shanxi merchants were among the earliest Chinese businessmen and their history could be traced back to the Spring and Autumn period and the Warring States period. Southern Shanxi first came into commercial prominence due to its proximity to the political and cultural centers of ancient China.

However, it was not until the Ming and Qing dynasties, that Shanxi merchants really stood out among other Chinese merchant groups, built a strong and long-lasting commercial network and accumulated enormous wealth.

At the beginning of Ming dynasty, the newly established government was in constant fighting with the remnant of the expelled Mongolian armies, along the northern border. In order to reduce the cost of logistics to transport food and other essential supplies to the military, the Ming government decided to grant salt sales license to those who deliver supplies for the frontier soldiers. The salt trade, as a high margin trade of essential goods, had been historically monopolized by the government to ensure enough tax, and the distribution of salt sales licenses served as one of the main profit sources for the early Shanxi merchants. Shanxi is located in North China close to the Ming-Northern Yuan border, and Yuncheng city in southern Shanxi has a very large natural salt production lake, therefore the geographical proximity was conveniently exploited by these merchants.

In Qing dynasty, merchants from central Shanxi basin, including Yuci, Qixian, Taigu, Pingyao, etc. pioneered the first private financial system, so-called draft banks or Piaohao, throughout and even beyond China. By the end of the nineteenth century, thirty-two piaohao with 475 branches were in business covering most of China, and the central Shanxi region became the de facto financial centres of Qing China.

During the Boxer Rebellion in 1900, the Qing court fled westward to Xi'an. The government ordered provinces to remit the capital levy (jingxiang, 京餉) to Pingyao, Shanxi, and Rishengchang handled the bulk of these remittances. Throughout the journey, expenses for Empress Dowager Cixi and the Guangxu Emperor were either remitted or delivered in cash by Shanxi Piaohao.

During the Republic of China period, the Qing Shanxi merchants based on conventional draft banks and tea trade had largely fallen. The prominent example of Shanxi merchants during this time is H. H. Kung, who was highly influential in determining the economic policies of the Kuomintang-led Nationalist government.

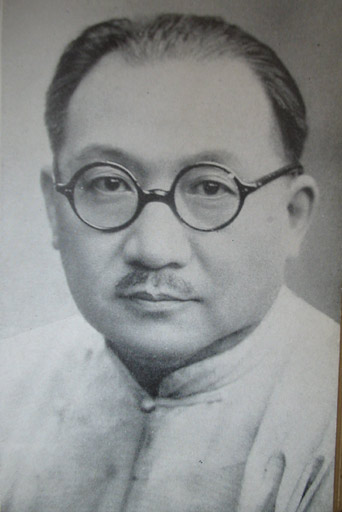
H. H. Kung, also known as Kong Xiangxi

== Legacies ==
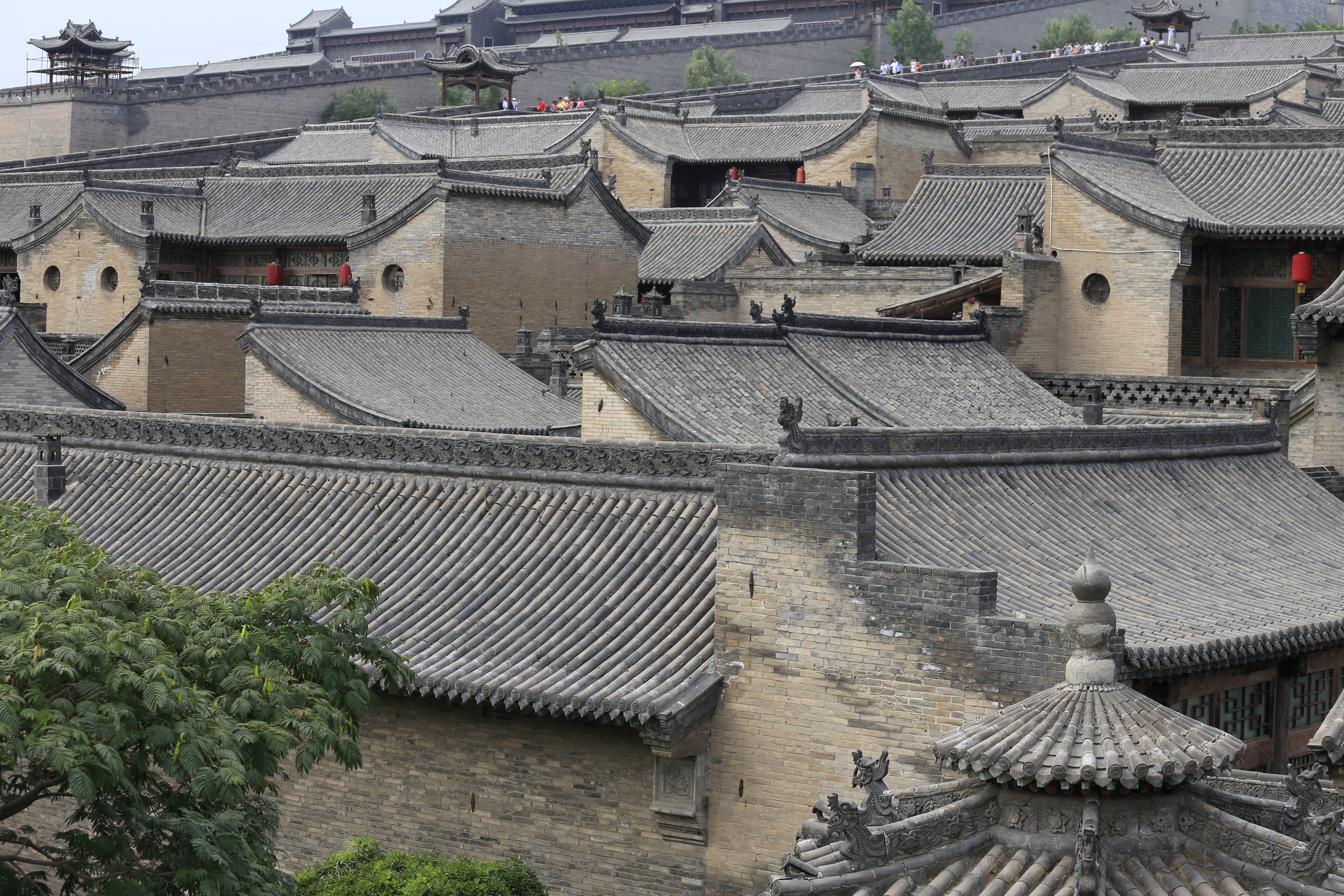
Gray roof tiles of the courtyards in Wang Family Compound

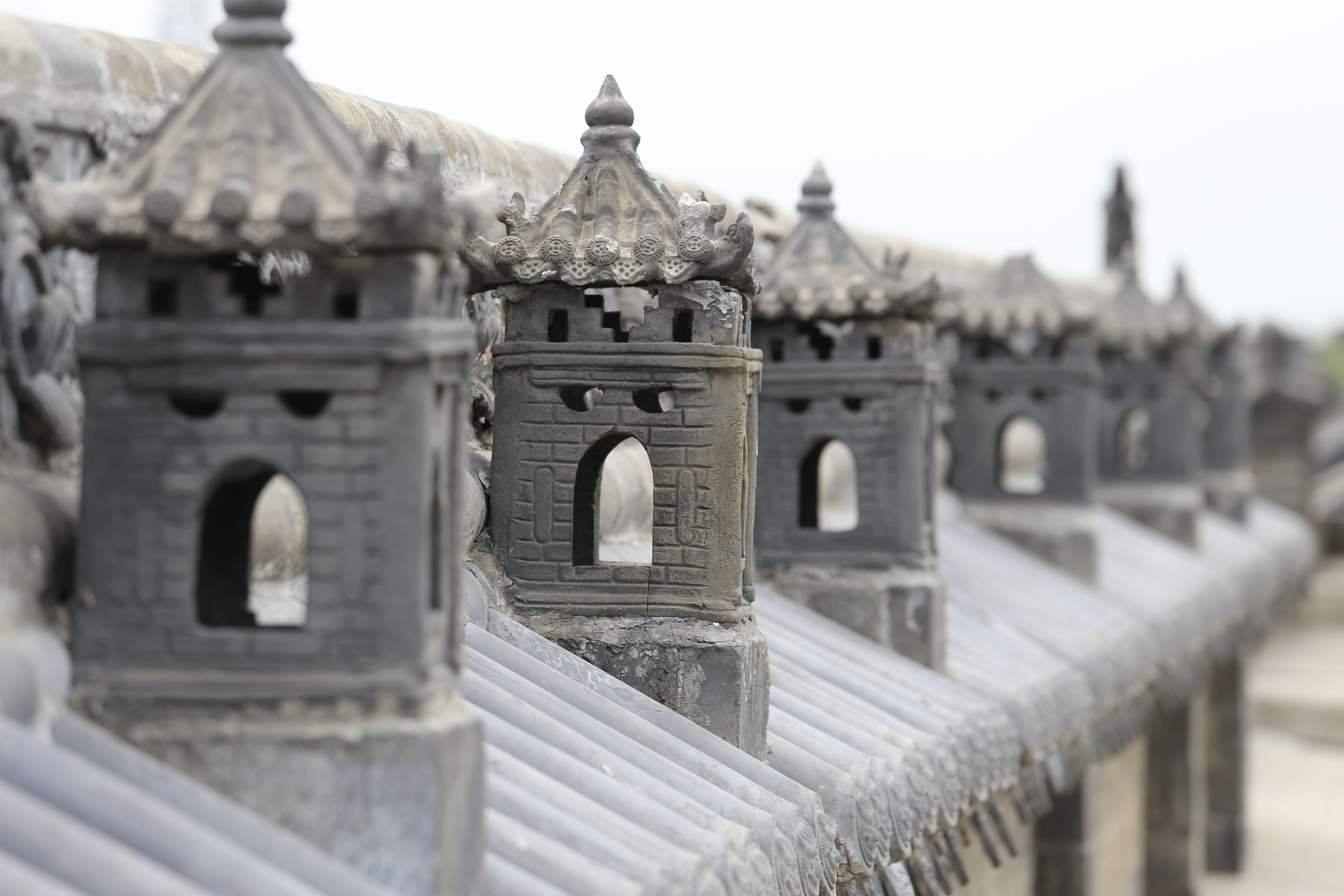
Roof top decorations in Wang Family Compound, in Lingshi

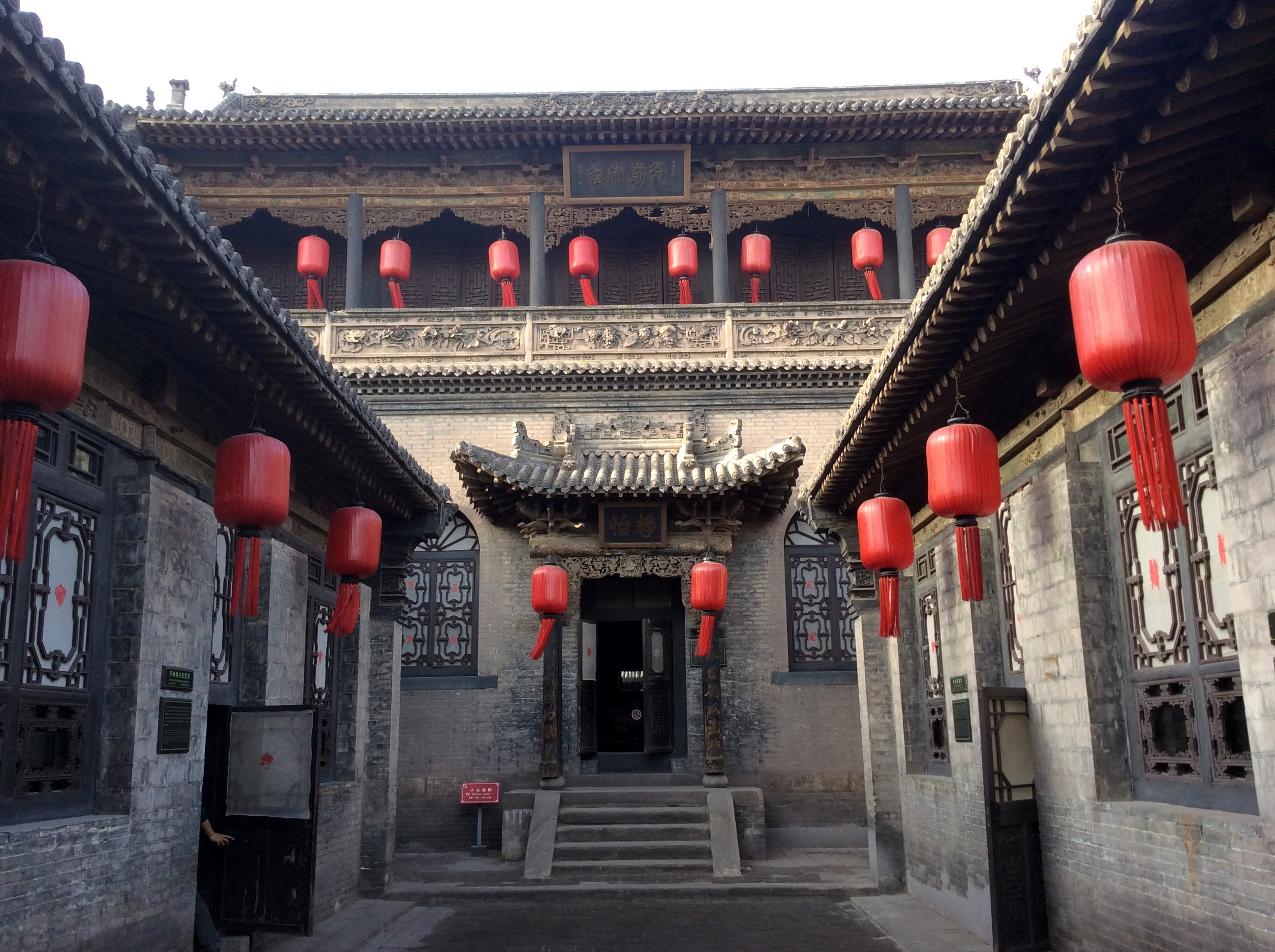
Qiao Family Compound, Jingyi Court in Qi County

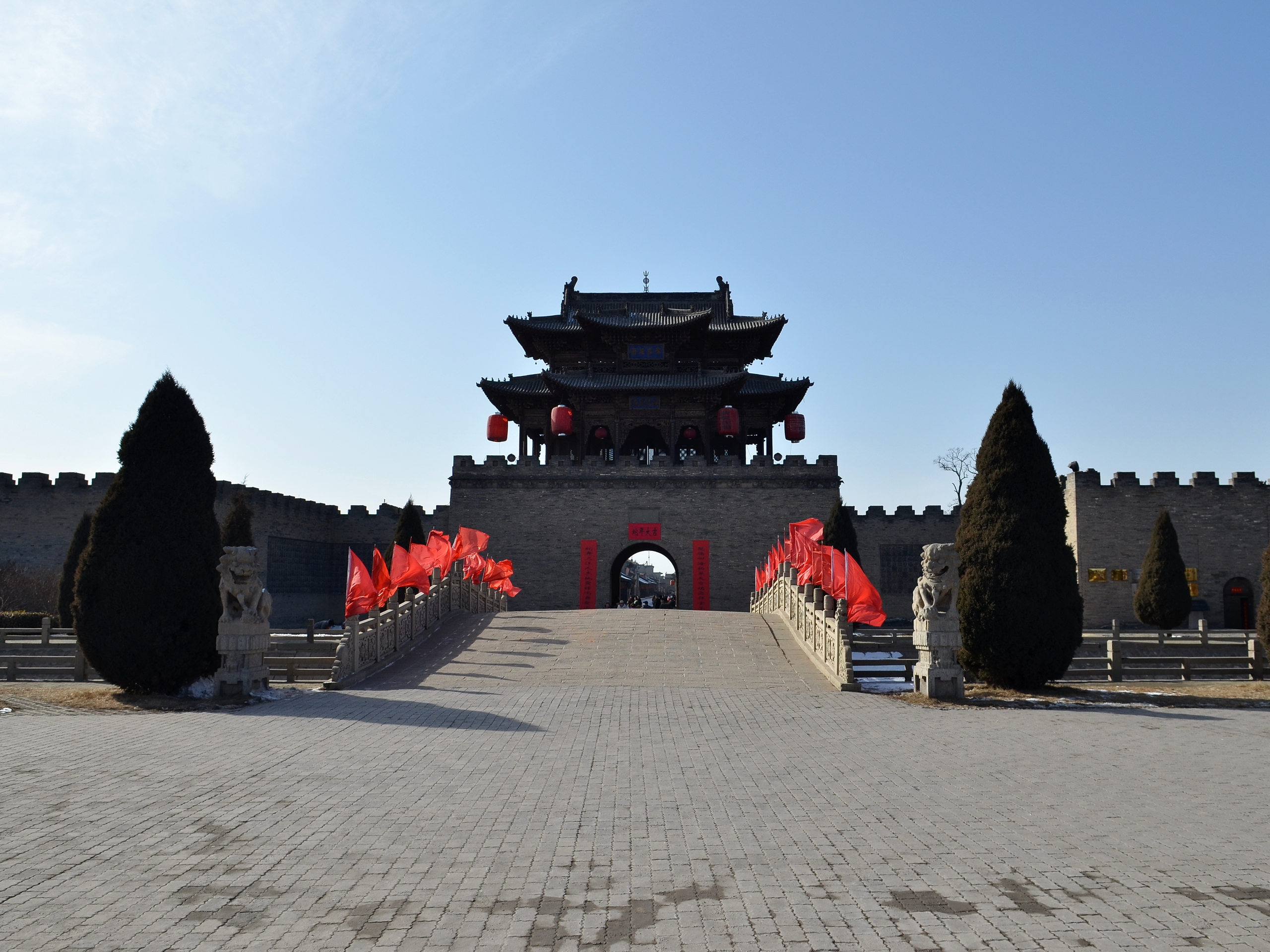
Chang Family Compound main gate, Yuci

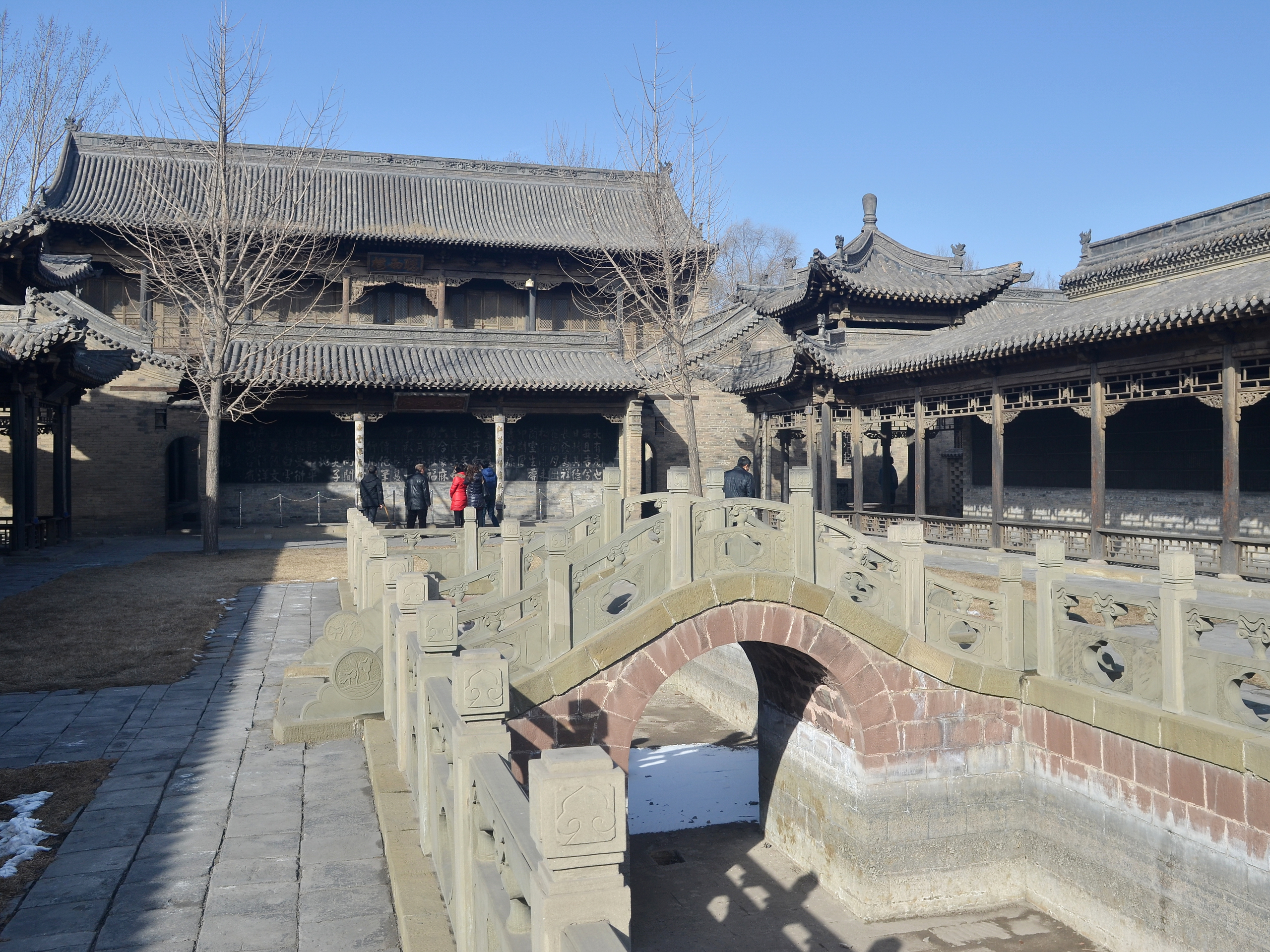
Chang Family Studies, Yuci

=== Business and culture legacy ===
Shanxi merchants were active for more than five hundred years from the early Ming dynasty, creating centuries-old prosperity, leaving significant business and cultural legacies. Among the diverse businesses scope that Shanxi merchants had worked on, there are two main trades, one is the draft bank system, or Piaohao, serving as the main financial institutions, and the other is the tea trade to Mongolia and Russia, in exchange of fur and European goods.

All piaohao were organised as single proprietaries or partnerships, where the owners carried unlimited liability. They concentrated on interprovincial remittances, and later on conducting government services. From the time of the Taiping Rebellion, when transportation routes between the capital and the provinces were cut off, piaohao began involvement with the delivery of government tax revenue. Piaohao grew by taking on a role in advancing funds and arranging foreign loans for provincial governments, issuing notes, and running regional treasuries.

To successfully run a nationwide financial system, credibility was of paramount importance for the draft banks. There were numerous stories that Shanxi draft banks honored their bank notes even after generations or major disasters. An honorary system to the highest degree was a main legacy of the Shanxi merchants.

They widely employed joint ventures among families living in the same villages or towns, yet they generally avoided using direct relative in the business management, direct relatives could only be owners together but not managers. This way they minimized the interference of personal bias based on kinship with professional business management.

They were the first to separate the ownership and management of businesses, which is crucial for professional business development, such as draft bank financial systems. The professionalism of Shanxi Merchants was also well-known. Their professionalism was characterized by dedication and focus.

The families of Shanxi Merchants were generally different from historically wealthy families, who gained wealth mainly through political privilege with key family members as bureaucrats in the court. A lot of Shanxi merchants tended to run businesses without ambition in politics. Although some of them did eventually seek higher social status by joining the Chinese bureaucratic system, and combined the business network and wealth with political power.

China Central Television created an eight-part documentary about them in 2006.

=== Wealth ===
According to the Qingbai leichao (清稗類鈔) compiled by Xu Ke, fourteen of the wealthiest Shanxi merchant families in the Guangxu period, headed by the Kang Family of Pingyang, held combined assets of over thirty million taels of silver.

=== Architecture legacy ===
The enormous wealth accumulated from the international trade and the financial institutions had enabled the Shanxi merchants to build luxurious family residences The houses and gardens built by them are culture and architecture heritages now, and most of these buildings are scattered throughout the central Shanxi basin.

The notable architecture complexes are:

- Wang Family Compound in Lingshi, which is the largest of the Shanxi Courtyard Houses.
- Qiao Family Compound in Qi County
- Qu Family Compound in Qi County
- Chang Family Compound in Yuci
- Cao Family Compound in Taigu
- The Kung Family Residence in Taigu, where H. H. Kung's family used to live.
- The Meng Family Courtyard in Taigu, later, this private family compound was transformed to the Ming Hsien school (銘賢學校), which is further incorporated as part of Shanxi Agricultural University.
- Shen Family Compound, (申家大院) in Changzhi.

== Origin of Shanxi Banks ==
Most mainstream scholars believe that the financial exchange business of Shanxi banks is a native innovation from China, originally a necessity to lower the transaction friction within different branches across China of the Xiyuecheng Dye Company, which later spreads beyond the dye business. while some western scholars (initially proposed by Randall Morck) hypothesize a potential influence from Russia or Britain.

=== Rishengchang ===
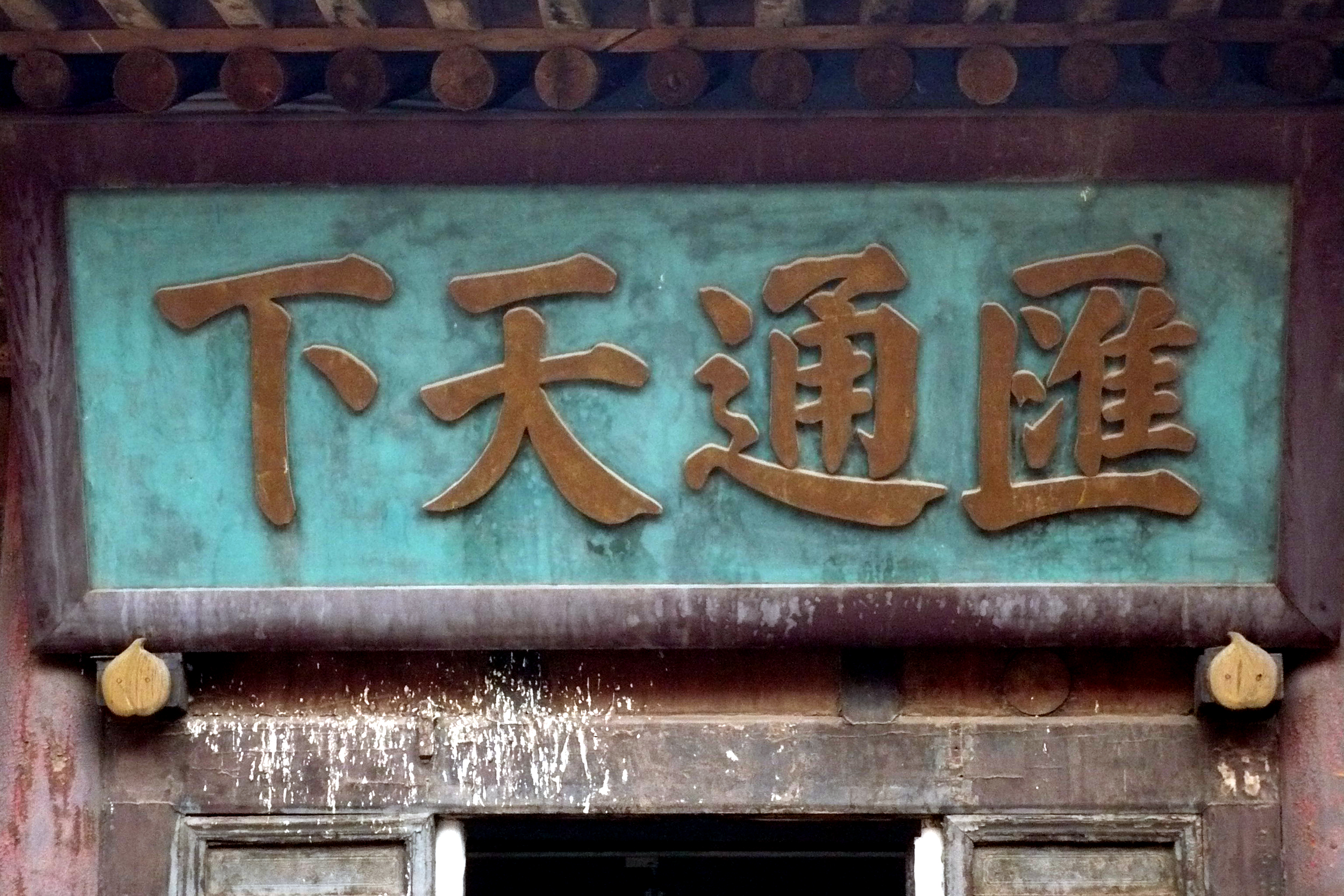
Royal inscribed board, saying "Financial exchange all over the world", in Rishengchang, Pingyao

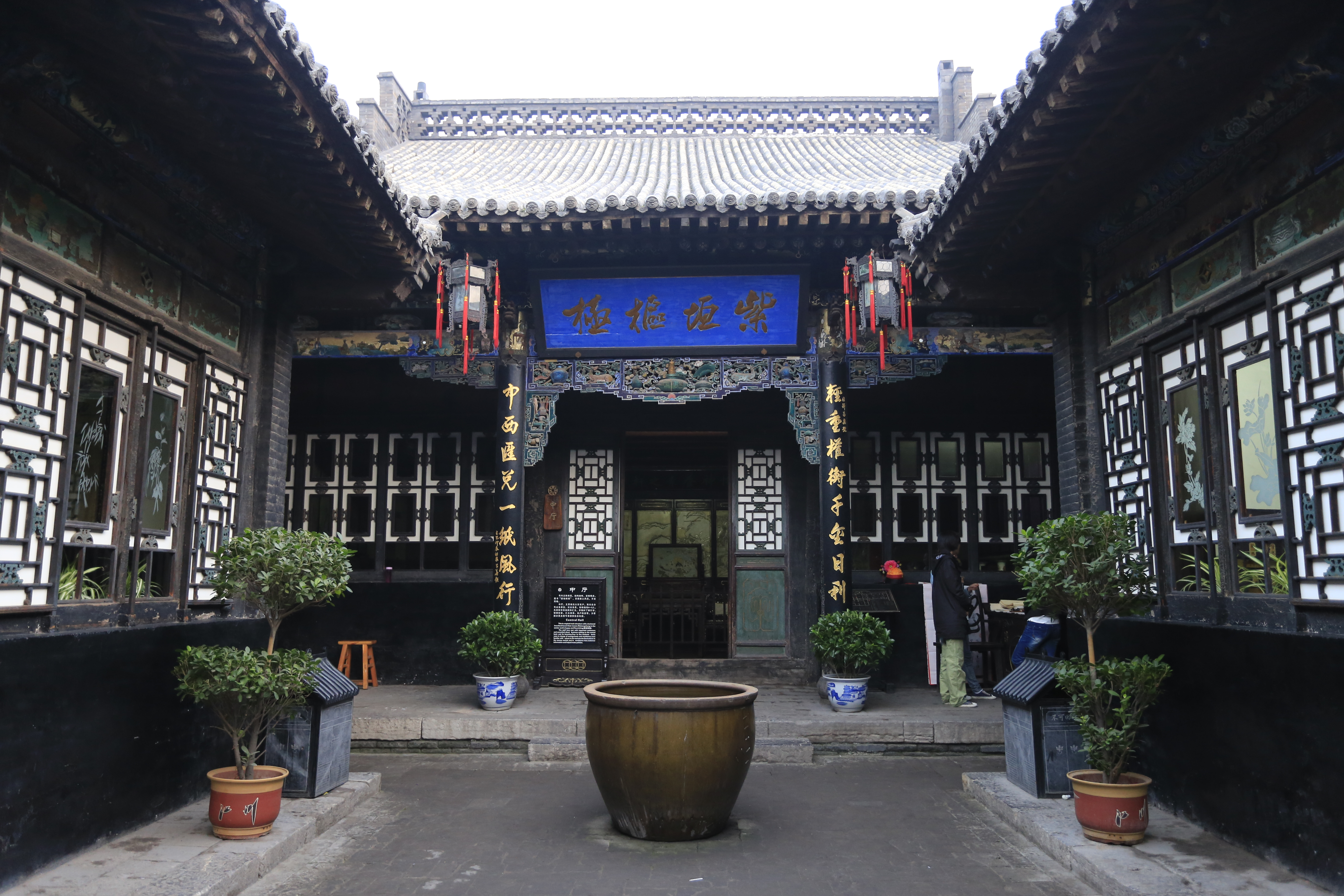
One courtyard in Rishengchang

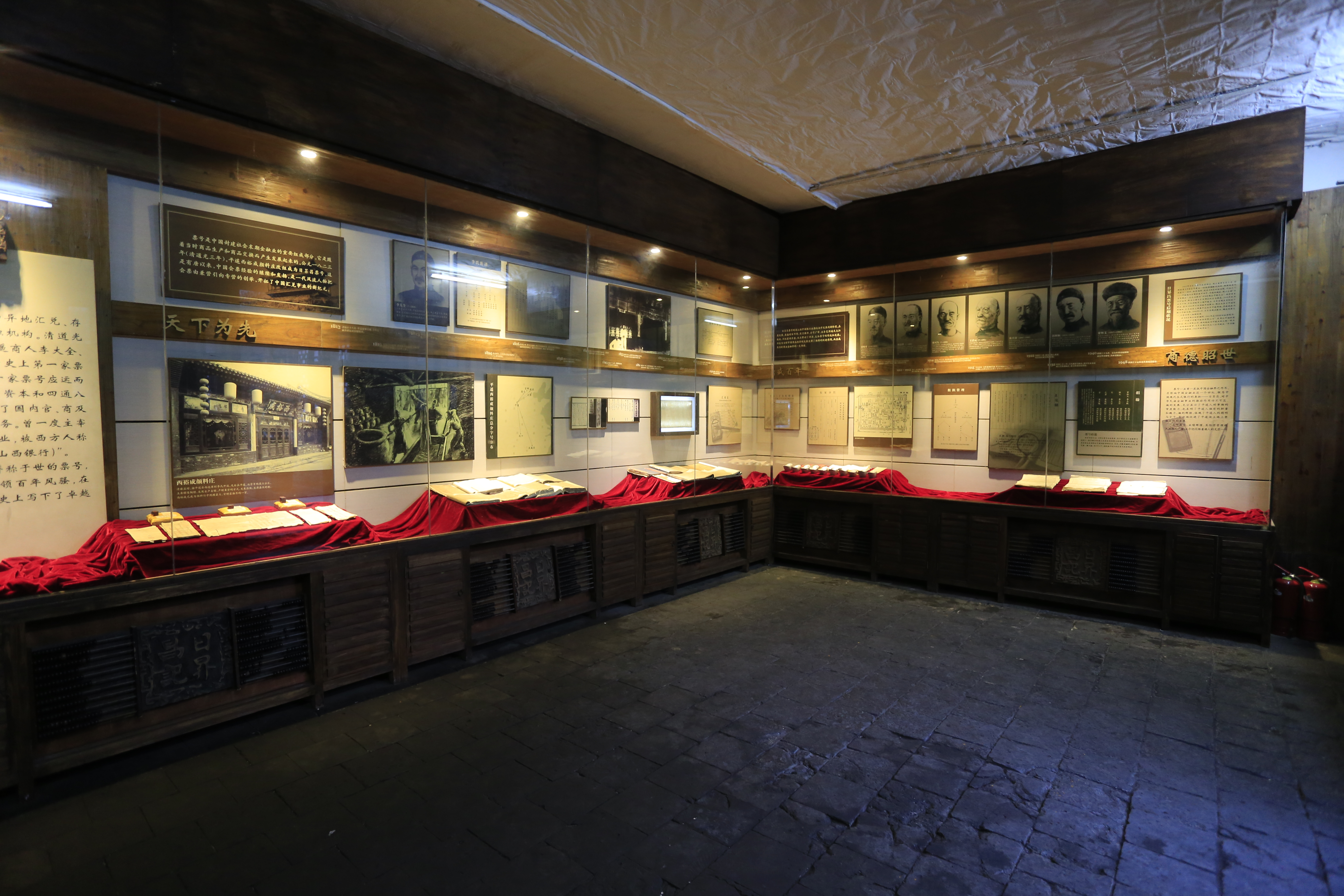
A modern museum of draft banks inside the rooms of Rishengchang

Rishengchang, the first draft bank or piaohao (票號), originated from Xiyuecheng Dye Company Pingyao in central Shanxi. Rishengchang was estimated to be founded during the Qing dynasty in 1823. However, the exact founding year remains controversial, some scholars argue it was found in 1797 or 1824. To deal with the transfer of large amounts of cash from one branch to another, the company introduced drafts, cashable in the company's many branches around China. Although this new method was originally designed for business transactions within the Xiyuecheng Company, it became so popular that in 1823 the owner gave up the dye business altogether and reorganized the company as a special remittance firm, Rishengchang Piaohao.

In the next thirty years, eleven piaohao were established in Shanxi province, including Pingyao and neighboring counties of Qi County, Taigu, and Yuci. By the end of the nineteenth century, thirty-two piaohao with 475 branches were in business covering most of China, and the central Shanxi region became the de facto financial centres of Qing China. The Chinese banking institutions of draft bank or piaohao were also known as Shanxi banks because they were owned primarily by Shanxi merchants.

All piaohao were organised as single proprietaries or partnerships, where the owners carried unlimited liability. They concentrated on interprovincial remittances, and later on conducting government services. From the time of the Taiping Rebellion, when transportation routes between the capital and the provinces were cut off, piaohao began involvement with the delivery of government tax revenue. Piaohao grew by taking on a role in advancing funds and arranging foreign loans for provincial governments, issuing notes, and running regional treasuries.

=== Geopolitical Background of Shanxi Draft Bank ===
During the Mongol Empire and Yuan dynasty, the Golden Horde and Chagatai Khanate ruled over the lands of Central Asia and further west, leading to the creation of prosperous business cities like those in Samarkand, Uzbekistan. During this time, the Silk Road was unified under one power, and traders like Marco Polo and Ibn Battuta across Eurasia could travel peacefully. However, after Mongol Empire was succeeded by several smaller states over the centuries, the overland Silk Road had become splintered and less used due to deterioration and political destabilization. Bandits had drained most of the region of commerce, and the subsequent Ming and Qing dynasties of China had overland power struggles with other political powers (the Ming competed with the Northern Yuan, and the Qing declined after the Opium Wars with European powers).

From the late 16th century, the Silk Road had become nearly impassable making it desolate for commercial purposes. Thus in the 19th century, the Shanxi merchants did business in the Xinjiang region, which was the entry into western China, but few merchants would trade along the further west along the former route itself at this point. As the trade had ceased in this region Western relic hunters of the 18th and 19th centuries would often describe ruins along the once magnificent trading and commercial route. The Ming dynasty had made trading through the sea illegal and following the Manchu conquest of the Ming dynasty, the Qing had ordered the depopulation of 16 kilometer wide area along the entire Chinese coast. The Qing army leveled all buildings and removed all residents of the area inland in three days, a move done to isolate Southern Ming dynasty rebels on Taiwan.

The quarantine band around the Chinese coast which was marked with signs stating "anyone found over this line shall be beheaded instantly", was thoroughly patrolled by the military of the Qing dynasty and the affected area was widened a total of three times. In the year 1683 the coastal areas of China were allowed to be resettled and in the year 1865 at the port cities of Guangzhou, Zhangzhou, Ningbo, and Yantai a more limited form of international trade was allowed by the government of the Qing dynasty. This very limited form of international trade along some parts of the Chinese coast was ended when, in the year 1757, the Qianlong Emperor had closed off all of these port cities to foreigners once again. Limited trade resumed in Guangzhou following the uninvited arrival of British ships in the year 1759 and the restricted reopening of the city a year later in 1760.

The restrictions placed on foreign trade by the government of the Qing dynasty was known as the cohong system (or the kung hung system), only select Chinese merchants were allowed to trade with pre-screened and completely unarmed male foreign merchants on a riverbank outside of the city walls of Guangzhou for a limited time during a designated "trading season", and the trade conducted during these "trading seasons" had strict quotas. These dealings were supervised by corrupt government officials that were seeking bribes from the parties involved.

During this era foreigners doing business in China risked unpredictable fines imposed on them by corrupt government officials, enthusiastic torture, imprisonment based on arbitrary accusations, and instant death until the year 1842, this was when the British were victorious in the First Opium War. The government of the Qing dynasty was forced to open four more port cities, known as treaty ports, and Common Law enclaves were established in all five Chinese treaty port cities under the treaty.

As the piaohao came into existence during this period of xenophobia, they were an independently formed Chinese parallel to the European banking system created by the Shanxi merchants and because trade along the Chinese coastlines was so restricted the Shanxi merchants managed to form international trade networks across different routes.

=== Trade with the Russian Empire ===
During its history, the banking industry in China has evolved parallel to that of the western world, the sudden appearance of genuine banks and financial companies from Europe in China exposed this. It is suspected that the banks created by the Shanxi merchants might have actually been inspired by western banks due to their trade with Russia. As the Silk Road had become completely choked off by the time of the Qing dynasty, and its government had the Chinese ports basically hermetically sealed off from foreign trade, only a small amount of international trade through the Gobi Desert was conducted starting in Shanxi. The Russian Empire was eager to engage in trade with the Chinese, every year the Shanxi merchants would transport various goods such as silk, cloth, tea, sugar, cigarettes, and porcelain to the city of Lanzhou and the territory of Xinjiang, as well as through the city of Kyakhta to the branches of the Shanxi merchants in far away cities like Moscow and the Russian capital city of St. Petersburg. Chinese tea was imported primarily in the form of hefty hard-packed tea bricks which allowed each camel to carry large quantities in a more compact manner and were sometimes used as an alternative currency.

The trade routes between imperial Russia and the Qing dynasty was known as the "Tea Road" and following the signing of the Kyakhta Treaty in the year 1727 the trading posts of Kyakhta, Zuluhaitu, and Nerchinsk were opened to trade with the Chinese, though only Kyakhta ever saw any significant trade and basically all goods from and to China went through the city. Kyakhta was strategically located next to Outer Mongolia. The Tea Road was a trade route extending 13,000 kilometers through land, crossing more than 200 cities in China (including Outer Mongolia), and Russia with its influence extending beyond these countries.

Initially, the imperial Russian state maintained a complete monopoly on the lucrative trade with China, furthermore the government of the Qing dynasty required a prior preclearance of all exported goods in its capital city of Beijing, this policy initially meant that trade between the two countries was minimal. But in the year 1755, the government of the Qing dynasty dispensed with preclearance. Trade saw another boom when Catherine the Great had opened up the city of Kyakhta to private Russian merchants in the year 1762. By the mid-1800s Shanxi merchants were selling long Boyar caravans full of exported goods that headed to St. Petersburg for resale to the rest of Europe and the Americas. The Shanxi merchants were the dominant Chinese merchants operating in Kyakhta and the rest of Russia along the Tea Road. Both the Russians and the Shanxi merchants benefitted greatly from this trade until the Qing was forced to open up several of its port cities following its defeat in the Opium Wars.

The Shanxi province itself did not plant tea itself, but the Shanxi merchants sold Chinese tea around the world through the route. The Tea Road route along which the old Shanxi merchants were the major force behind the international Chinese tea business started from the Wuyi Mountains in the province of Fujian in Southeast China, this mountain was notably the birthplace of many of China's renowned teas.

=== Possible Russian and British influence on modern piaohao ===
While the Shanxi merchants entered Russia, banks in imperial Russia took deposits, they made loans, exchanged different currencies, and let merchants and traders transfer funds to each other, though they primarily only made loans to noblemen they favoured. Furthermore, the banks in Russia were constantly unstable and felt high pressure to lend money to court favourites.

The imperial Russian capital city of St. Petersburg was the westernmost known location of a Shanxi merchant operation, furthermore the city was also the doorway of Russia to the rest of Europe. Because of its status, St. Petersburg also housed many branch offices of Western European banking and financial companies, Thompstone in 2004 described the city as being "a 'City of London' in miniature" due to the huge influence of British merchants and their banks over the city of St. Petersburg.

The 2010 paper "The Shanxi Banks" by Randall Morck and Fan Yang claimed that it was plausible that Shanxi merchants could have been inspired by these British banks to create the modern piaohao, even though there is no solid evidence of this claim. Shanxi merchant Li Daquan, who while running the Xiyucheng dyed goods company's operations, organized the silver shipments between the city of Tianjin and the province of Shanxi. The goods shipped to Tianjin would have first gone through Kalgan, where the Russian Kyakhta caravans would pass beneath the Great Wall. They proposed that Li Daquan had heard about how the European banking system worked through other Shanxi merchants that had done business in European Russia and that he decided to try it in China. Randall Morck and Fan Yang claimed that Li Daquan deliberately omitted saying that his ideas that established the piaohao were of European origin as an extreme culture of xenophobia existed in the Qing dynasty at the time.

=== Possible reasons for success of Shanxi merchants ===
There are many proposed reasons as to why the Shanxi merchants found success during the Qing dynasty while merchants from other provinces were generally less successful. One proposition is that the province of Shanxi benefitted from gold and silver that was stolen out of the imperial treasury of the declining Ming dynasty. In the year 2007 a coin board of 1.5 ton pre-Ming cash coins was discovered at a construction site in the province of Shanxi, which gave this proposed reason more credence.

Another plausible explanation for the position that Shanxi merchants had is based on defecting 1640s Ming soldiers reappearing in the Shanxi province acting as private security to the region's merchants, this gave the merchants from this province a distinct edge under waning rule of law during the transition from Ming to Qing. A similar hypothesis proposes that hiding 1640s Ming soldiers were redirecting their talents to commerce. While locals from Shanxi were oddly absent from the top rank imperial exam records during the Qing dynasty, the dynasty's 19th-century enthusiasm for the services of the piaohao asperses this hypothesis somewhat.

The most plausible explanation of the financial prominence of the province of Shanxi states that its salt works at Xiechi Lake fostered mercantile activity that would ultimately need banks. A state salt monopoly held by the imperial government persisted, with only a few minor interruptions, from the Han dynasty until the year 1370 during the second year of the Ming dynasty. In 1370 the army of the Ming began using its salt rights, known as yan yin, which were initially redeemable only at the Xiechi Lake, to pay for transporting provisions to Chinese soldiers stationed on the Great Wall. As the Shanxi merchants were handling this lucrative business from its very beginnings, they managed to get a piece of the Ming state's monopoly and the imperial government quite likely netted more revenues of the salt monopoly because of higher overall efficiency. This policy that benefited the Shanxi merchants remained in effect long enough for them to accumulate a substantial amount of wealth for themselves. This hypothesis regarding the rise of the Shanxi merchants also accords with evidence that the region comprising the current Shanxi province was not an important commercial centre until the reign of the Ming dynasty.

== See also ==
- Shanxi
- Piaohao
- Yan Xishan
