= Zhenguo Temple =

Buddhist temple in Pingyao County, Shanxi, China

Coordinates: 37°17′08″N 112°16′15″E

- 鎮國寺
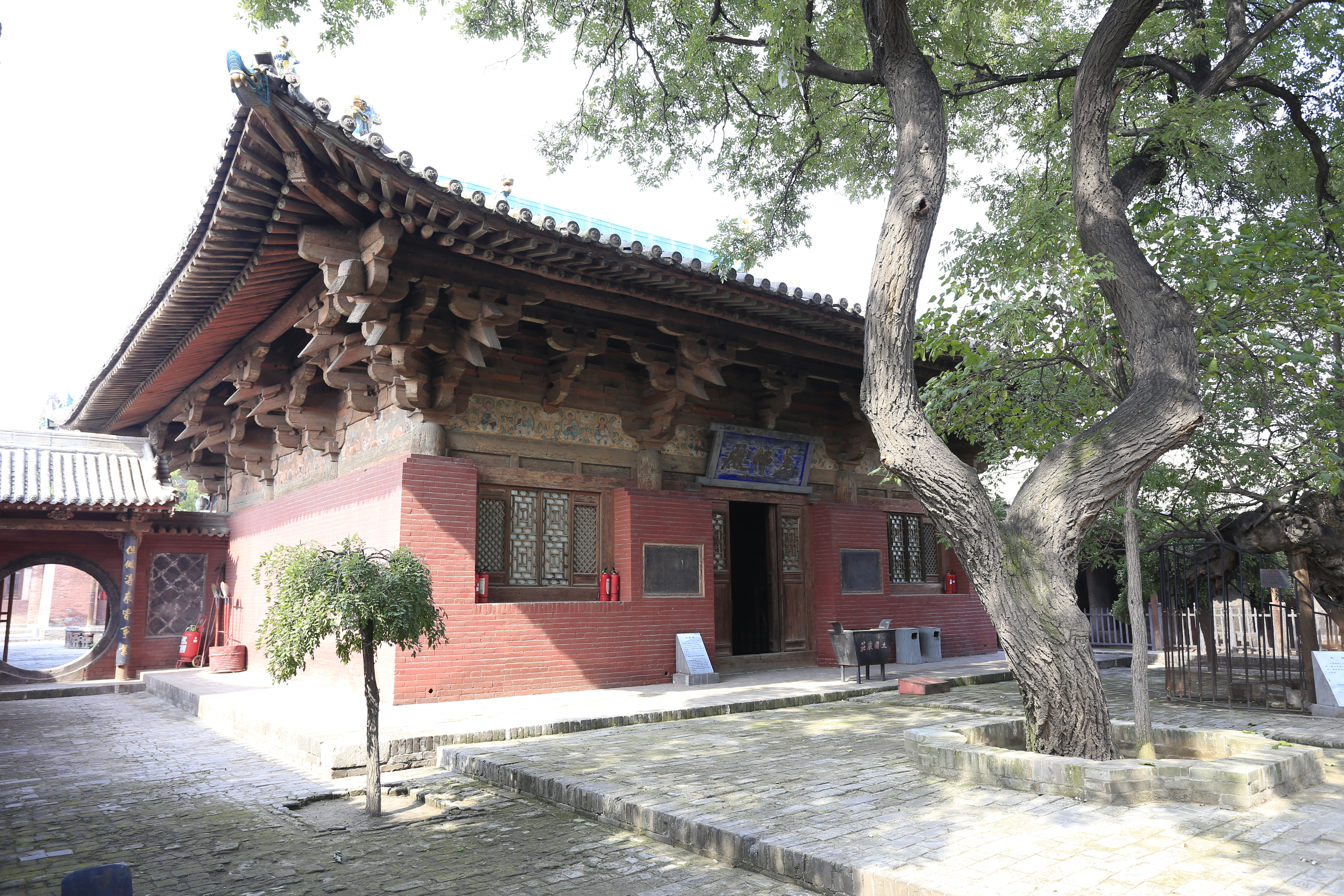
- The Ten-Thousand Buddha Hall (Wànfó diàn) of Zhenguo Temple

Religion
- Affiliation: Buddhist
- Province: Shanxi

Location
- Location: Pingyao
- Interactive map of Zhenguo Temple

Architecture
- Completed: 963; Northern Han dynasty

Zhenguo Temple
- "Zhenguo Temple" in Simplified (top) and Traditional (bottom) Chinese characters
- Traditional Chinese: 鎮國寺
- Simplified Chinese: 镇国寺
Transcriptions
Standard Mandarin
- Hanyu Pinyin: Zhènguó sì
- Wade–Giles: Chen^{4}-kuo^{2} ssu^{4}
- IPA: [ʈʂə̂n.kwǒ sɨ̂]
Wu
- Suzhounese: Tsen5-kueq7 zy6
Yue: Cantonese
- Yale Romanization: Jan-gwok jih
- Jyutping: Zan^{3}-gwok^{3} zi^{6}
Southern Min
- Tâi-lô: Tìn-kok sī

Zhenguo Temple (simplified Chinese: 镇国寺; traditional Chinese: 鎮國寺) is a Buddhist temple located 10 km from Pingyao in the village of Hadongcun, in Shanxi Province, China. The temple's oldest hall, the Wanfo Hall, was built in 963 during the Northern Han dynasty, and is notable for featuring very large brackets that hold up the roof and flying eaves. The sculptures inside the hall are among the only examples of 10th century Buddhist sculpture in China.

== History ==
The history of the temple begins in 963, when it was recorded that Ten-Thousand Buddha Hall (Wànfó diàn 万佛殿) was built. The date is written on a beam in the hall, and is also the date given by a local history of Pingyao county written in the 19th century. A stela written in 1819 also confirms this date. Wanfo Hall is the oldest building at Zhenguo temple, and is the only surviving building that dates from the short-lived Northern Han dynasty. Although little is known of the temple's history, stelae record that it was renovated in 1540 and in 1816. In 1997, along with Pingyao city and Shuanglin Temple, the Zhenguo temple was inscribed on the World Heritage list as ‘Ancient City of Pingyao’.

== Layout ==
The temple contains two main halls and a gate, with two courtyards in between the three buildings. There is a wall surrounding the entire complex. The temple opens to the south, with the Tianwang Hall (天王殿) acting as the temple's gate. The next hall, to the north, is the Ten-Thousand Buddha Hall, and the final hall is called Sanfo Hall (三佛殿), which dates from the Qing dynasty. The northern courtyard also features two minor halls facing to the east and west called the Guanyin (观音殿) and Dizang Halls (地藏殿), which both date from the Ming dynasty. There are also two bell towers located on either side of the Tianwang Hall.

=== Ten-Thousand Buddha Hall ===
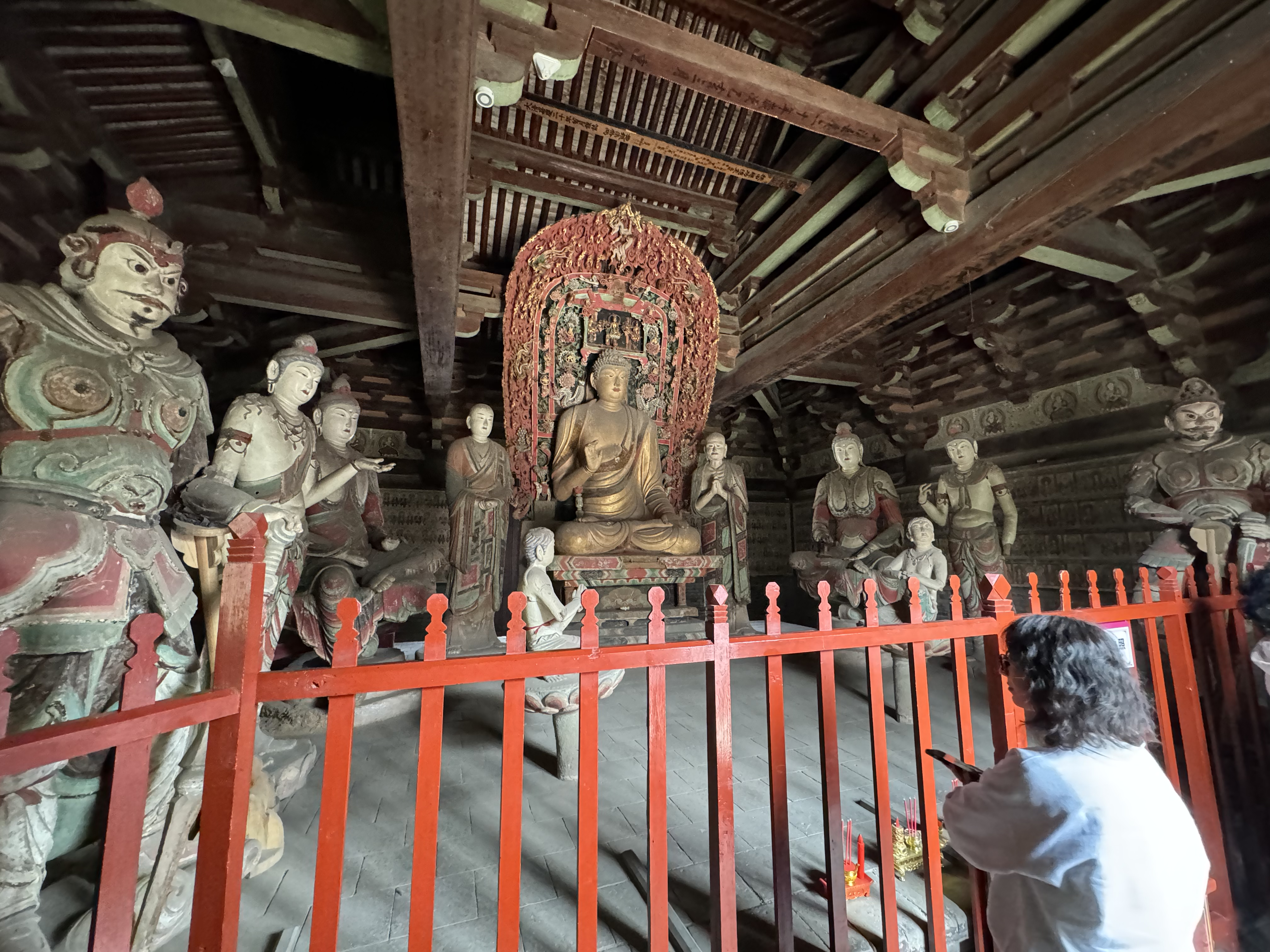
Statues within the hall

The most important hall in the temple is Ten-Thousand Buddha Hall (Wànfó diàn 万佛殿), one of China's oldest wooden buildings. It is a three-bay single-eaves hip and gabled hall that is nearly square in shape, measures 11.6 by 10.8 meters, and is 8.8 m high. Despite the building's small size, and features that would identify it as a regular hall (such as pillars that have been implanted directly into the floor instead of on a stone pedestal), the structure is quite complex. There are doors at the front and back of the hall. In addition, the front of the hall has two windows on either side of the door. There are twelve pillars supporting the structure. The corner and column-top brackets holding up the roof are of the 7th degree, one of the most complex and large types according to Yingzao Fashi. These bracket sets are nearly 2.5 meters high – 70% the height of the columns. Inter-columnar brackets that occur between every two pillars are of the 5th degree. The hall has no ceiling, and the upper and lower set of rafters are exposed. Nancy Steinhardt speculates that the complex brackets on what would have been a humble structure were an attempt by the Northern Han rulers to build a magnificent structure with limited resources.

The hall contains eleven sculptures from the Northern Han period. These are the only Chinese sculptures from the period that survive from outside the Mogao Grottoes. There is a main statue of Sakyamuni flanked by Bodhisattvas and the Heavenly Kings.

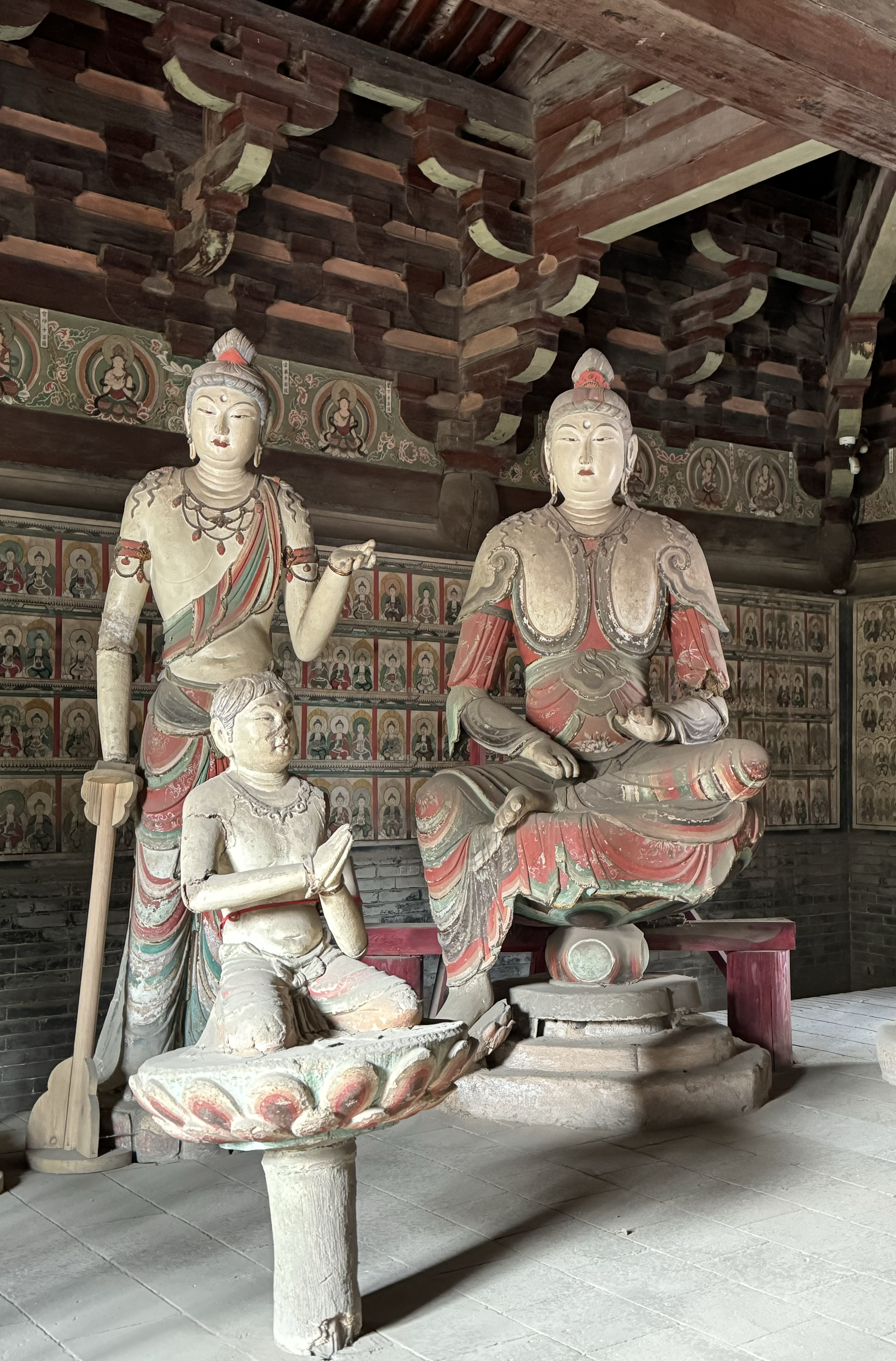

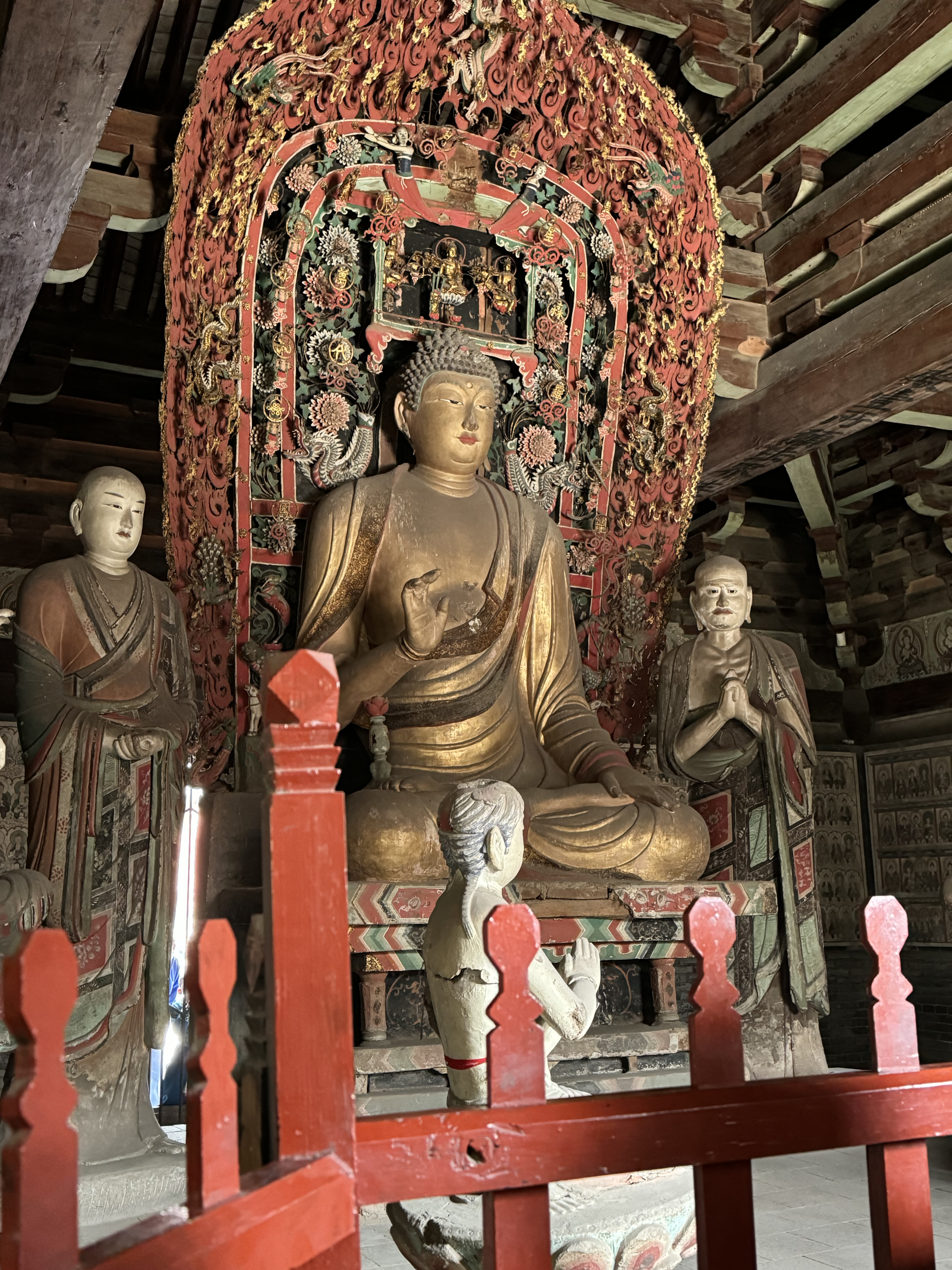

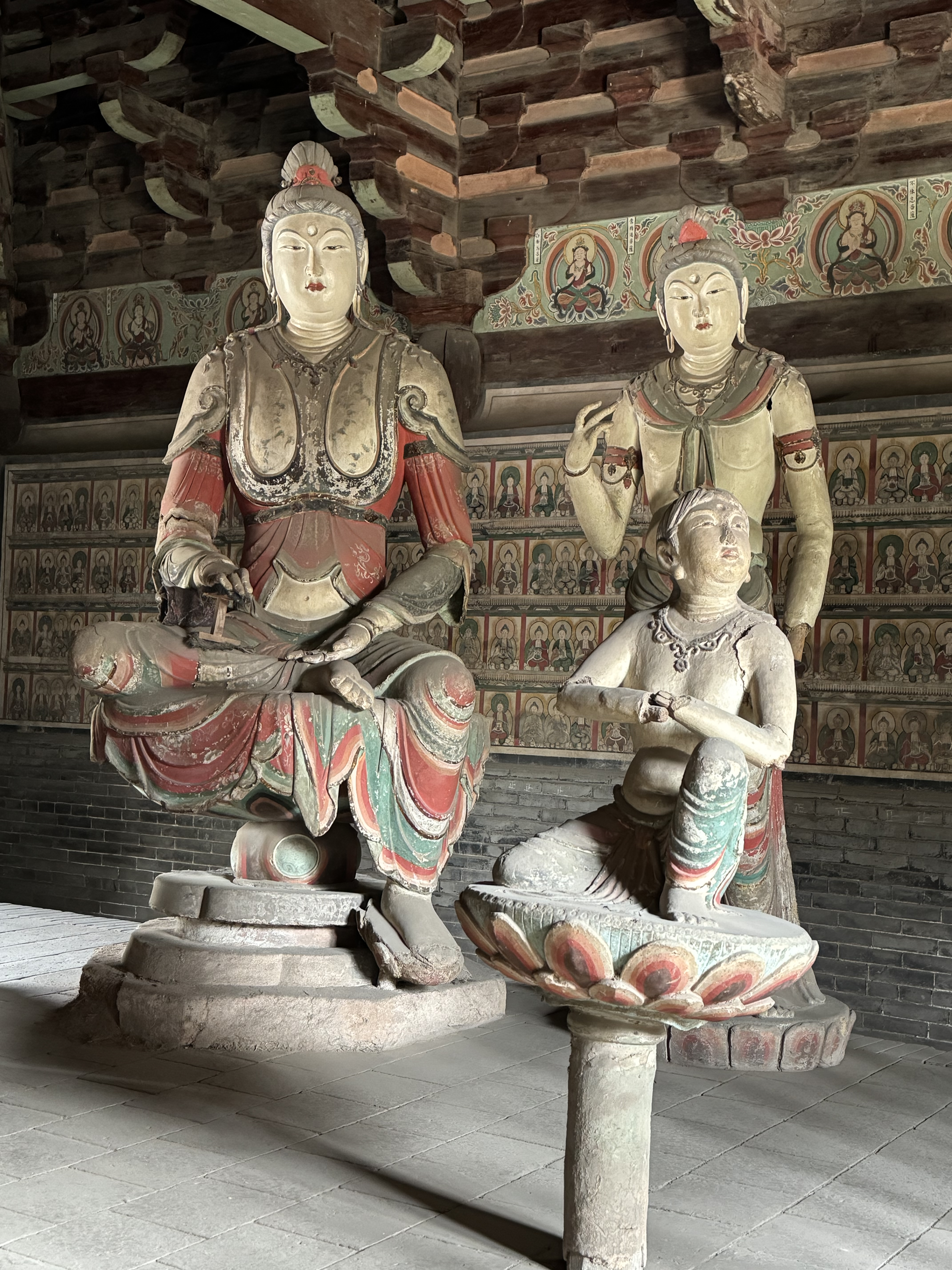
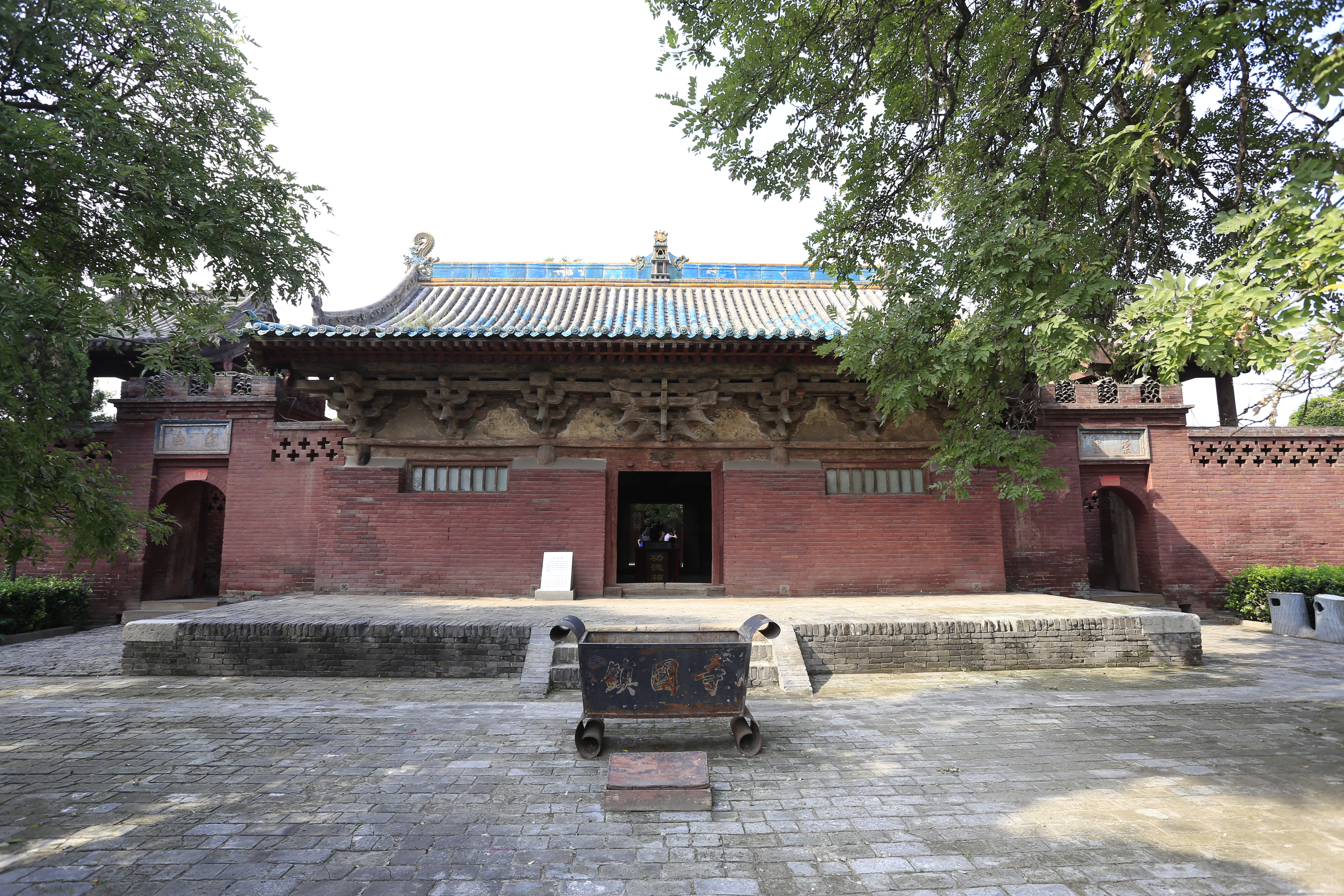
Tianwang Hall

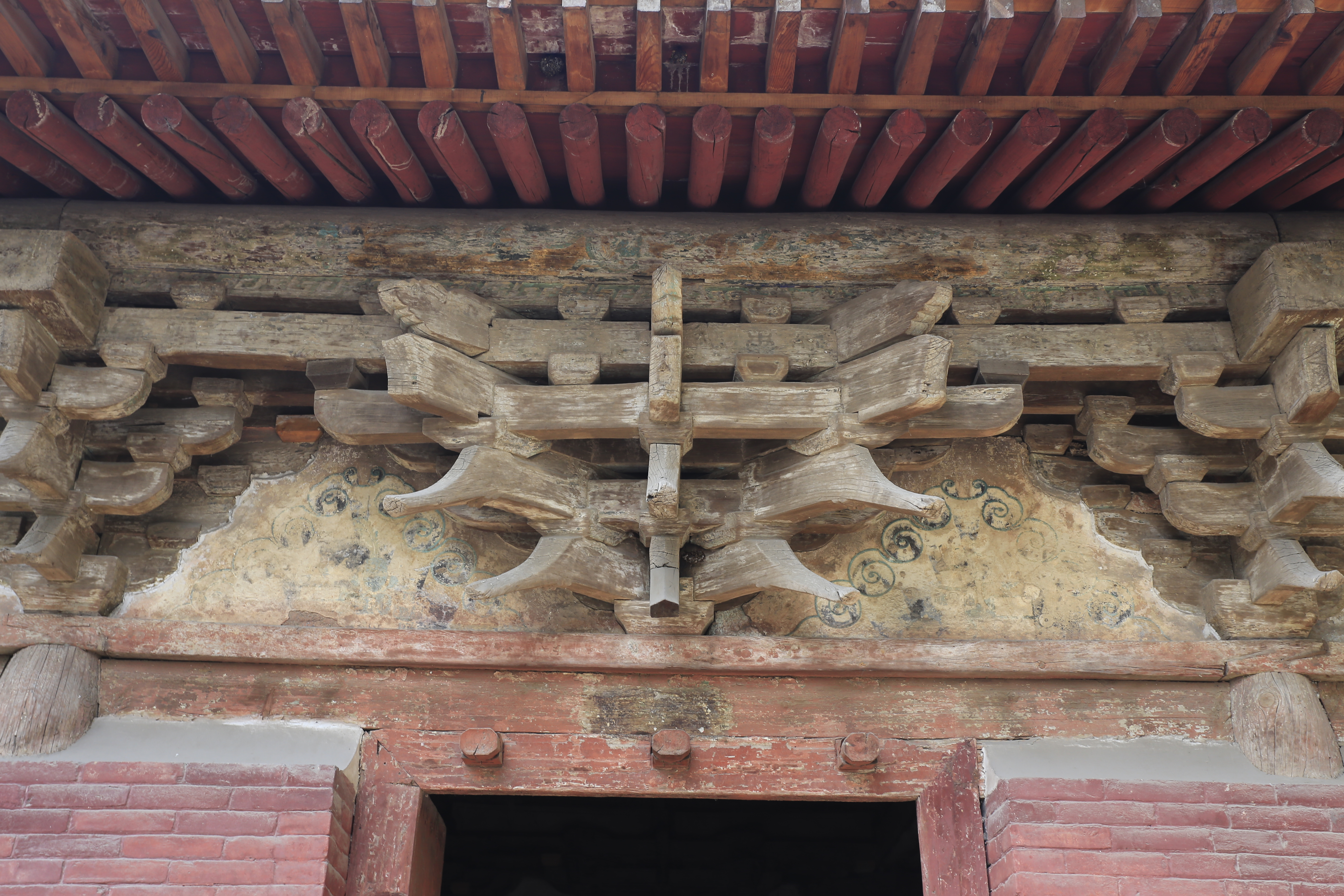
Tianwang Hall

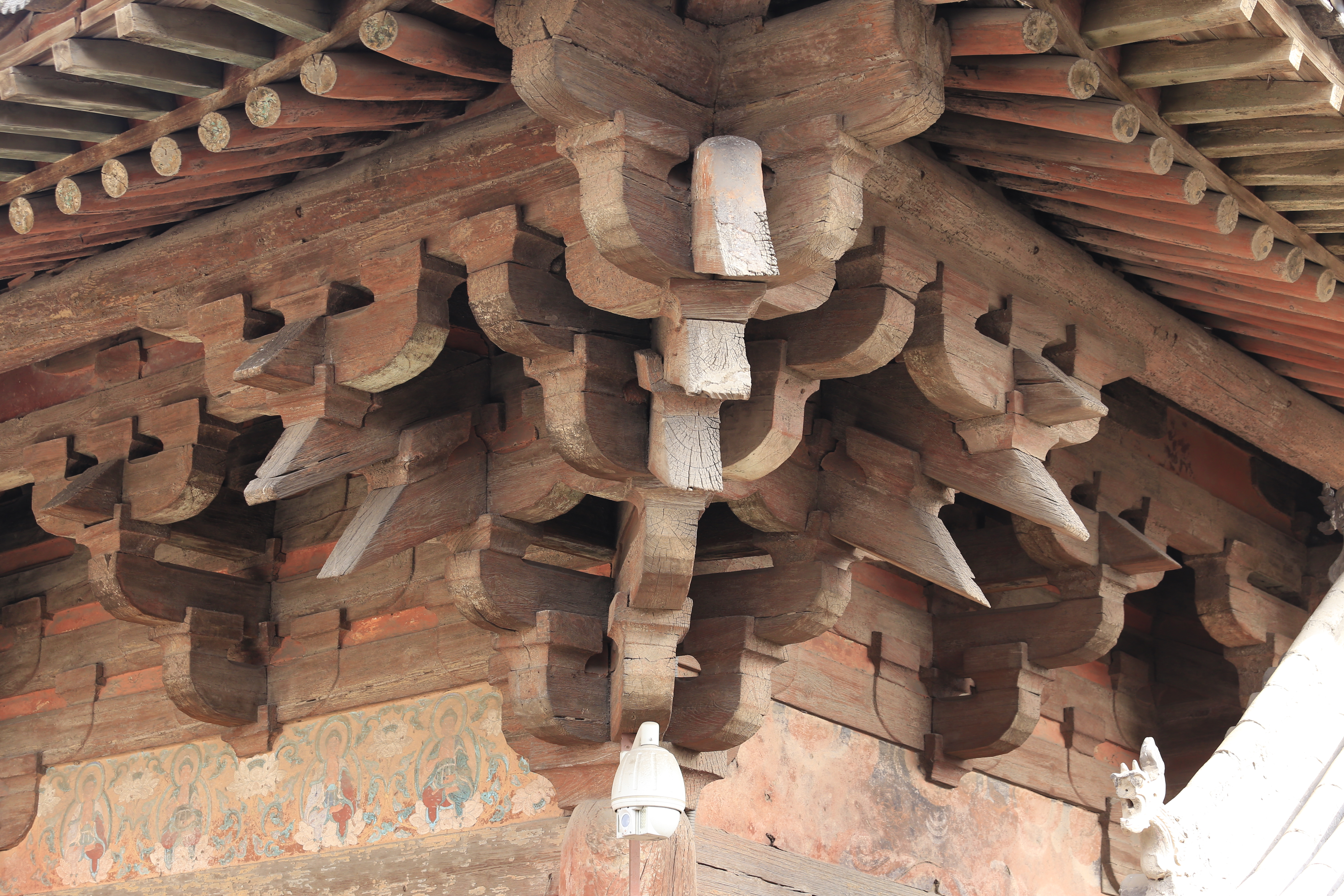
Wanfo Hall

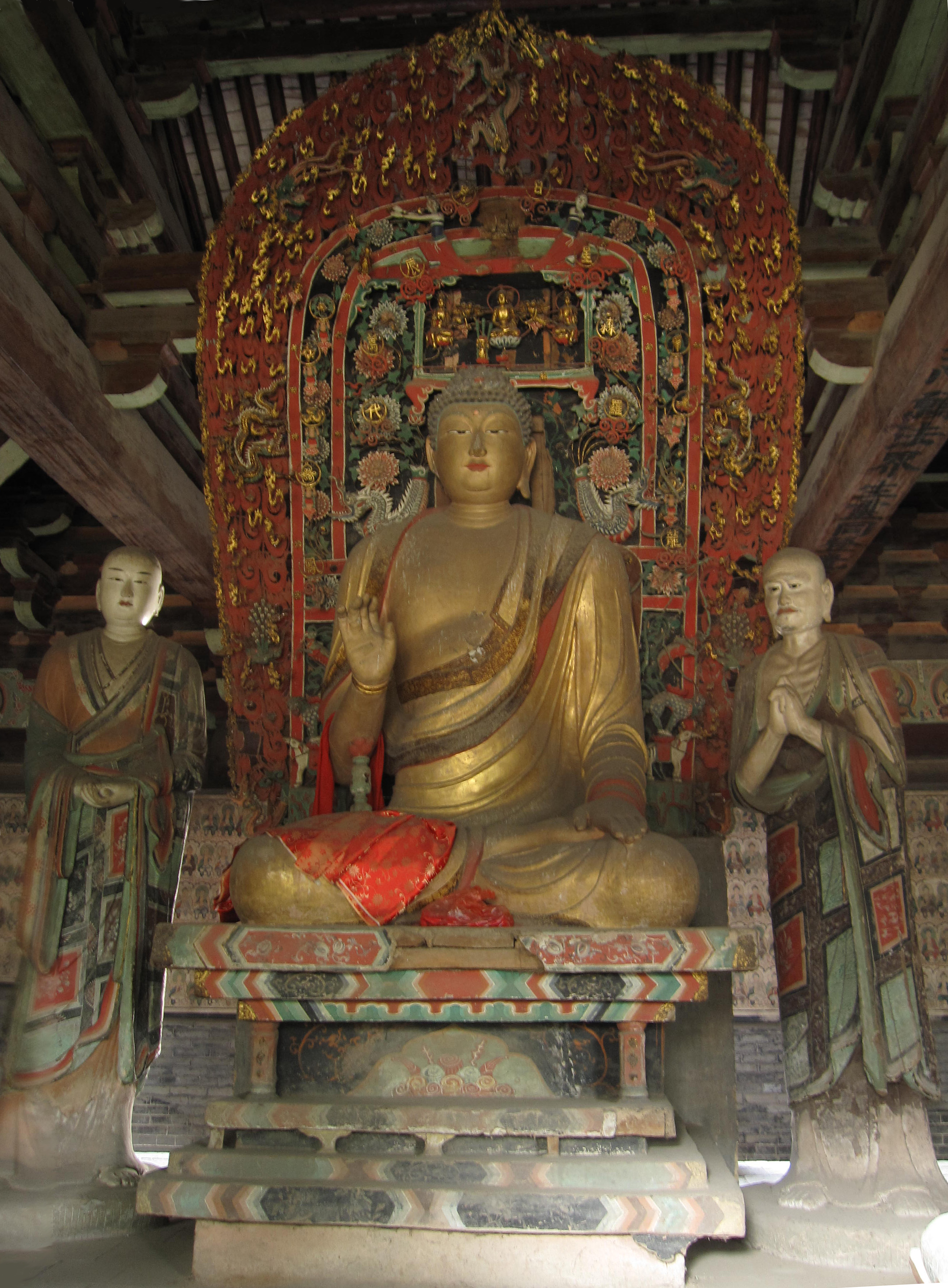
Statues inside the Wanfo Hall

== Image Gallery of Wanfo (Ten thousand Buddha) Hall Statues ==
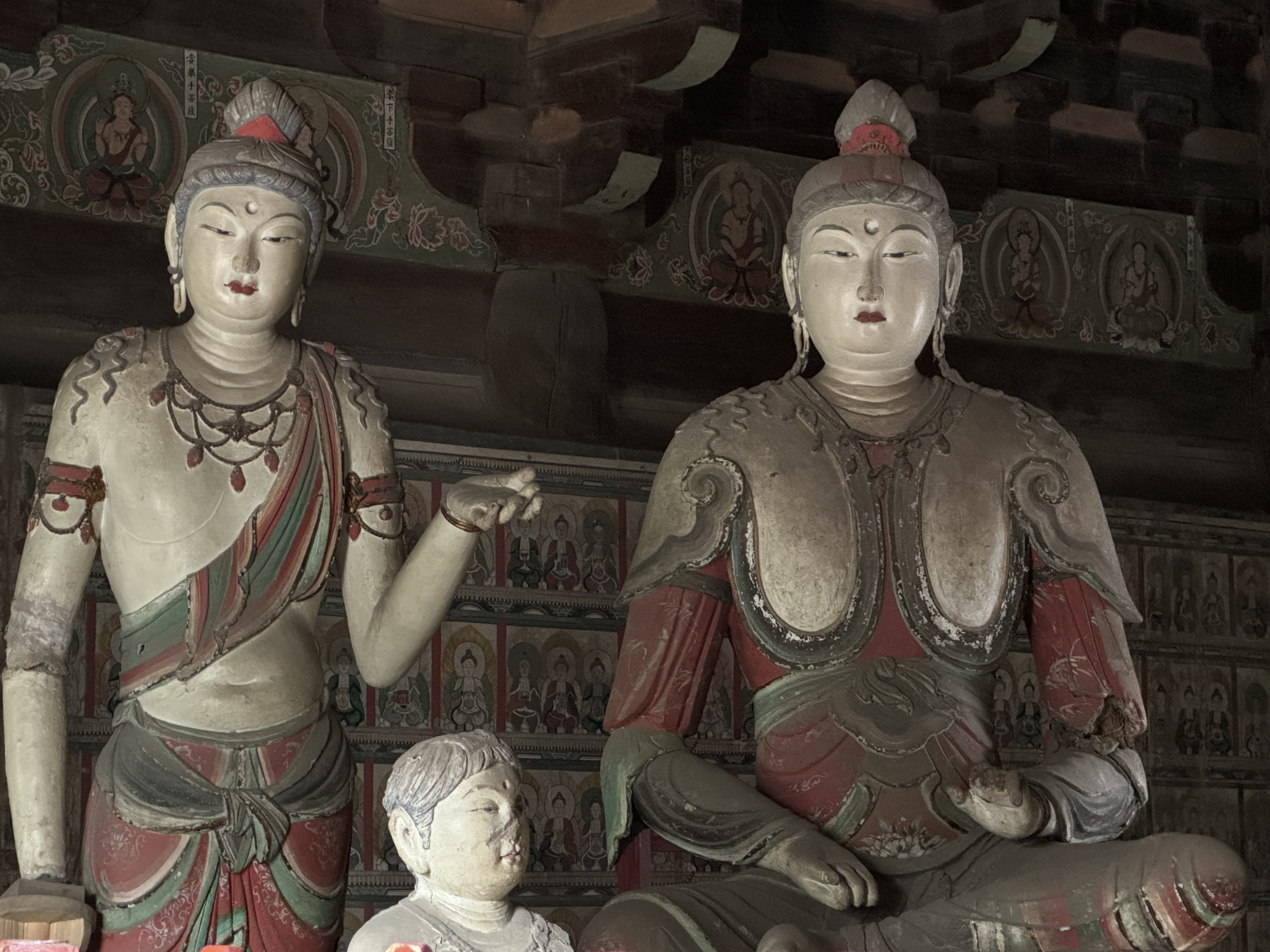

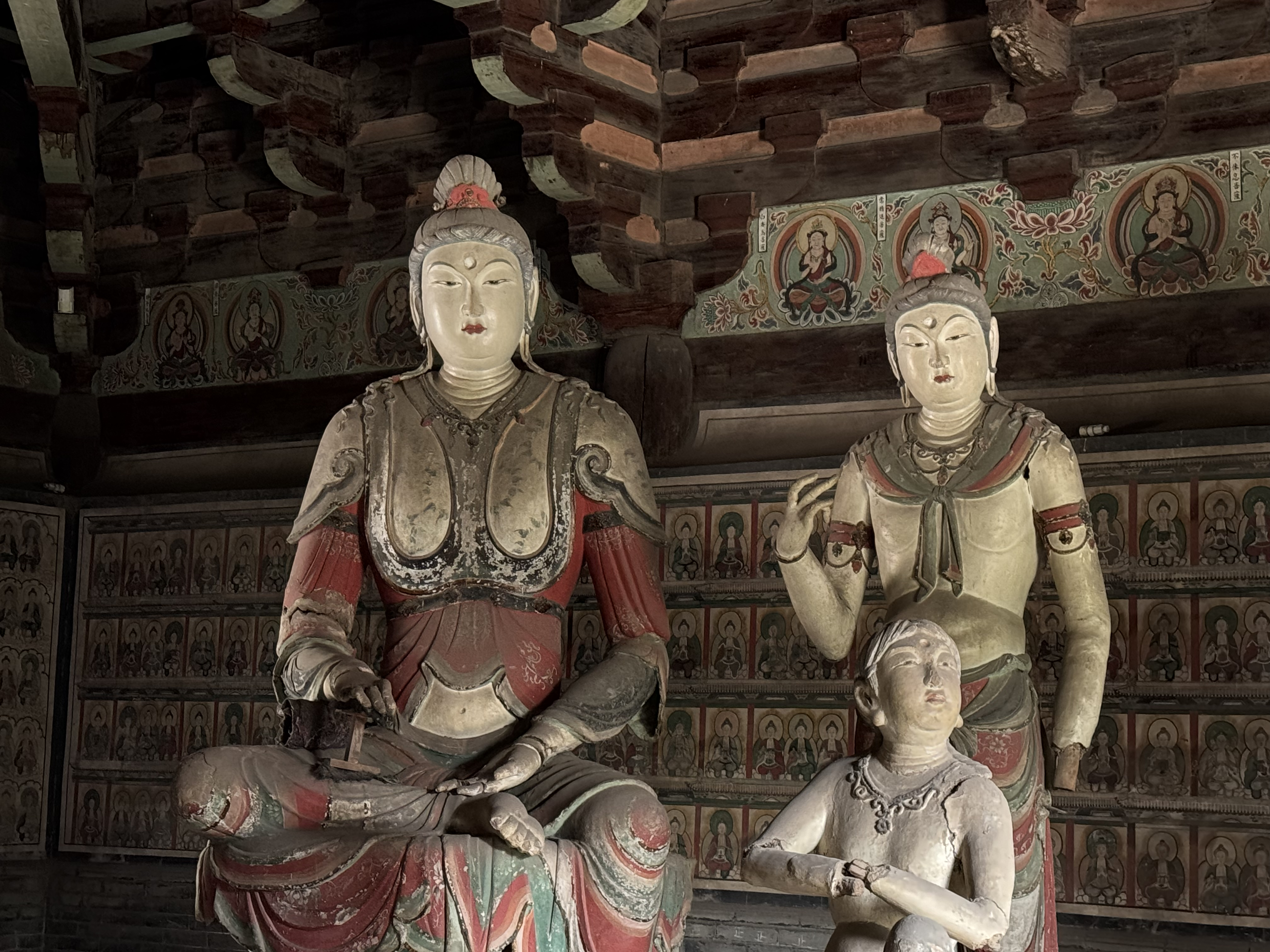

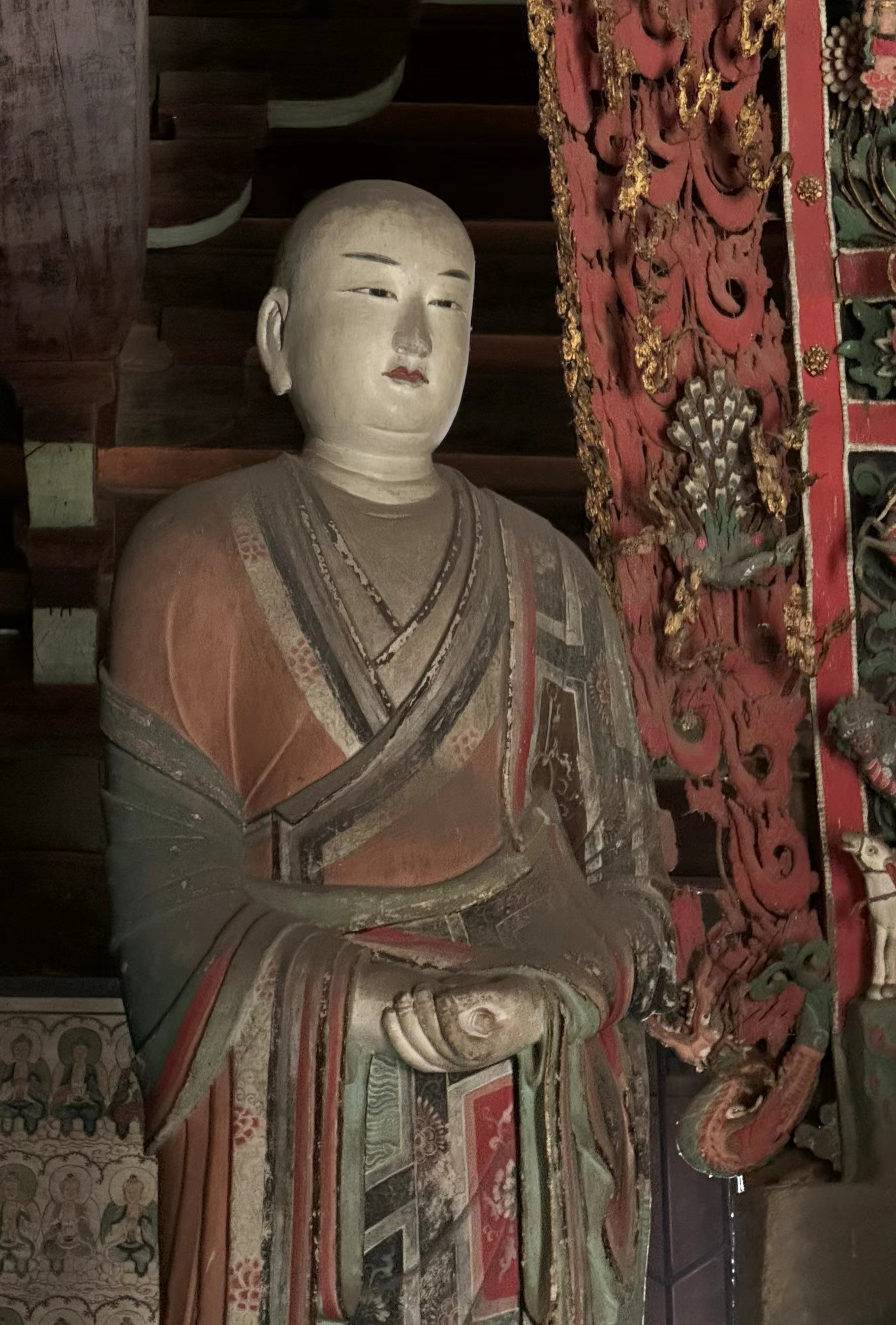

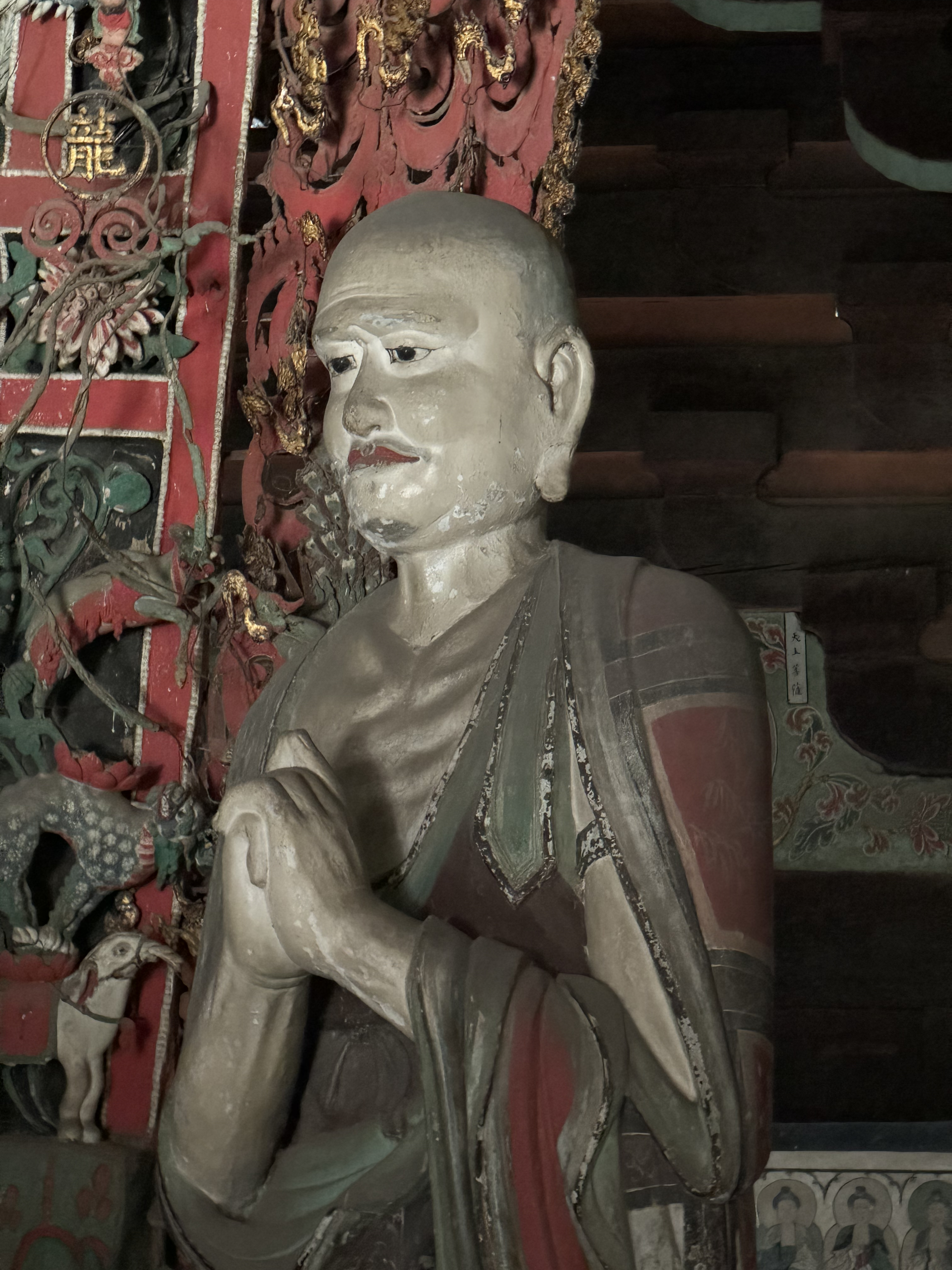

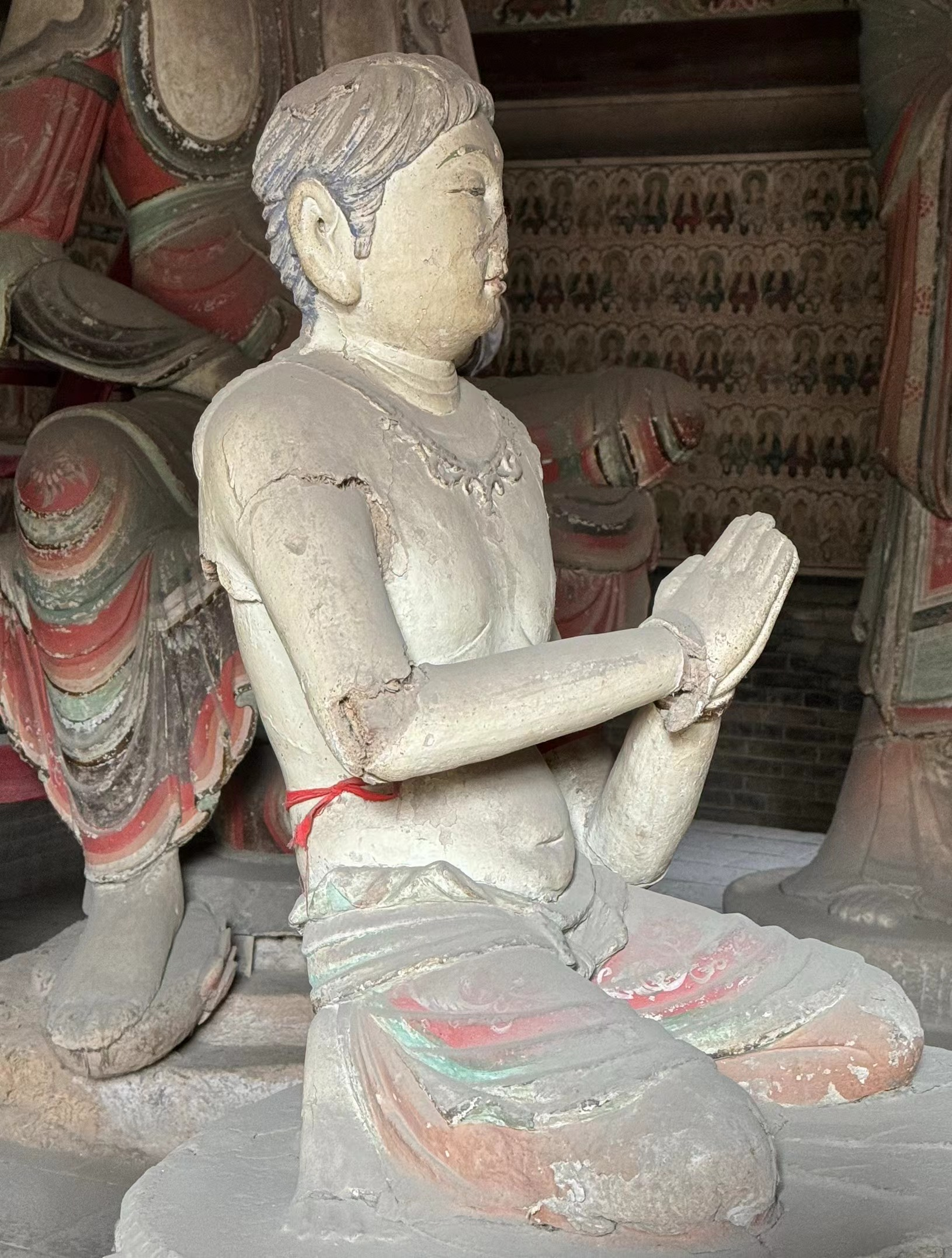

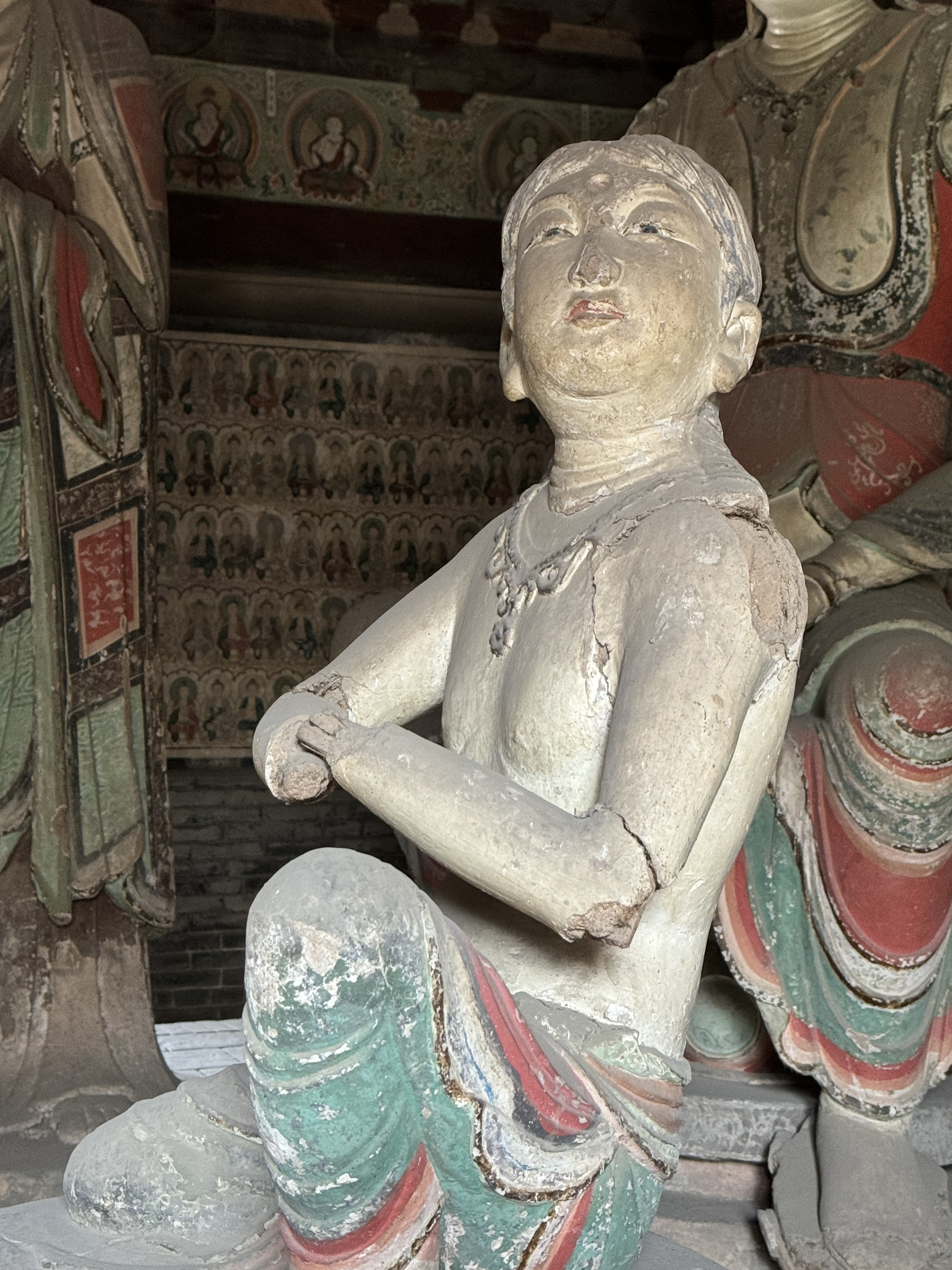

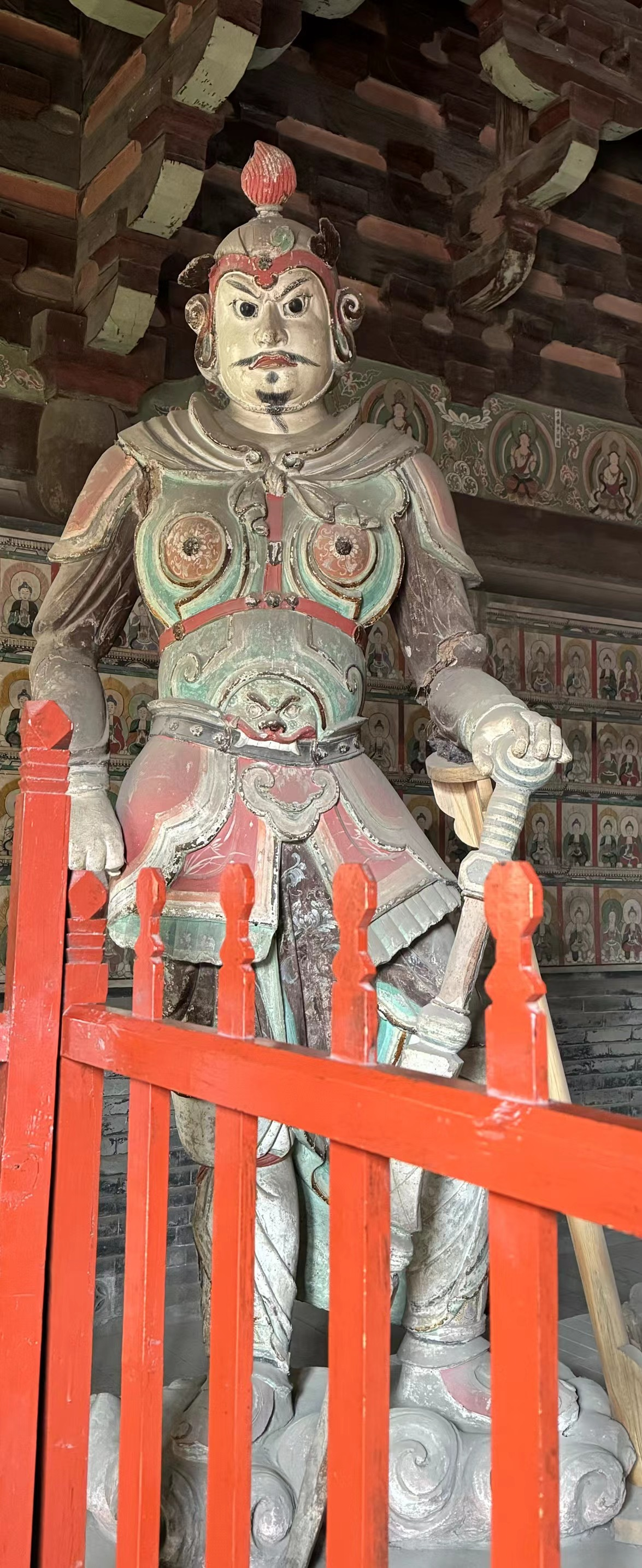

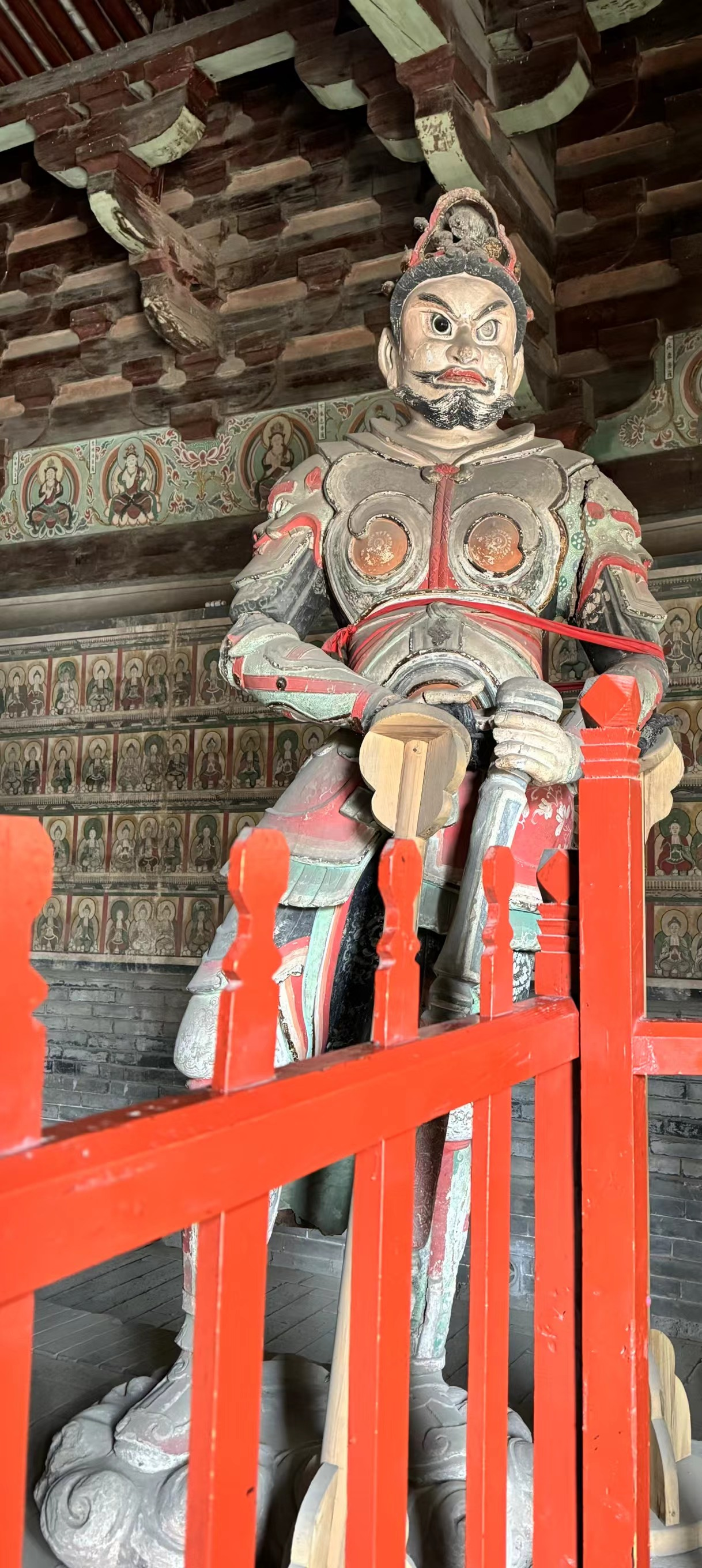
