= Shuanglin Temple =

Buddhist temple in Shanxi, China

- 雙林寺
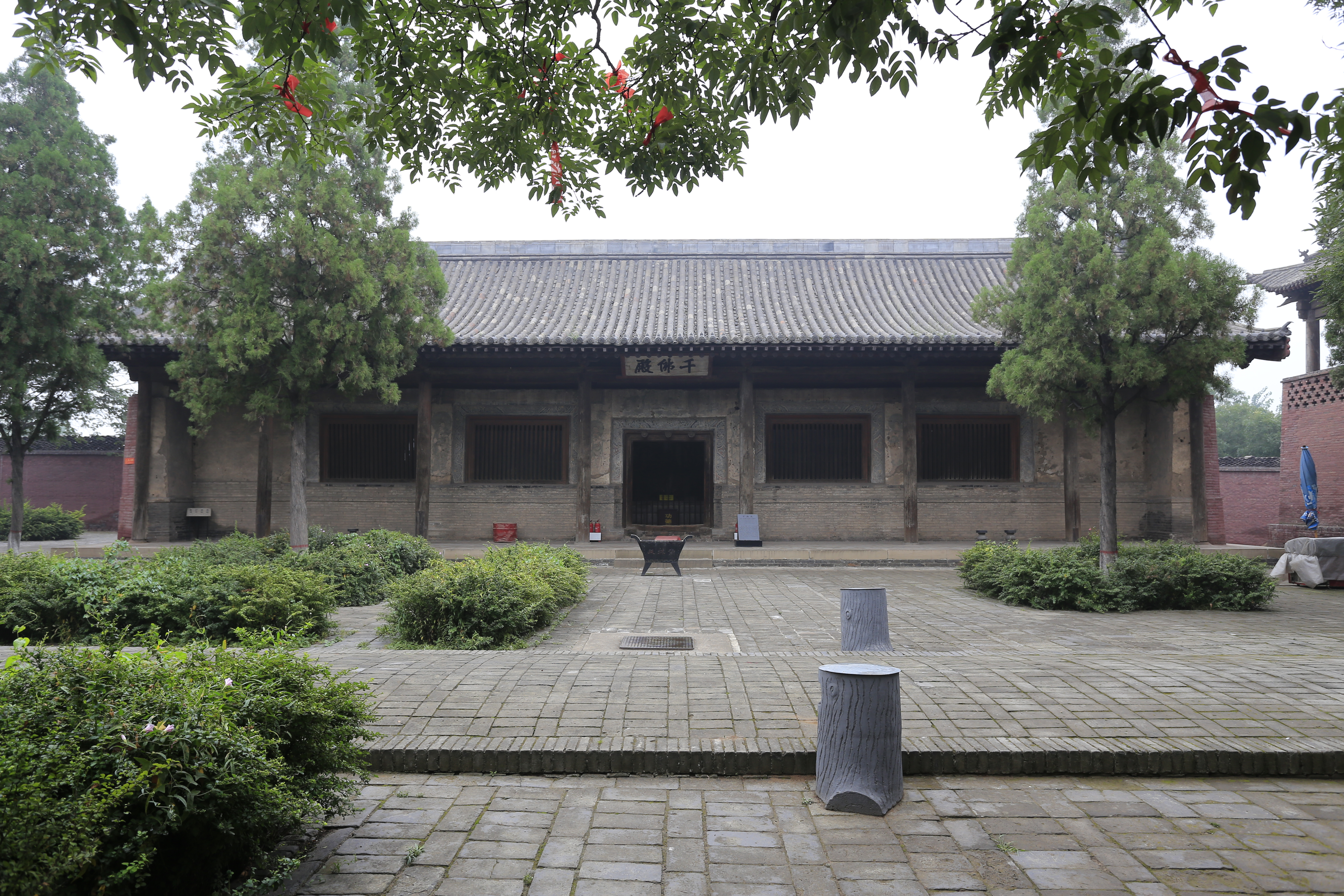

- Location of Shuanglin Temple

Religion
- Affiliation: Buddhism
- Province: Shanxi

Location
- Location: Pingyao
- Coordinates: 37.1708°N 112.125°E

Architecture
- Completed: 6th century (Northern Qi dynasty)

The Shuanglin Temple (Chinese: 双林寺; Chinese: 雙林寺; pinyin: Shuānglín Sì) is a large Buddhist temple in the Shanxi Province of China. It is situated in the countryside of Qiaotou village about 6–7 kilometres (3.7–4.3 mi) southwest of the ancient city of Pingyao. Together with Zhenguo Temple and the ancient walled city, Shuanglin Temple is one of the three components of the 'Ancient City of Pingyao' UNESCO World Heritage Site, inscribed in 1997.

Founded in the 6th century, the temple is notable for its collection of more than 2,000 decorated clay statues that are dated to the 12th–19th centuries. Its original name was Zongdu but it was renamed during the Northern Song dynasty period as Shuanglin. It is nicknamed the museum of coloured sculptures. Most of them are dated to the period of the Song, Yuan, Ming and Qing dynasties.

== History ==
The Buddhist temple was founded in 571 A.D. during the second year of the Wuping period of the Northern Qi dynasty. However, the extant buildings date to the Ming and Qing dynasties. It is notable for its collection of over two thousand decorated clay statues dating from the 12th–19th centuries. Many of the statues were stolen or damaged during the Cultural Revolution. It is one of the five sites identified in the city's preservation area of cultural relics which has undergone several renovations. In Pingyao's tortoise-shaped city plan, which is characterized by many coloured art sculptures, the Shuanglin Temple is rated as the city's third treasure.

== Geography ==
The Shuanglin Temple is located some six to seven kilometers away from Pingyao, in Qiatou village's countryside.

== Layout ==
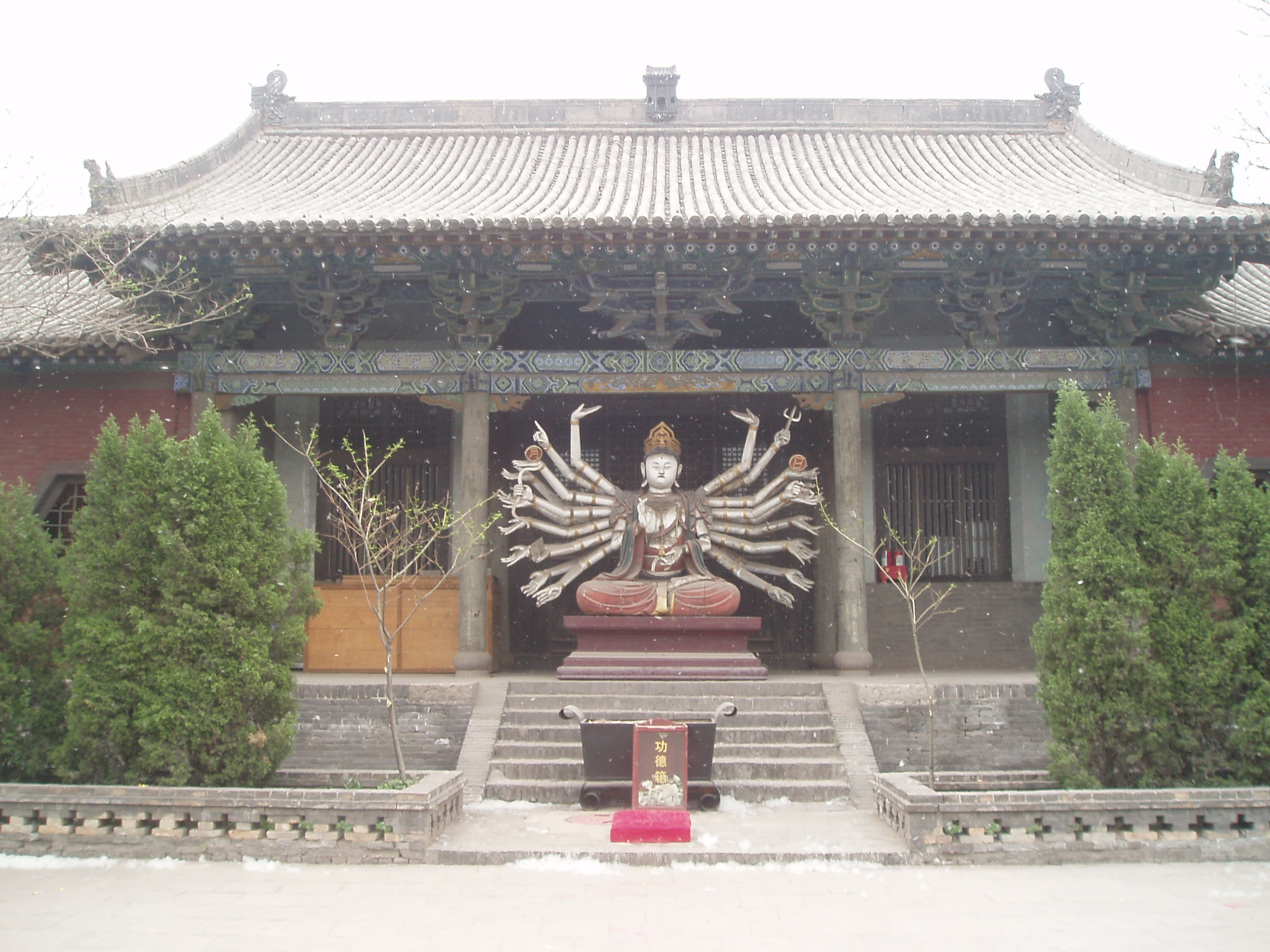
Entrance of Bodhisattva Hall

The sculpted figures are displayed in a very systematic manner, in ten halls. The temple complex appears like a fortress as it has a high compound wall with a gate. The ten halls are arranged within three courtyards.

== Features ==
The temple is noted for its colourful sculptures, lifelike in form, which were patterned on the design of the artistic traditions of the Song, Jin and Yuan periods. The themes depicted are generally religious in nature and relate to the daily life of people. They are considered among the finest examples of Chinese coloured sculptures. The number of coloured sculptures are reported to be 2,052, out of which 1,650 are reported to be extant. The height of the sculptures varies between 0.3–3.5 metres (1 ft 0 in – 11 ft 6 in). The formats are of bas-relief, high relief and in circular form. There are also wall sculptures and a few are suspended. Buddha, Bodhisattva, Warrior Guards, Arhat, heavenly generals and also common people are the sculptural themes. The background scenes depict towers, buildings, mountains, rivers, clouds, rocks, grasses, flowers, forested trees, and woodlands. The sculptures are displayed behind caged chambers in a tableaux form. There is also statue of husband and wife who took care of this shrine during the Chinese Civil War. The setting of the scene behind the statues is that of flowing water cascades or clouds, and as result the wooden halls appear like grottoes. Maintenance is reported to be poor as many statues are seen in a bad condition for lack of preservation. The temple's external surface is covered with coal dust and looks musty.

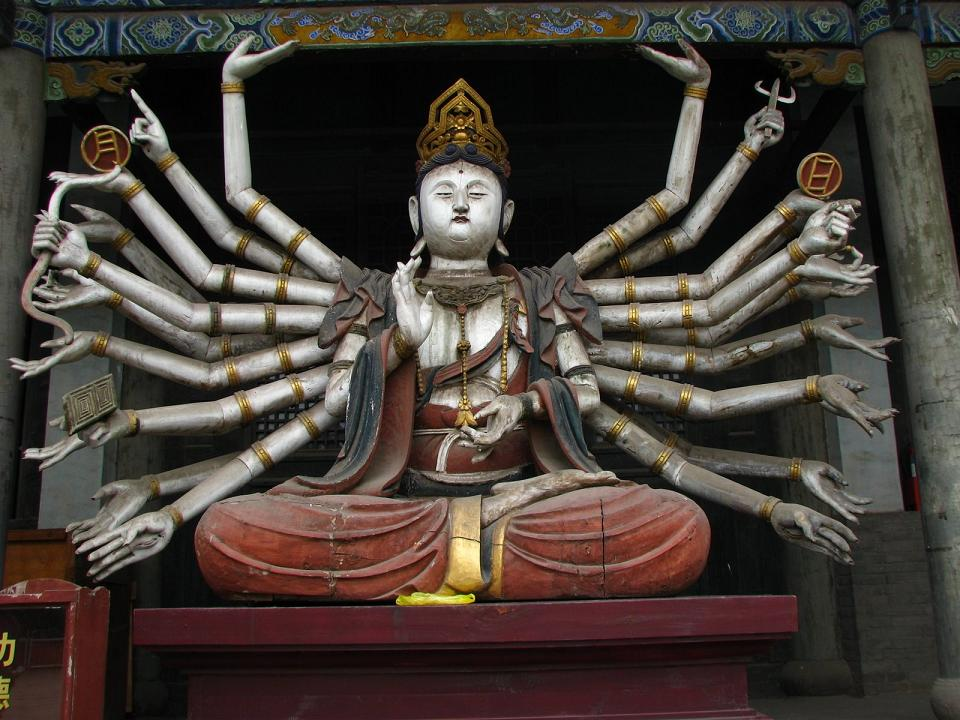
Bodhisattva carved with several arms

=== Hall of the Devas ===
Sculptures of Vajrapani and the Four Heavenly Kings are displayed in the Hall of the Devas.

=== Arhat Hall ===
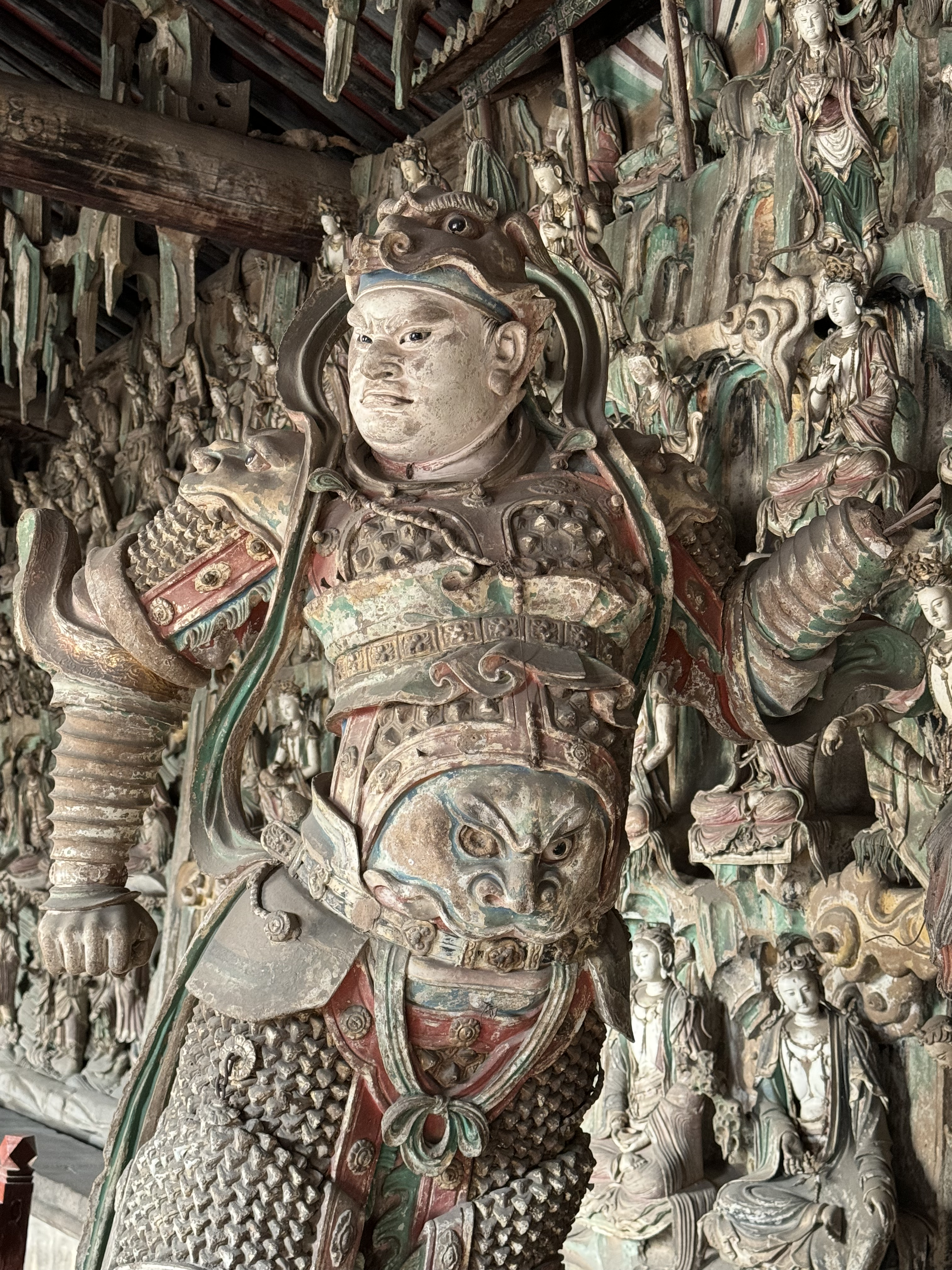
Statue of Skanda（韦驮像）

Eighteen sculptresses are in the Arhat hall (Luohan Ting; Chinese: 罗汉厅). These are sculpted as noble figures with amicable facial expressions. The garments are similar to the Cao Jiaxiang's style and have received wide acclaim. The carved garments are tight fitting shirts over loose robes with broad sleeves. The most striking figure among the sculptures in the Arhat hall is that of the holy Guanyin style of sculpting which was popular during the later period of Chinese Buddhism. The gilded sculpted image of Bodhisattva of this period is shown in a cross-legged pose seated on a lotus. A Sumeru throne is sculpted below this image and is fixed over figures of mighty men. The statue is carved in a halo.

=== Hall of a Thousand Buddhas ===
This hall enshrines a statue of the dharmapala Weituo, which are considered masterpieces of sculptural art of the Buddhist culture of the Ming dynasty period. The hall has sculpted feminine figurines in a sitting posture. The chief deity is shown with his legs positioned over a coiled dragon.

=== Bodhisattva Hall ===
Bodhisattva Hall, called the Pusa Ting (Chinese: 菩萨厅), has a thousand-armed Guanyin. The ceiling in this hall contains depictions of a guard in the form of three-clawed round and bellied figure, and is painted green. The Bodhisattva hall has the sculpture of a young, attractive looking woman said to represent the Bodhisattva, which is sculpted with many hands. The clothing is very rich and ornaments decorate the Bodhisattva. The twenty or more arms of the Bodhisattva are well-sculpted, of very fair skin, with hands set behind the head and on torso.
