= Royal Ontario Museum =

Museum in Toronto, Ontario, Canada

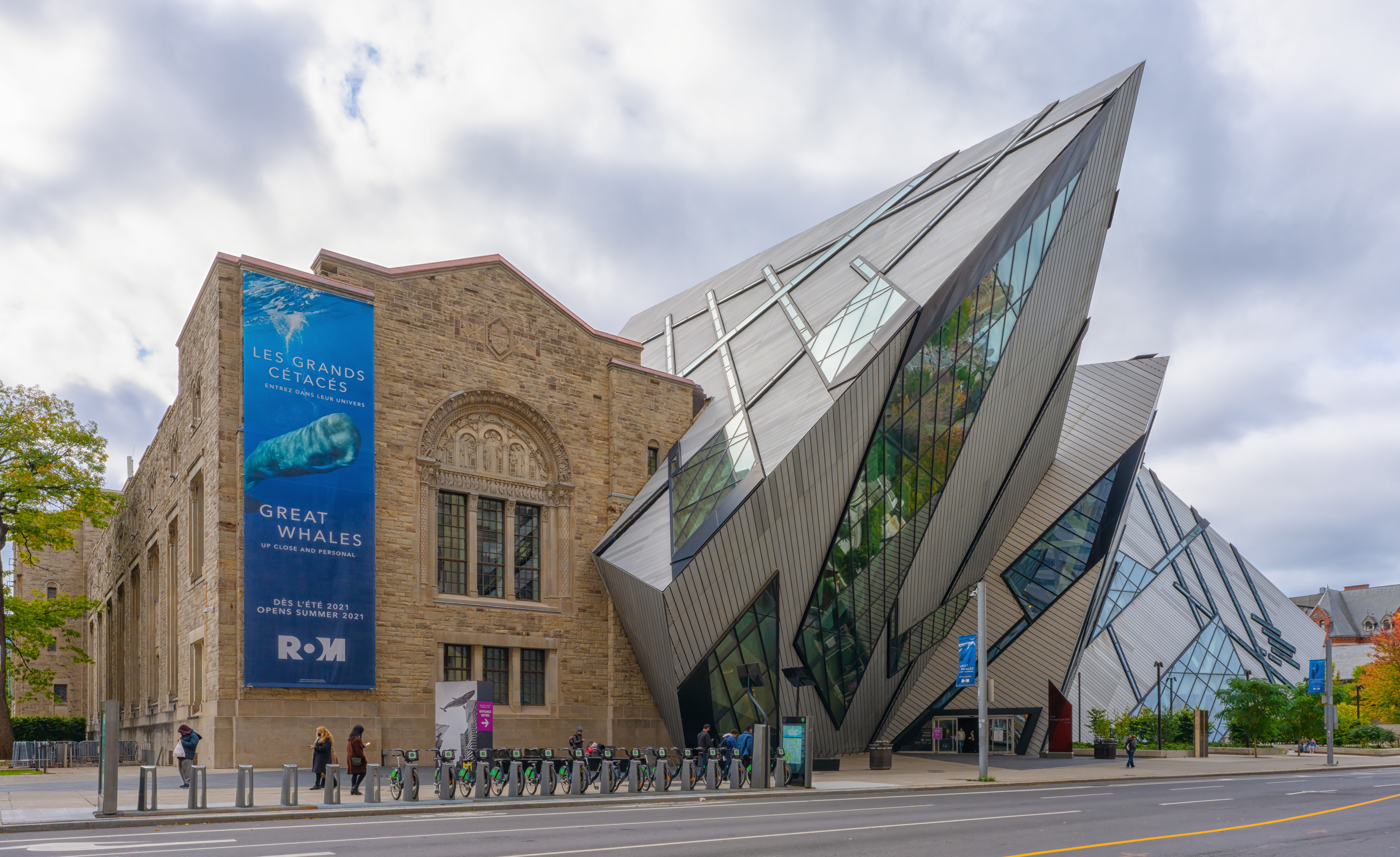
- The museum's exterior in 2021
- Established: 16 April 1912; 114 years ago
- Location: 100 Queen's Park; Toronto, Ontario; M5S 2C6
- Coordinates: 43.667679°N 79.394809°W
- Collection size: 18,000,000+
- Visitors: 1,440,000
- Directors: Yoke Chung & Jennifer Wild
- Owner: Government of Ontario
- Public transit access: Museum
- Website: www.rom.on.ca

History
- Built: 1910–1914, addition: 1931–32

Site notes
- Architect(s): Darling & Pearson, addition: Chapman & Oxley
- Sculptor: Wm. Oosterhoff

Ontario Heritage Act
- Designated: 2003
- Reference no.: Heritage Easement Agreement AT347470

The Royal Ontario Museum (ROM, French: Musée royal de l'Ontario) is a museum of art, world culture and natural history in Toronto, Ontario, Canada. It is one of the largest museums in North America and the largest museum in Canada. It attracts more than one million visitors every year, making it the most-visited museum in Canada. The 74,000-square-metre (800,000-square-foot) museum building is located north of Queen's Park, in the University district, with its main entrance on Bloor Street West. Museum subway station is named after it and, since a 2008 renovation, is decorated to resemble the ROM's collection at the platform level; Museum station's northwestern entrance directly serves the museum.

Established on April 16, 1912, and opened on March 19, 1914, the ROM has maintained close relations with the University of Toronto throughout its history, often sharing expertise and resources. It was under direct control and management of the University of Toronto until 1968, when it became an independent Crown agency of the Government of Ontario. It is Canada's largest field-research institution, with research and conservation activities worldwide.

With more than 18 million items and 40 galleries, the museum's diverse collections of world culture and natural history contribute to its international reputation. It contains a collection of dinosaurs, minerals, and meteorites; Canadian and European historical artifacts; as well as African, Near Eastern, and East Asian art. It houses the world's largest collection of fossils from the Burgess Shale in British Columbia with more than 150,000 specimens. The museum also contains an extensive collection of design and fine art, including clothing, interior, and product design, especially Art Deco.

== History ==
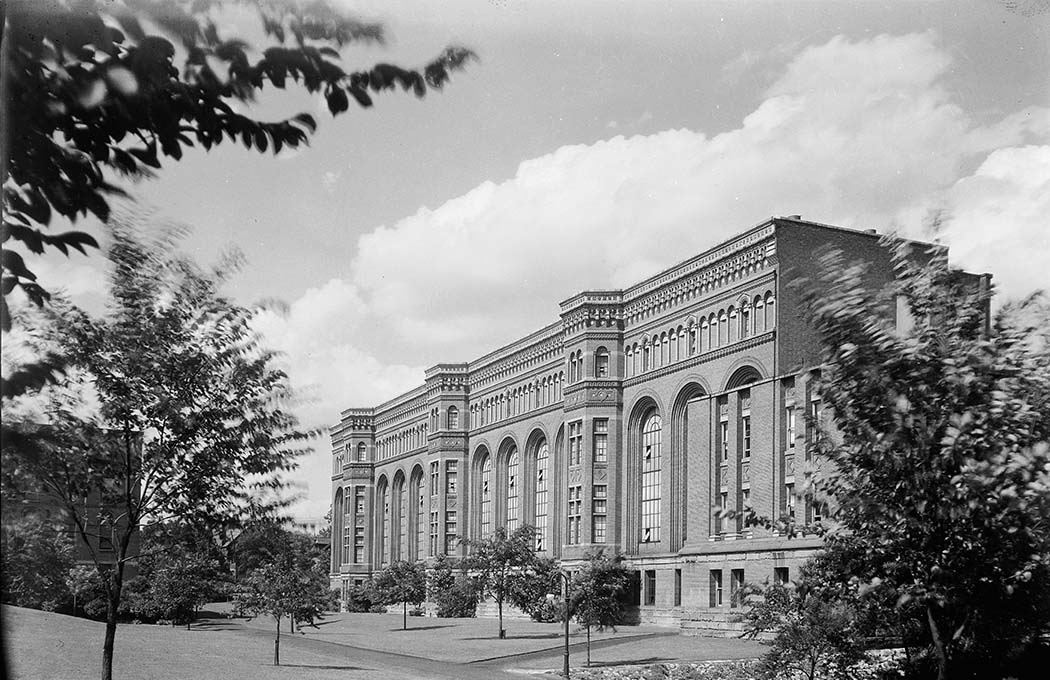
The museum's western façade facing Philosopher's Walk in 1922

The Royal Ontario Museum was formally established on April 16, 1912, and was jointly governed by the Government of Ontario and the University of Toronto. Its first assets were transferred from the university and the Ontario Department of Education, coming from its predecessor, the Museum of Natural History and Fine Arts at the Toronto Normal School. On 19 March 1914, the Duke of Connaught, also the governor general of Canada, officially opened the Royal Ontario Museum to the public. The museum's location at the edge of Toronto's built-up area, far from the city's central business district, was selected mainly for its proximity to the University of Toronto St. George. The original building was constructed on the western edge of the property along the university's Philosopher's Walk, with its main entrance facing out onto Bloor Street housing five separate museums of the following fields: Archaeology, Palaeontology, Mineralogy, Zoology, and Geology. It cost CA$400,000 to construct. This was the first phase of a two-part construction plan intended to expand toward Queen's Park Crescent, ultimately creating an H-shaped structure.

The first expansion to the Royal Ontario Museum publicly opened on October 12, 1933. The CA$1.8-million renovation saw the construction of the east wing fronting onto Queen's Park and required the demolition of Argyle House, a Victorian mansion at 100 Queen's Park. As this occurred during the Great Depression, an effort was made to use primarily local building materials and to make use of workers capable of manually excavating the building's foundations. Teams of workers alternated weeks of service due to the physically draining nature of the job.

In 1947, the ROM was dissolved as a body corporate, with all assets transferred to the University of Toronto. The museum remained part of the University until 1968, when it, along with the newly opened McLaughlin Planetarium, was reincorporated as a single separate entity. The planetarium was named after benefactor Samuel McLaughlin, who provided CA$2 million for its construction.

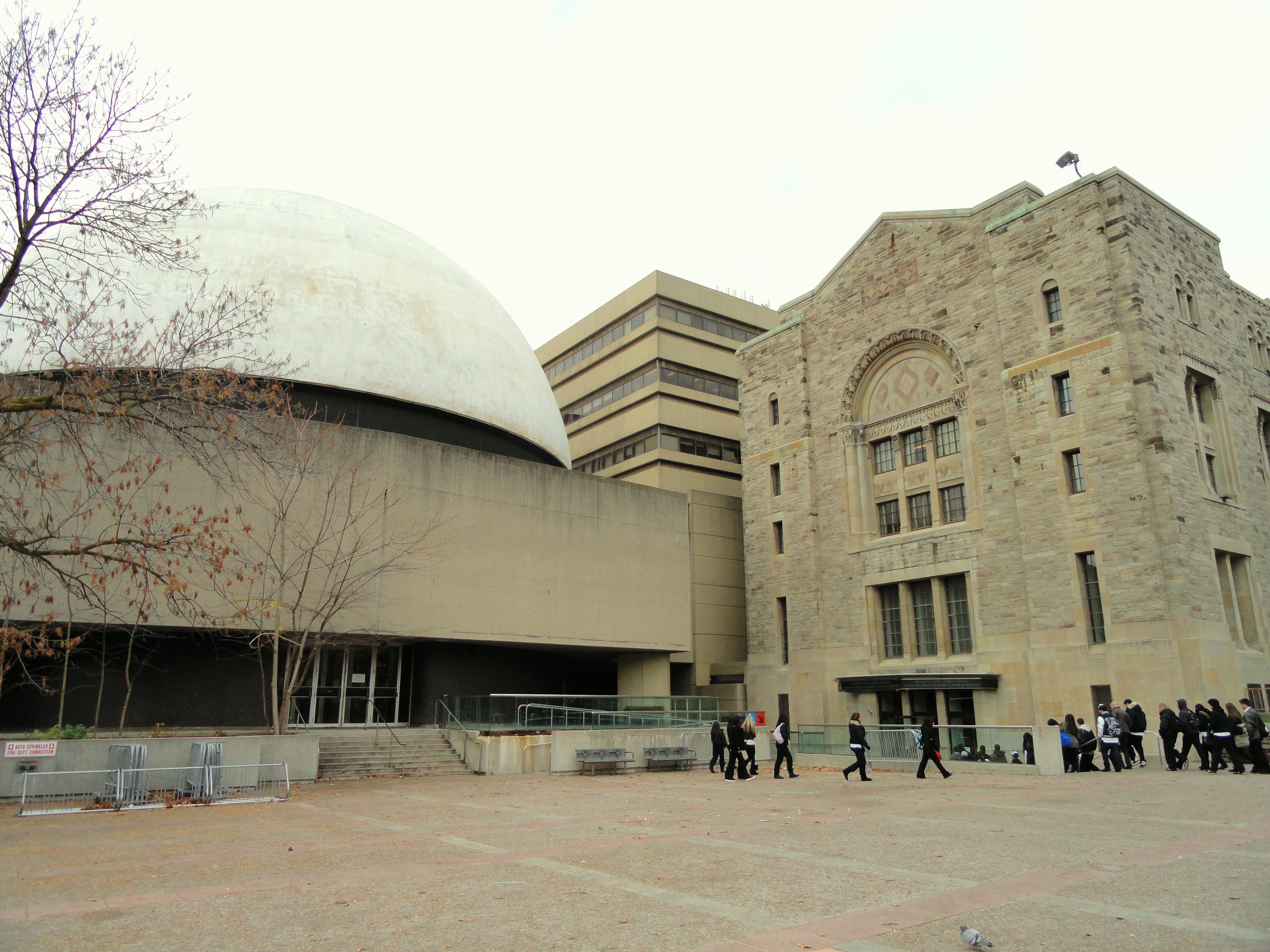
The McLaughlin Planetarium next to the museum. The planetarium was operated by the museum from 1968 to 2009; the structure was demolished in 2026.

The second major addition to the museum was the Queen Elizabeth II Terrace Galleries on the north side of the building and a curatorial centre built on the south, which started in 1978 and was completed in 1984. The new construction meant that a former outdoor "Chinese Garden" to the north of the building facing Bloor, along with an adjoining indoor restaurant, had to be dismantled. Opened in 1984 by Queen Elizabeth II, the CA$55 million expansion took the form of layered terraces, each rising layer stepping back from Bloor Street. The design of this expansion won a Governor-General's Award in Architecture.

In 1989, activists complained about its Into the Heart of Africa exhibit, which featured stereotypes of Africans, forcing curator Jeanne Cannizzo to resign.

In December 1995, ROM closed the McLaughlin Planetarium due to provincial government budget cuts. The space was later leased to the Children's Own Museum from 1998 to 2002, and was eventually sold to the University of Toronto for CA$22 million in 2009.

In early November of 2025, the City of Toronto issued a permit for the demolition of the entire Planetarium except its foundations. In 1995 the University of Toronto had revealed its plans for the building, which would become an addition to the St. George campus. In early spring of 2026 demolition began to happening, following through on this decades old plan. Once complete it will become part of U of T's School of Cities, which will include a brand new recital hall. The building will also have spaces for U of T's Faculty of Arts and Science, Law, and Music.

Beginning in 2002, the museum underwent a major renovation and expansion project dubbed as Renaissance ROM. The Ontario and Canadian governments, both supporters of this venture, contributed $60 million toward the project, and Michael Lee-Chin donated $30 million. The campaign aimed not only to raise annual visitor attendance from 750,000 to between 1.4 and 1.6 million, but also to generate additional funding opportunities to support the museum's research, conservation, galleries and educational public programs. The centrepiece of the project was a deconstructivist crystalline-form structure called the Michael Lee-Chin Crystal. The structure was created by architect Daniel Libeskind, whose design was selected from among 50 finalists in an international competition. The design of the Crystal required the Terrace Galleries to be torn down (the curatorial centre to the south remains). Existing galleries and buildings were also upgraded, along with the installation of multiple new exhibits over a period of months. The first phase of the Renaissance ROM project, the "Ten Renovated Galleries in the Historic Buildings", opened to the public on 26 December 2005. The architectural opening of the Michael Lee-Chin Crystal took place less than 18 months later, on 2 June 2007. The final cost of the project was about CA$270 million.

The museum undertook renovations in 2024, which continues into 2026, which also involves correcting architectural deficiencies to the Crystal while respecting Libeskind's original architectural design. Renovations include an expanded skylight to provide more natural lighting to its atrium, as well as an additional staircase within the atrium and the reconstruction of the entrance plaza to be level to allow for street performances and small reflecting pools.

== Buildings and architecture ==
The museum complex is made up of several components, including the original building completed in 1914, the eastern wing added in 1933, the curatorial centre completed in 1984, and the Michael Lee-Chin Crystal unveiled in 2007. The original building was listed by the City of Toronto on the Municipal Heritage Register on 20 June 1973, designated under Part IV of the Ontario Heritage Act in 2003, with a Heritage Easement on the buildings.

=== Original building and eastern wing ===
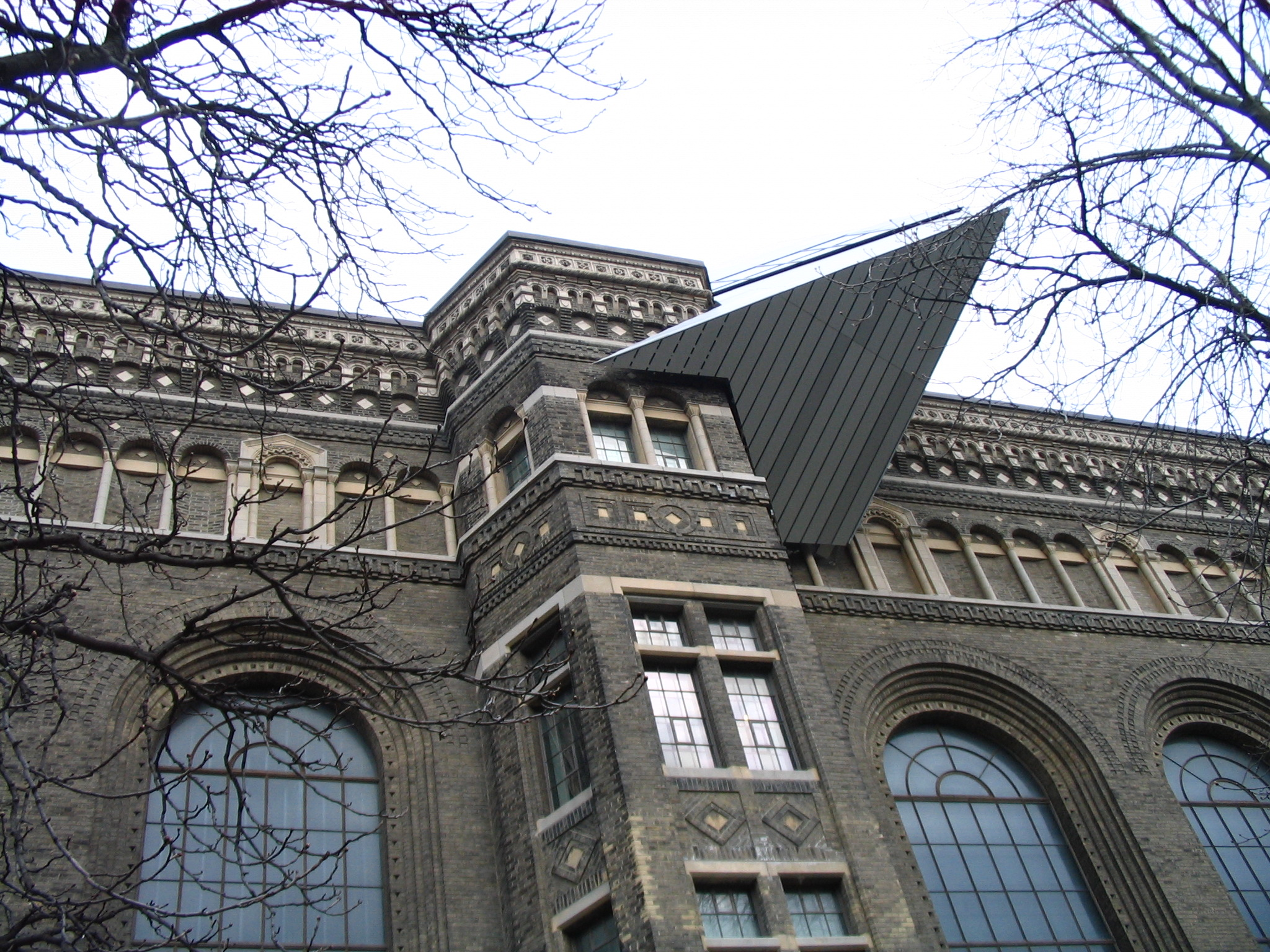
Arched and bay windows along the building's western façade with a very small section of the Crystal jutting out on the top

Designed by Toronto architects Frank Darling and John A. Pearson, the architectural style of the original building (now the western wing) is a synthesis of Italianate and Neo-Romanesque. The structure is heavily massed and punctuated by rounded and segmented arched windows with heavy surrounds and hood mouldings. Other features include applied decorative eave brackets, quoins and cornices.

The mosaic ceiling of the rotunda is covered predominantly in gold back-painted glass tiles with different cultural symbols related to exhibits in the museum in Byzantine style

The eastern wing facing Queen's Park was designed by Alfred H. Chapman and James Oxley. Opened in 1933, it included the museum's elaborate art deco, Byzantine-inspired rotunda and a new main entrance. The linking wing and rear (west) façade of the Queen's Park wing were originally done in the same yellow brick as the 1914 building, with minor Italianate detailing. This façade broke away from the heavy Italianate style of the original structure. It was built in a neo-Byzantine style with rusticated stone, triple windows contained within recessed arches and different-coloured stones arranged in a variety of patterns. This development from the Roman-inspired Italianate to a Byzantine-influenced style reflected the historical development of Byzantine architecture from Roman architecture. Common among neo-Byzantine buildings in North America, the façade also contains elements of Gothic Revival in its relief carvings, gargoyles and statues. The ornate ceiling of the rotunda is covered predominantly in gold back painted glass mosaic tiles, with coloured mosaic geometric patterns and images of real and mythical animals with symbols of the civilizations of the world from the early ages of the Indigenous peoples of the Americas through to the European Middle Ages, the latter seen as the culmination of art when the Byzantine style prevailed.

Writing in the Journal of the Royal Architectural Institute of Canada in 1933, A. S. Mathers said of the expansion:

The interior of the building is a surprise and a pleasant one; the somewhat complicated ornament of the façade is forgotten and a plan on the grand manner unfolds itself. It is simple, direct and big in scale. One is convinced that the early Beaux-Arts training of the designer has not been in vain. The outstanding feature of the interior is the glass mosaic ceiling of the entrance rotunda. It is executed in colours and gold and strikes a fine note in the one part of the building which the architect could decorate without conflicting with the exhibits.

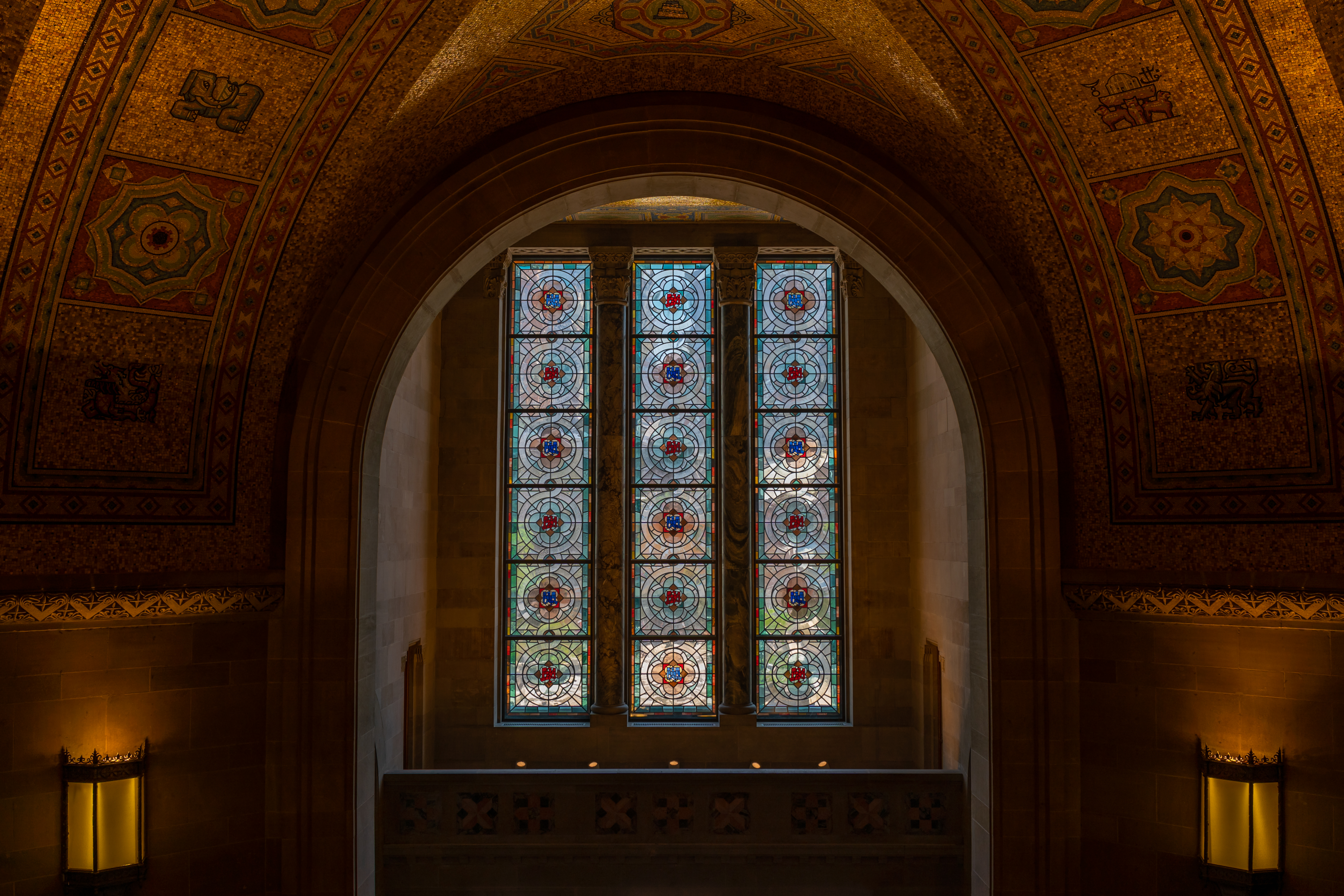
Windows inside the eastern entrance to the museum

The original building and the 1933 expansion have been listed since 1973 as heritage buildings of Toronto. In 2005, a major renovation of the heritage wings saw the galleries made larger, windows uncovered, and the original early 20th-century architecture made more prominent. The exteriors of the heritage buildings were cleaned and restored. The restoration of the 1914 and 1933 buildings was the largest heritage project undertaken in Canada. The renovation also included the newly restored Rotunda with reproductions of the original oak doors, a restored axial view from the Rotunda west through to windows onto Philosophers' Walk and ten renovated galleries comprising a total of 8,000 square metres (90,000 sq ft).

In the master plan designed by Darling and Pearson in 1909, the ROM took a form similar to that of J. N. L. Durand's ideal model of the museum. It was envisioned as a square plan with corridors running through the centre of the composition, converging in the middle with a domed rotunda. Overall, it referenced the upper-class palaces of the 17th and 18th centuries and aimed at having a strong sense of monumentality. All the architectural elements—the deep cornice, decorative top, eave brackets—add to this strength that the ROM possessed, as it was purely a structure with the function of collecting, but not of exhibiting.

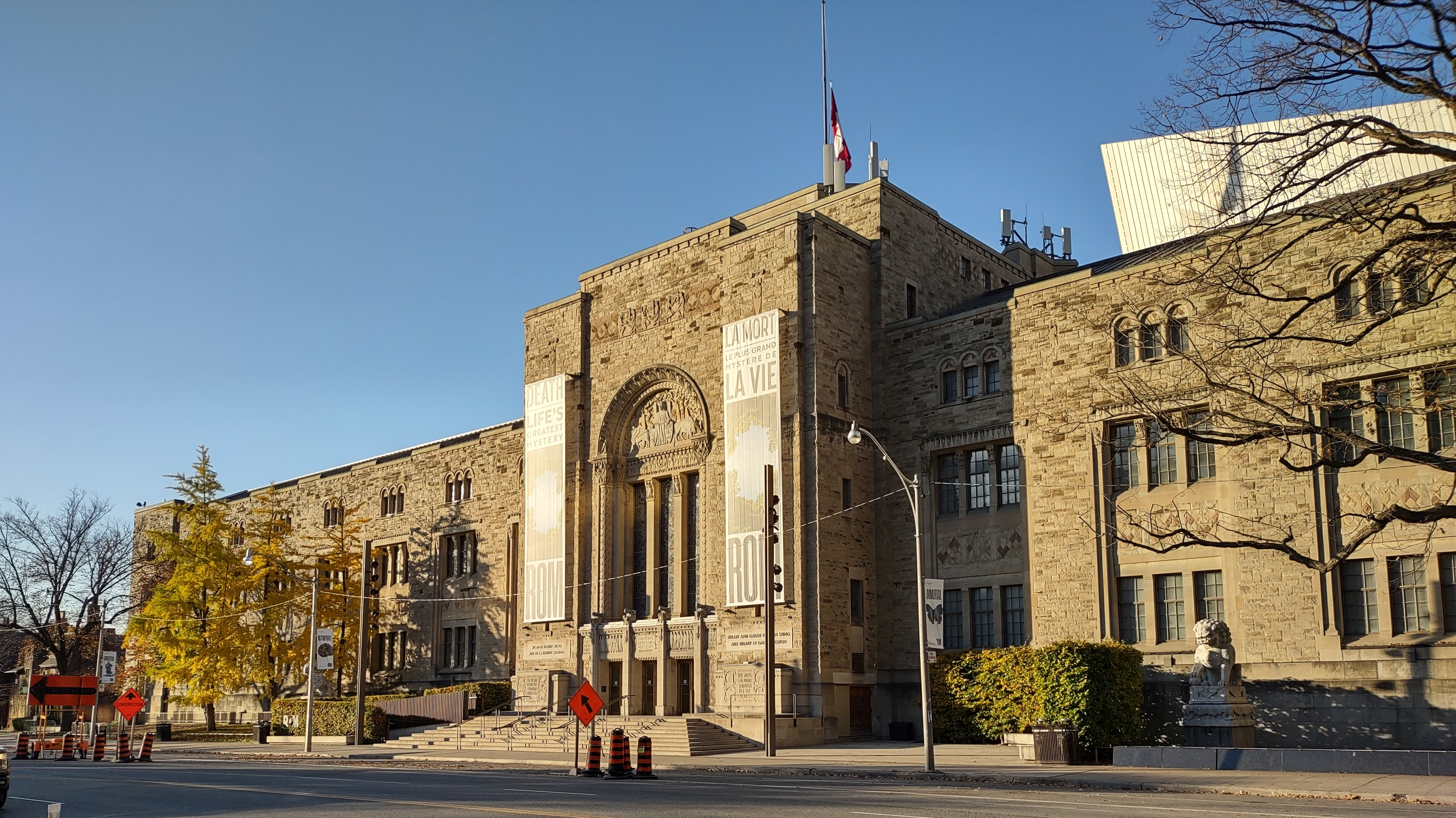
The eastern façade of the 1933 expansion

During the mid-2010s, the eastern entrance was used as a café. Since late 2017, the eastern entrance is undergoing renovation to become an alternate entrance, complete with the addition of ramps to the eastern entrance. The eastern entrance is a few steps from Museum station's northern entrance.

=== Curatorial centre ===
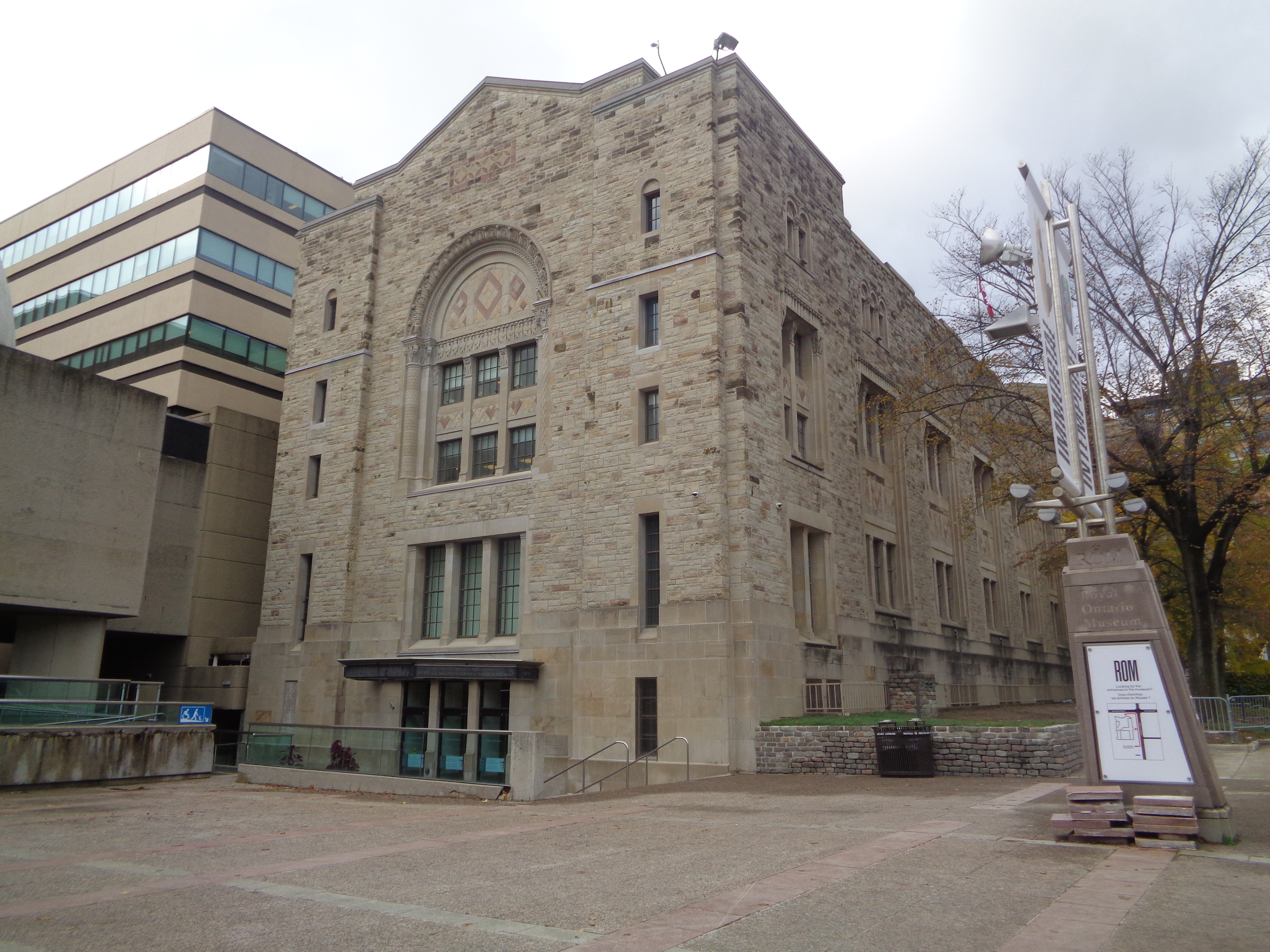
The Royal Ontario Museum from the southeast. The curatorial centre is visible to the west of the 1933 expansion.

Designed by Toronto architect Gene Kinoshita, with Mathers & Haldenby, the curatorial centre forms the southern section of the museum. Completed in 1984, it was built during the same expansion as the former Queen Elizabeth II Terrace Galleries, which stood on the north side of the museum before the terrace galleries were replaced with the Michael Lee-Chin Crystal. The architecture is a simple modernist style of poured concrete, glass, and pre-cast concrete and aggregate panels. The curatorial centre houses the museum's administrative and curatorial services and provides storage for artifacts that are not on exhibit. In 2006, the curatorial centre was renamed to "Louise Hawley Stone Curatorial Centre" in honour of the late Louise Hawley Stone, who donated a number of artifacts and various collections to the museum. In her will, she transferred C$49.7 million to the Louise Hawley Stone Charitable Trust, created to help with the upkeep of the building and to the acquisition of new artifacts.

=== Michael Lee-Chin Crystal ===
Replacing the Queen Elizabeth II Terrace Galleries was the controversial "Michael Lee-Chin Crystal", a multimillion-dollar expansion to the museum designed by Daniel Libeskind, including a new sliding door entrance on Bloor Street, first opened in 2007. The Deconstructivist crystalline form is clad in 25 per cent glass and 75 per cent aluminum, sitting on top of a steel frame. The Crystal's canted walls do not touch the sides of the existing heritage buildings but are used to close the envelope between the new form and existing walls. These walls act as a pathway for pedestrians to travel safely across the Crystal.

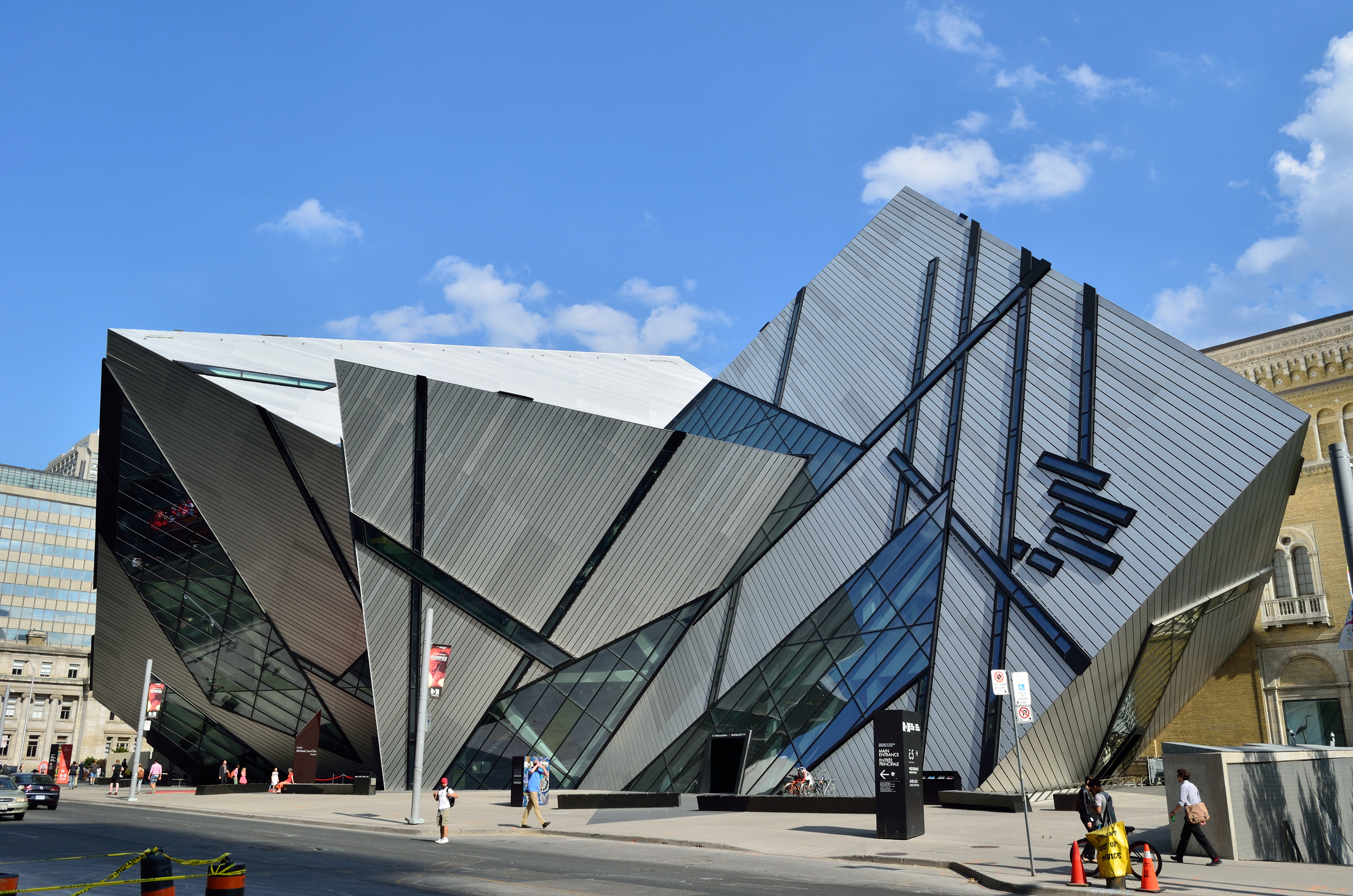
The Michael Lee-Chin Crystal from Bloor Street

The building's design is similar to some of Libeskind's other works, notably the Jewish Museum in Berlin, the London Metropolitan University Graduate Centre and the Fredric C. Hamilton Building at the Denver Art Museum. The steel framework was manufactured and assembled by Walters Inc. of Hamilton, Ontario. The extruded anodized aluminum cladding was fabricated by Josef Gartner in Germany, the only company in the world that can produce the material. The company also provided the titanium cladding for Frank Gehry's Guggenheim Museum in Bilbao, Spain.

On 1 June 2007, the governor-general of Canada, Michaëlle Jean, attended the Crystal's architectural opening. This caused controversy because public opinion had been divided concerning the merits of its angular design. On its opening, Globe and Mail architecture critic Lisa Rochon complained that "the new ROM rages at the world", was oppressive, angsty and hellish, while others—perhaps championed by her Toronto Star counterpart, Christopher Hume—hailed it as a monument. Some critics have ranked it as one of the ten ugliest buildings in the world. The project also experienced budget and construction time over-runs, and drew comparisons to the Guggenheim Museum Bilbao for using so-called "starchitecture" to attract tourism.

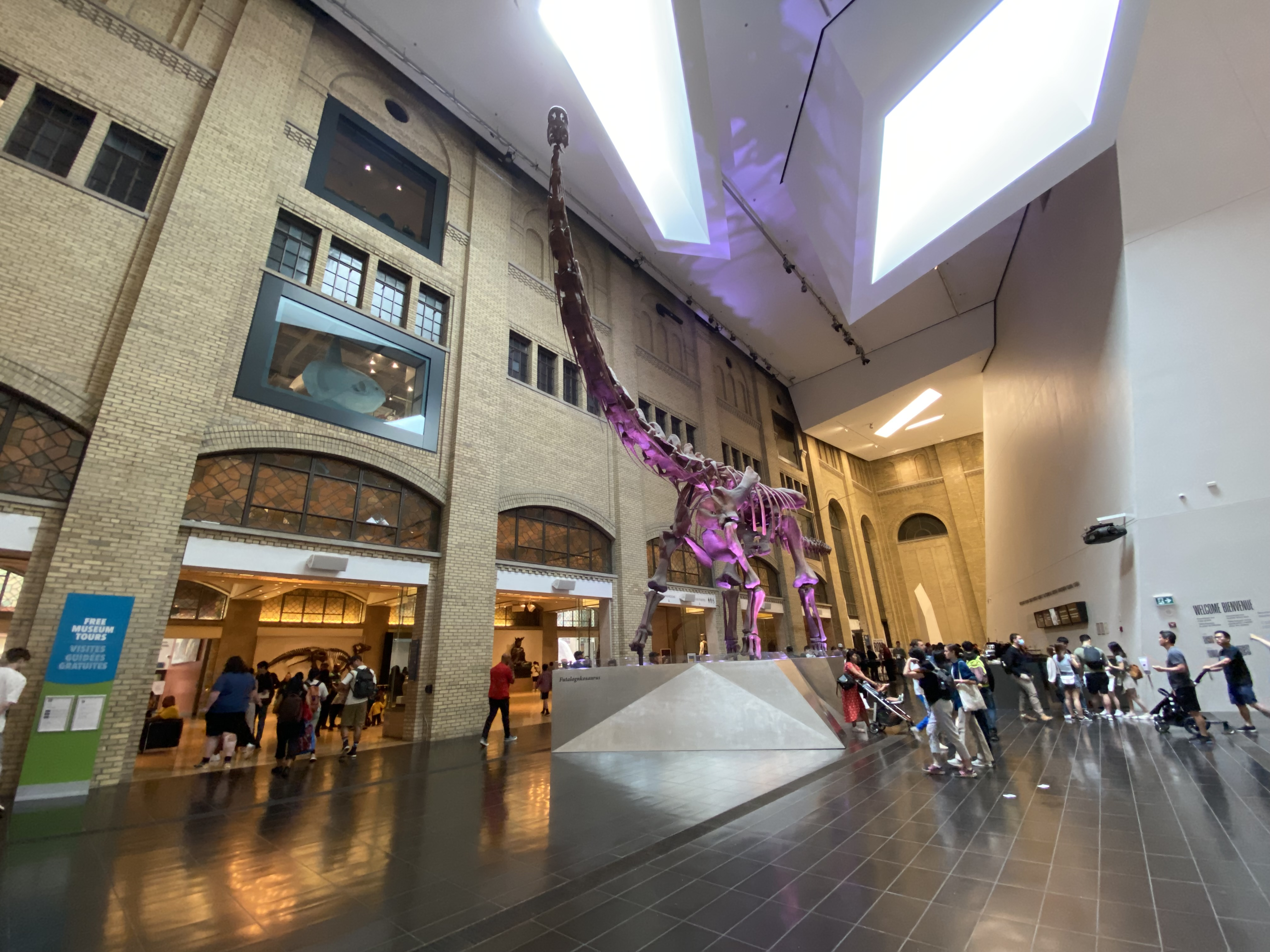
A replica skeleton of Futalognkosaurus inside the Hyacinth Gloria Chen Crystal Court

The main lobby is a three-storey high atrium, named the Hyacinth Gloria Chen Crystal Court. The lobby is overlooked by balconies and flanked by the J. P. Driscoll Family Stair of Wonders and the Spirit House, an interstitial space formed by the intersection of the east and west crystals.

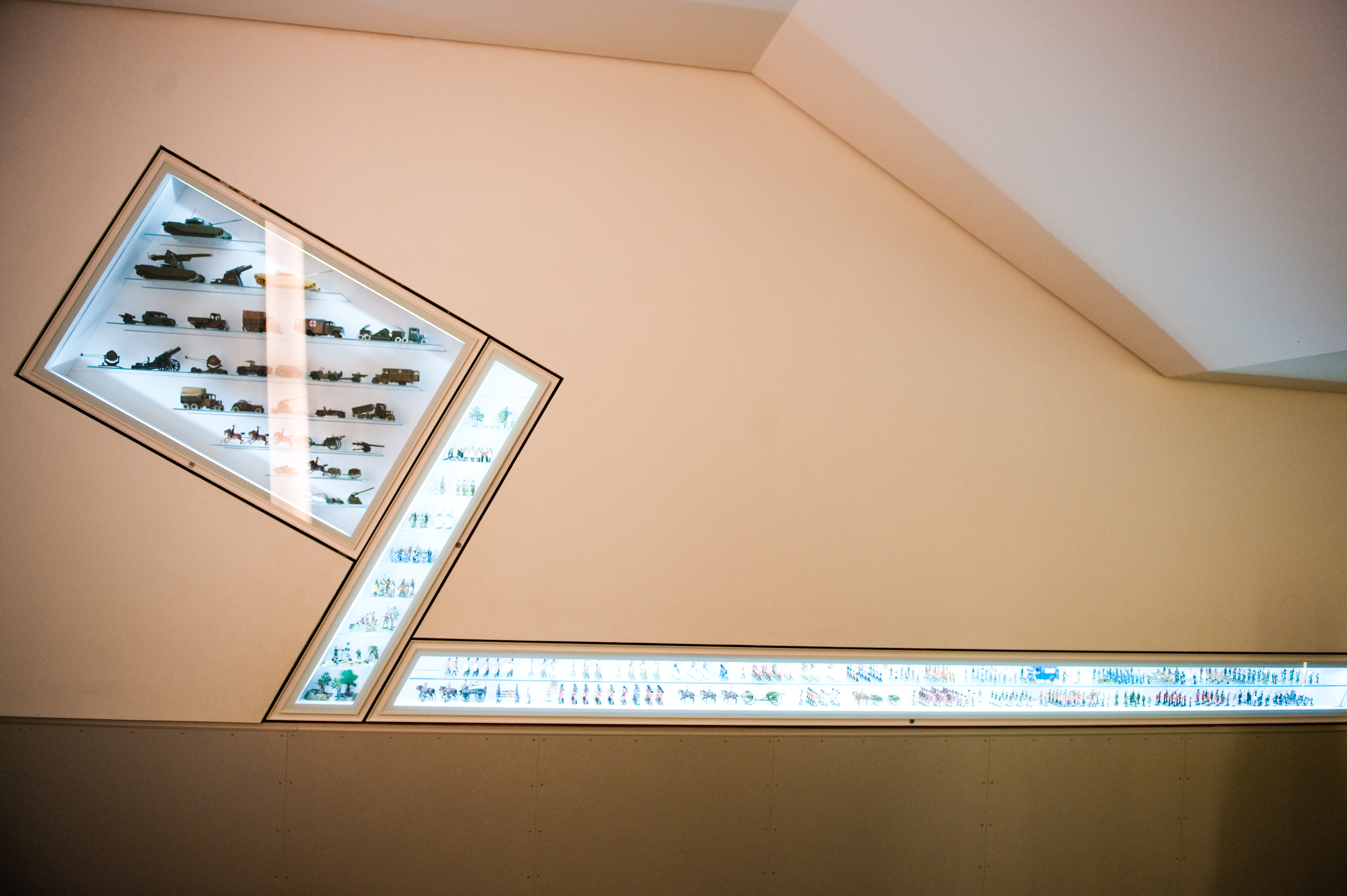
Figurines on display in a vitrine built into the Michael Lee-Chin Crystal

Installation of the permanent galleries of the Lee-Chin Crystal began mid-June 2007, after a ten-day period when all the empty gallery spaces were open to the public. Within the Crystal there is a gift shop, C5 restaurant lounge (closed until further notice), a cafeteria, seven additional galleries and Canada's largest temporary exhibition hall in a museum. The galleries added to the Crystal gave different aspects to the ROM: fascinating visuals, architectural artifacts and environment, art, correspondence between object and space and stories within the visuals. The C5 restaurant Lounge is designed by IV Design Associated Inc.

In October 2007, the Lee-Chin Crystal was reported to have suffered from significant water leakage, causing concerns for the building's resilience to weather, especially in the face of the new structure's proximate first winter. Although a two-layer cladding system was incorporated into the design of the Crystal to prevent the formation of dangerous snow loads on the structure; past architectural creations of Daniel Libeskind (including the Denver Art Museum) have also suffered from weather-related complications.

=== Offsite storage ===
Collections at the ROM not displayed at the ROM itself or in other museums are stored in various unclassified and offsite locations around the Greater Toronto Area, including a facility containing over 1.5 million preserved fish specimens.

== Galleries ==
Originally, there were five major galleries at the ROM, one each for the fields of archaeology, geology, mineralogy, palaeontology and zoology. In general, the museum pieces were labelled and arranged in a static fashion that had changed little since Edwardian times. For example, the insect exhibit that lasted up until the 1970s housed a variety of specimens from different parts of the world in long rows of glass cases. Insects of the same genus were pinned to the inside of the cabinet, with only the species name and location found as a description.

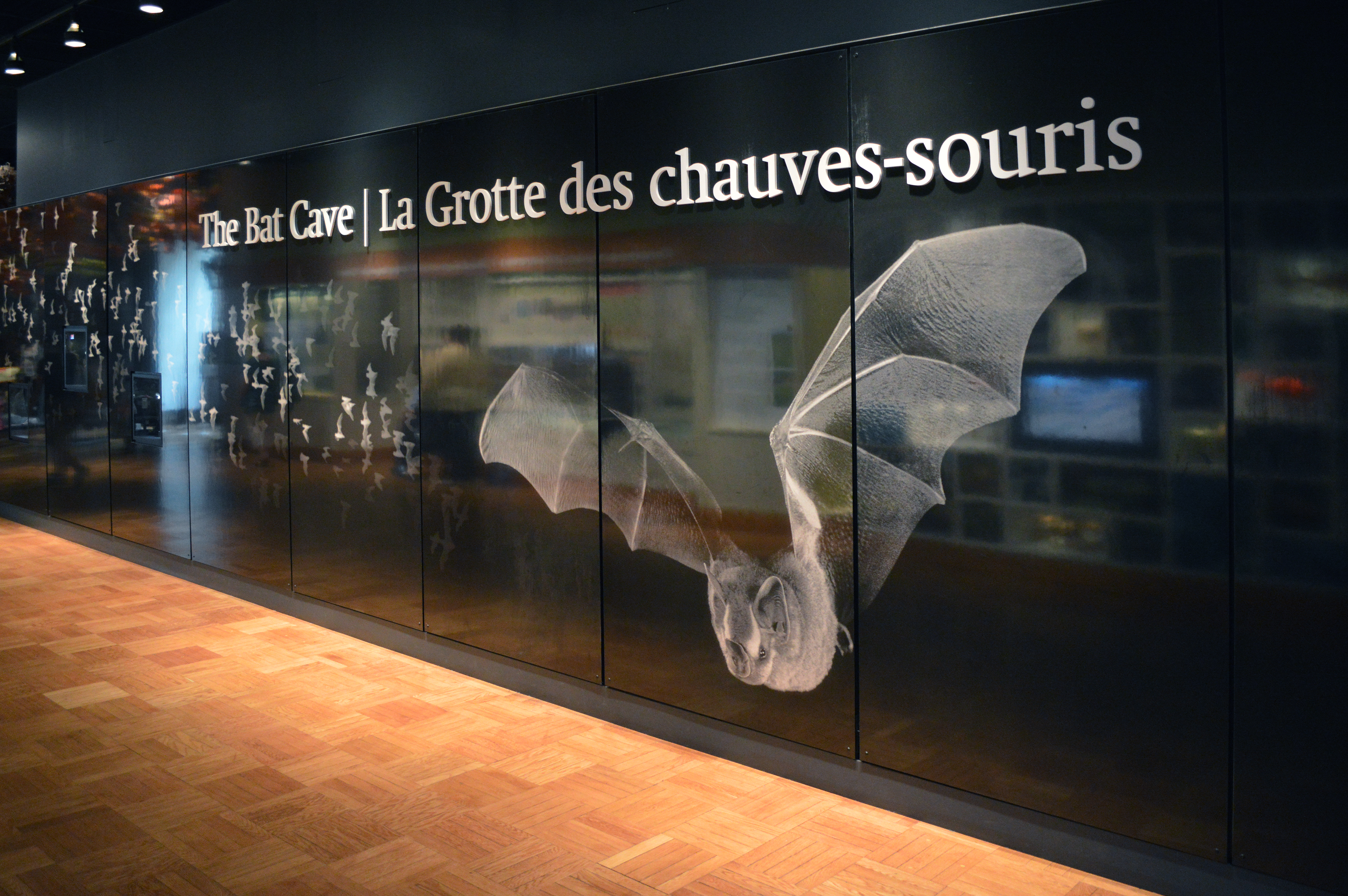
The entrance to the Royal Ontario Museum Bat Cave, an interactive gallery at the museum

By the 1960s, more interpretive displays were ushered in, among the first of which was the original dinosaur gallery, established in the mid-1960s. Dinosaur fossils were now staged in dynamic poses against backdrop paintings and models of contemporaneous landscapes and vegetation. The displays became more descriptive and interpretive sometimes, as with the extinction of the woolly mammoth, offering several different leading theories on the issue for the visitor to ponder. This trend continued and up until the present day, the galleries became less staid and more dynamic or descriptive and interpretive. This trend arguably came to a culmination in the 1980s with the opening of The Bat Cave, where a sound system, strobe lights and gentle puffs of air attempt to recreate the experience of walking through a cave as a colony of bats fly out.

The original galleries were simply named after their subject material, but in more recent years, individual galleries have been named in honour of sponsors who have donated significant funds or collections to the institution. There are now two main categories of galleries present in the ROM: the Natural History Galleries and the World Culture Galleries.

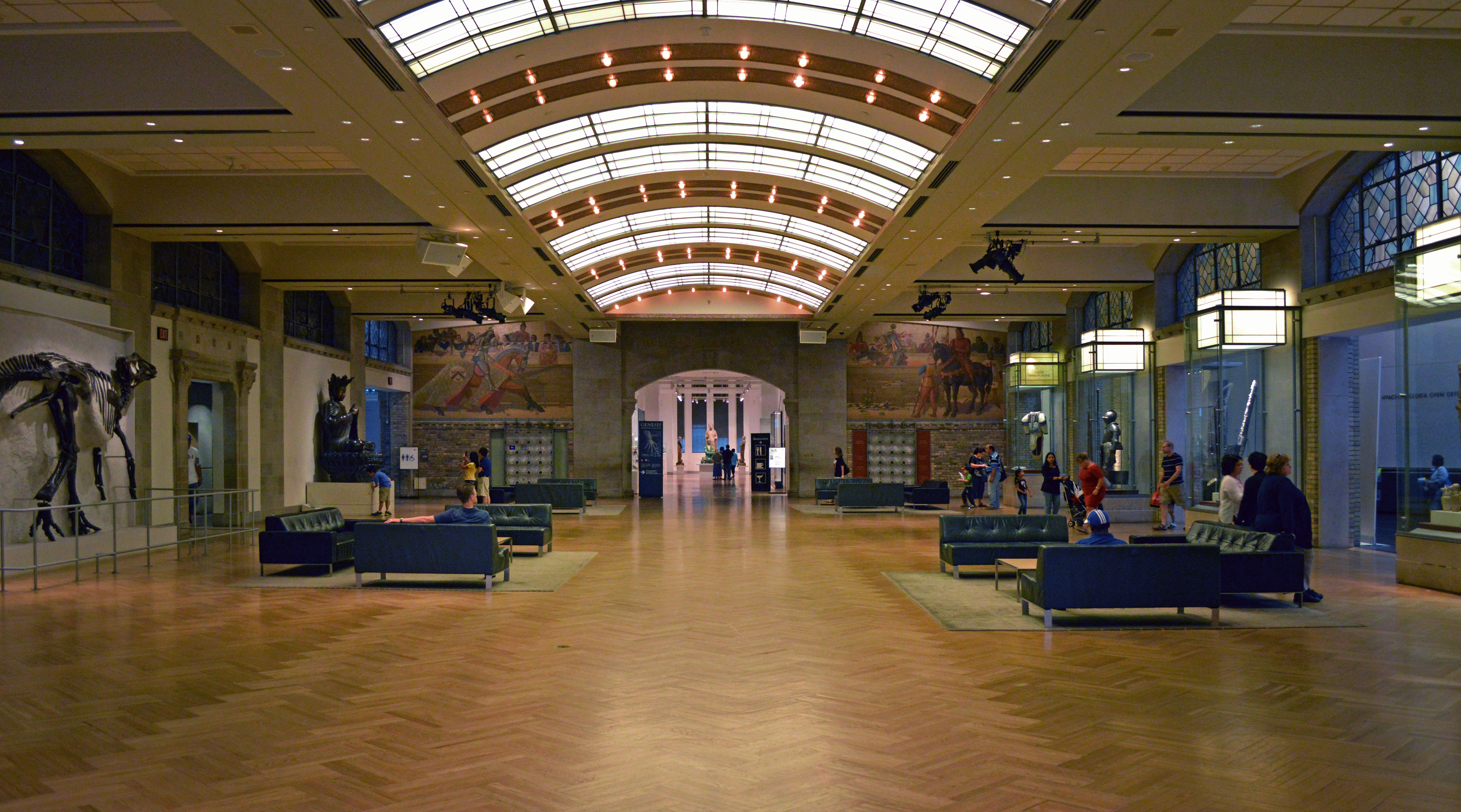
The museum's lobby, the Samuel Hall Currelly Gallery, houses several items from the museum's collection.

The Samuel Hall Currelly Gallery is an exhibition space on Level 1, connecting the east wing of the museum with its western half. The gallery serves as the building's main lobby past the museum's admission area. As opposed to most galleries at the Royal Ontario Museum, the Samuel Hall Currelly Gallery is not dedicated to a single subject. Instead, the gallery exhibits an assortment of items from the museum's collection representing them as a whole.

=== Costumes and textiles ===
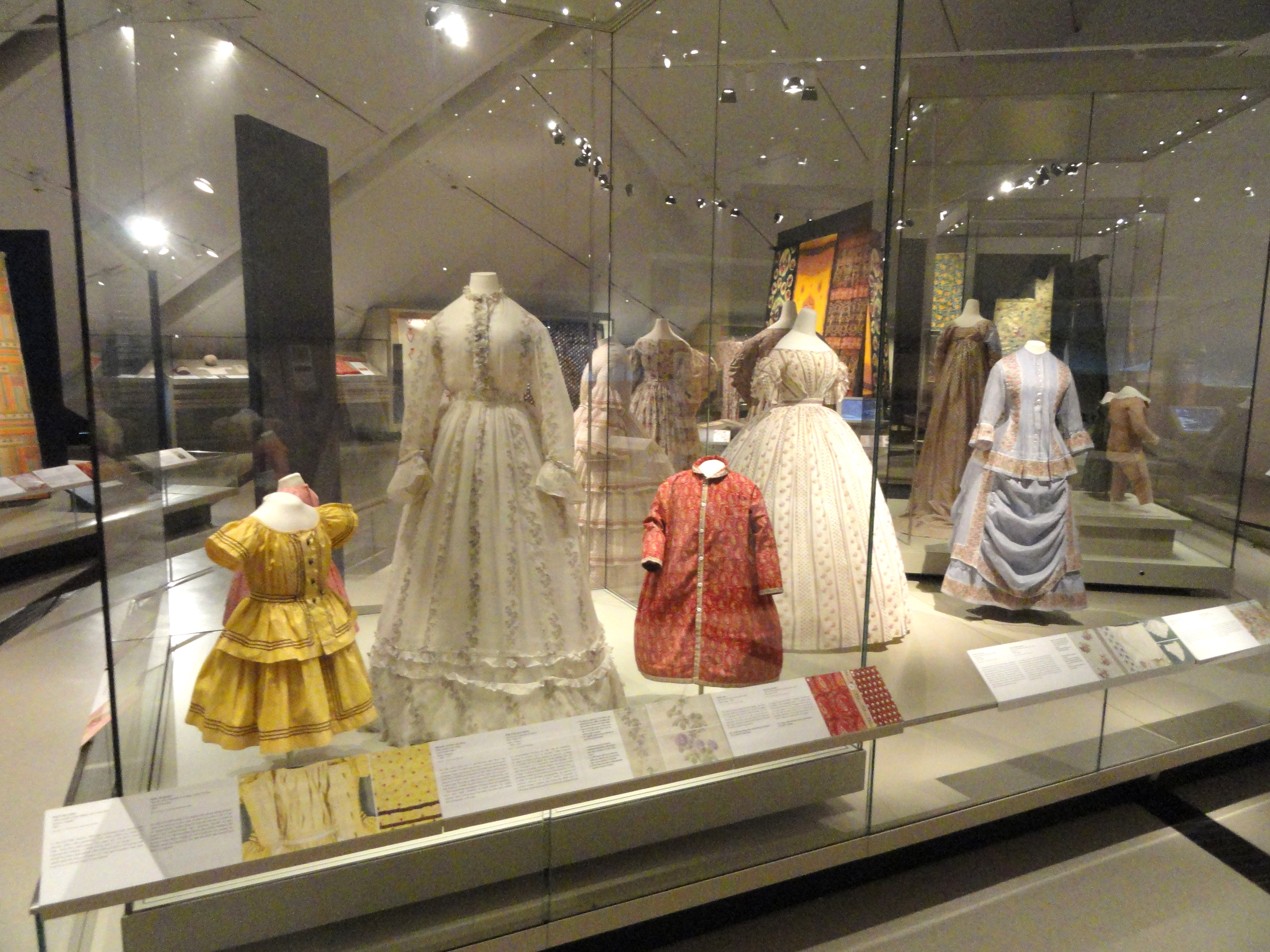
The Patricia Harris Gallery of Costumes and Textiles holds around 200 artifacts from the museum's textile and costume collection.

The Patricia Harris Gallery of Costumes and Textiles holds about 200 artifacts from the ROM's textile and costume collections. These pieces, which range from the 1st century BC to the present day, are rotated frequently due to their fragility. Throughout time, textiles and fashion have been used to establish identity and allow inferences to be drawn about a culture's social customs, economy and survival. The gallery is devoted to showcasing transformations in textile design, manufacturing, and cultural relevance throughout the ages. Weaving, needlework, printed archeological textiles and silks are all located in this space.

=== Interactive ===
The CIBC Discovery Gallery was designed to be a children's learning zone until its closure in 2023. It housed three main areas: In the Earth, Around the World and Close to Home. The space was inspired by the ROM's collections and enabled children to participate in interactive activities involving touchable artifacts and specimens, period costumes, digging for dinosaur bones and examining fossils and meteorites. There was also a special area for preschoolers.

The Patrick and Barbara Keenan Family Gallery of Hands-On Biodiversity introduces visitors to the complicated relationships, which occur among all living things in a fun and interactive space. People of all ages can explore touchable specimens and interactive displays while gallery facilitators help visitors discover the living world around them. Mossy frogs, a touchable shark jaw, snakeskin, and a replica fox's den are some of the objects that connect young visitors to the diversity and interdependence of plants and animals.

=== Institute for Contemporary Culture ===
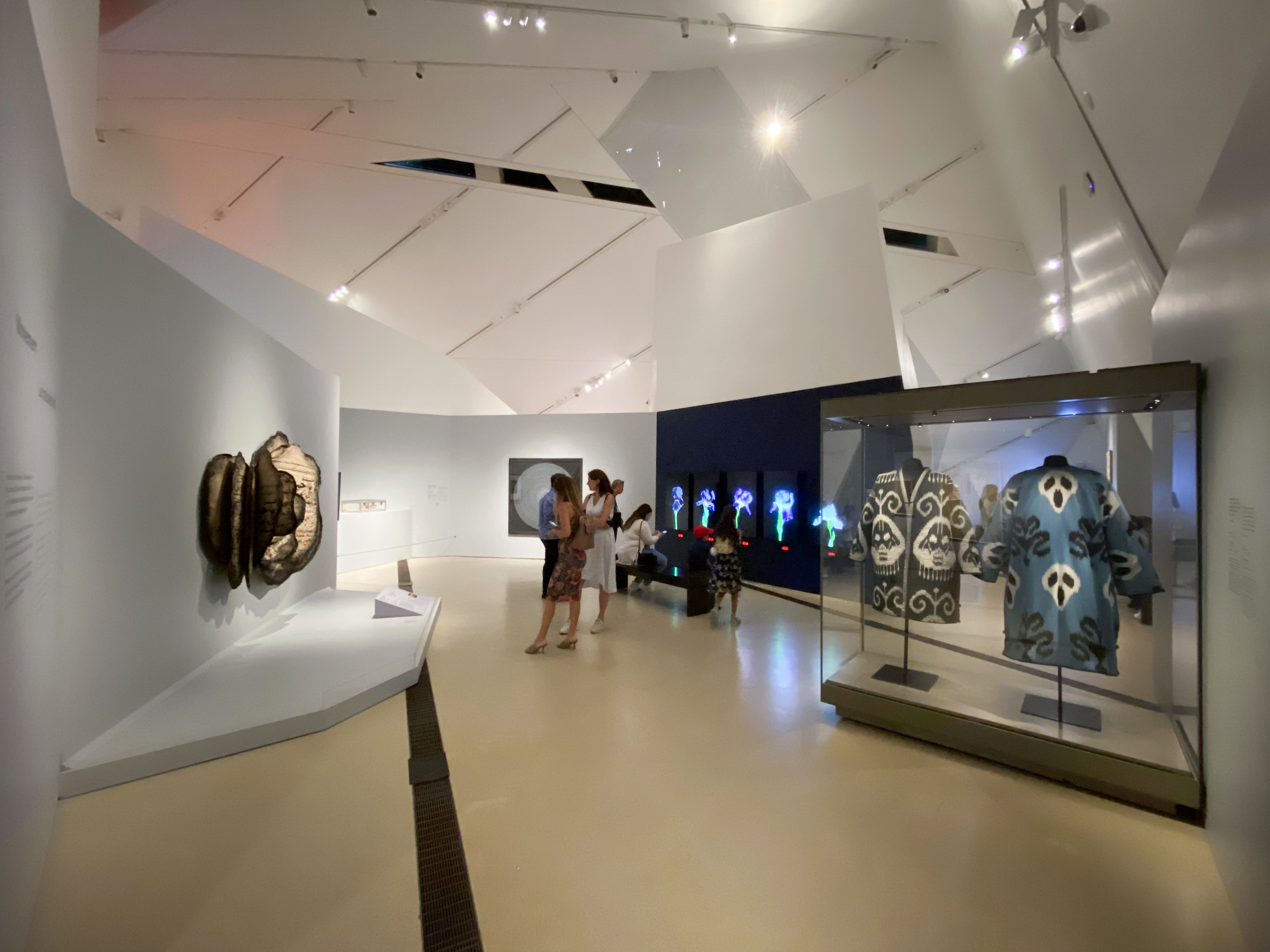
The temporary exhibition Being and Belonging: Contemporary Women Artists from the Islamic World and Beyond, at the Institute for Contemporary Culture gallery

The Roloff Beny Gallery of the Institute for Contemporary Culture (ICC) hosts the Royal Ontario Museum's contemporary art exhibitions. This high-ceilinged multimedia gallery of approximately 6,000 sq ft (600 m^{2}) serves as the ICC's main exhibition space, typically featuring exhibits that tie in contemporary culture and events, with the museum's natural and world collection. The gallery has featured exhibitions on fashion photography, street art, modern Chinese urban design and architecture, and contemporary Japanese art. In 2018, it exhibited Here We Are: Black Canadian Contemporary Art, featuring Black Canadian artists such as Sandra Brewster, Michèle Pearson Clarke, Sylvia D. Hamilton, Bushra Junaid, Charmaine Lurch, and Esmaa Mohamoud.

=== Natural history ===
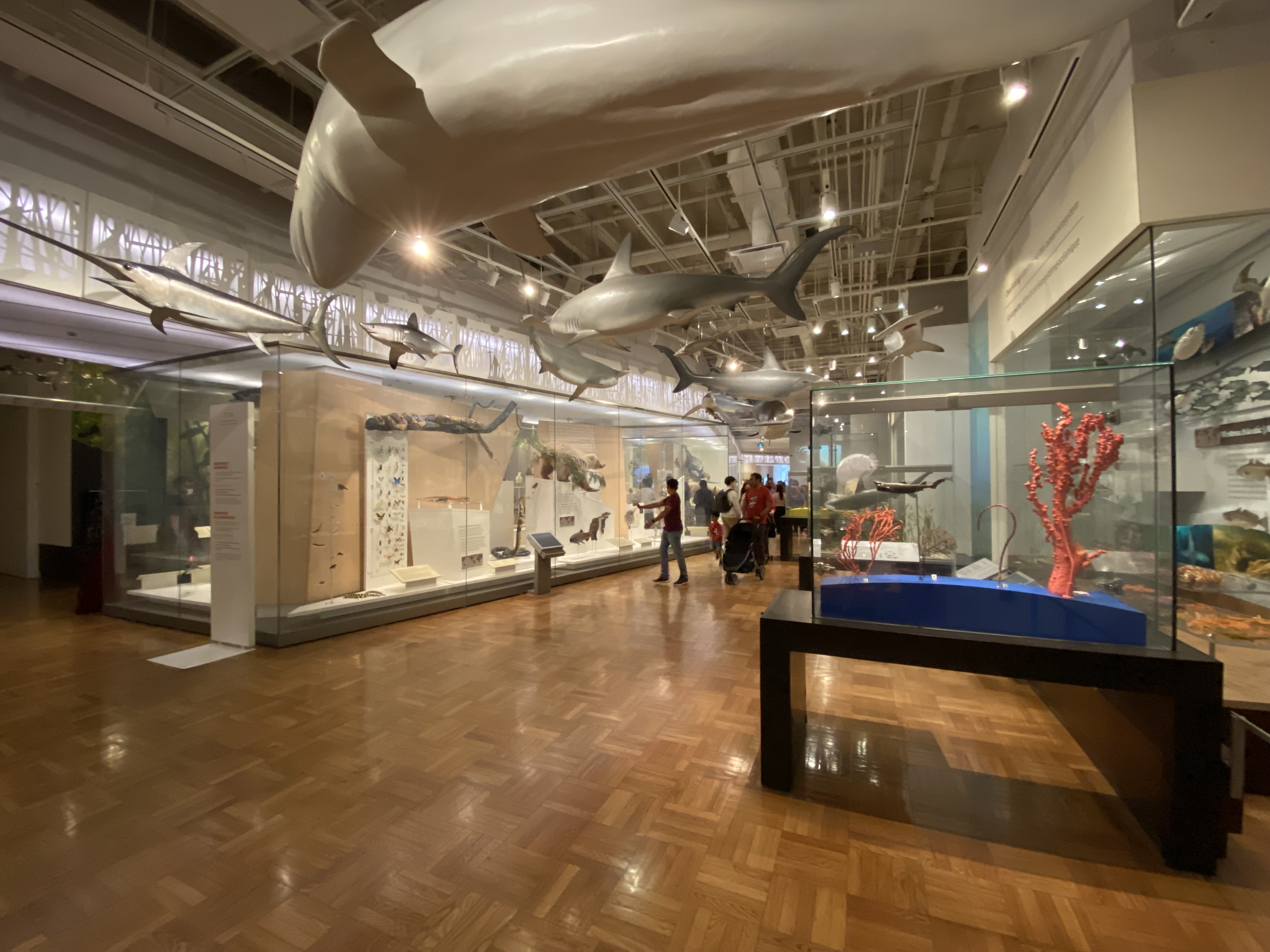
The second floor of the museum contains collections and samples of various animals past and present.

The natural history galleries are all gathered on the second floor of the museum, containing collections and examples of various specimens such as bats, birds and non-avian dinosaurs.

==== Nature and animals ====
The Life in Crisis: Schad Gallery of Biodiversity, designed by Reich+Petch and opened in late 2009, features endangered species, including specimens of a polar bear, a giant panda, a white rhinoceros, a Burmese python, Canadian coral, a leatherback sea turtle, a coelacanth, a Rafflesia flower and many other rare species. Included among these specimens is Bull, a southern white rhinoceros that became a famous conservation success story for his species. There are also recently extinct species displayed, including specimens of a passenger pigeon and a great auk, as well as skeletons of a dodo and a giant moa with a specimen of a moa egg, an elephant bird egg, and many other recently extinct species. The gallery presents the need to protect the natural environment and the need to educate the public about the main causes of extinction—overhunting, habitat destruction, and climate change. In September 2009, the gallery received an Award of Excellence by the Association of Registered Interior Designers of Ontario. In addition to showcasing the museum's natural collection, the Schad Gallery also aims to promote the conservation of Earth's biodiversity.

The Life in Crisis gallery is organized into three zones exploring the central themes: Life is Diverse, Life is interconnected, and Life is at Risk. Anthony Reich, principal at Reich+Petch, called biodiversity "a big subject that's become more relevant to everybody. The challenge was how to tell this big story in a 10,000-square-foot (900 m^{2}) space. We decided to design a dynamic, immersive experience with three core themes that hopefully will make a lasting impression on visitors."

The Tallgrass Prairies and Savannas is a part of the gallery that features one of the most endangered and diverse habitats in Ontario. The display features examples of the regions and the efforts by the Ontario Ministry of Northern Development, Mines, Natural Resources and Forestry to maintain and restore the tallgrass prairies and savannas.

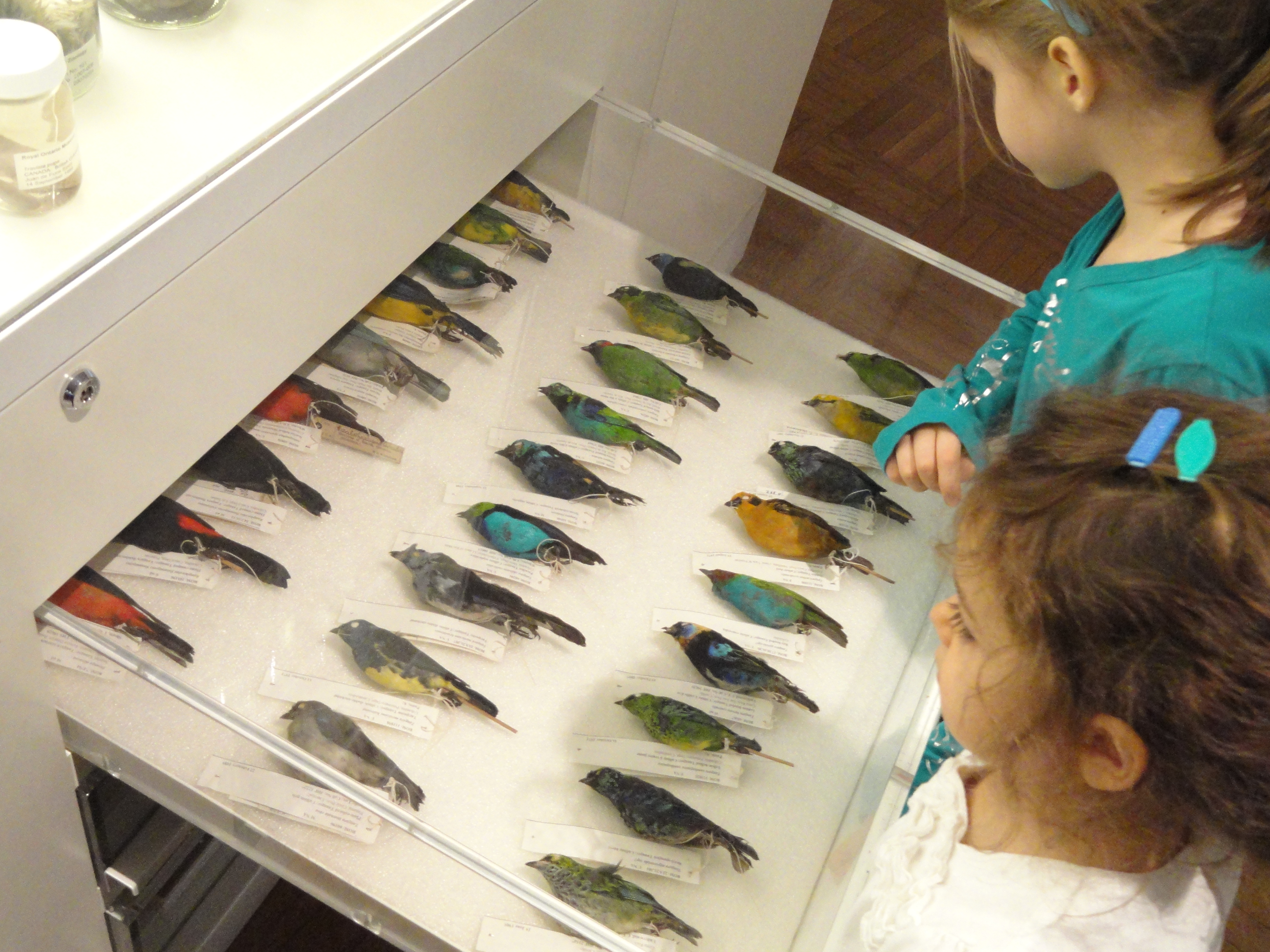
The museum has a large collection of birds from past centuries for viewing.

The Gallery of Birds has on display many bird specimens from past centuries. The Gallery of Birds is dominated by the broad "Birds in flight" display where stuffed birds are enclosed in a glass display for visitors to experience. Dioramas allow visitors to learn about the many bird species and how environmental and habitual changes have put bird species in danger of extinction. Pull-out drawers let visitors examine eggs, feathers, footprints and nests more closely. The gallery included exhibits of other extinct species such as the passenger pigeon. These exhibits were later moved to the Schad Gallery.

The Bat Cave is an immersive experience for visitors that presents over 20 bats and 800 models in a recreated habitat, with accompanying educational panels and video. Originally opened in 1988, the bat cave reopened on 27 February 2010 after extensive renovations. The 1,700-square-foot (160 m^{2}) exhibit most notably includes a recreation of St. Clair Cave located in Saint Catherine Parish of central Jamaica. The original cave was formed by an underground river that flowed 30 metres (98 ft) below ground through the limestone and was three kilometres long. This cave was then recreated in the museum based on ROM fieldwork conducted in Jamaica in 1984. A large amount of bat research has been conducted with support from the ROM. In 2011, the ROM hosted a "bat workshop" connected with the 41st Annual North American Symposium on Bat Research.

==== Earth and space ====
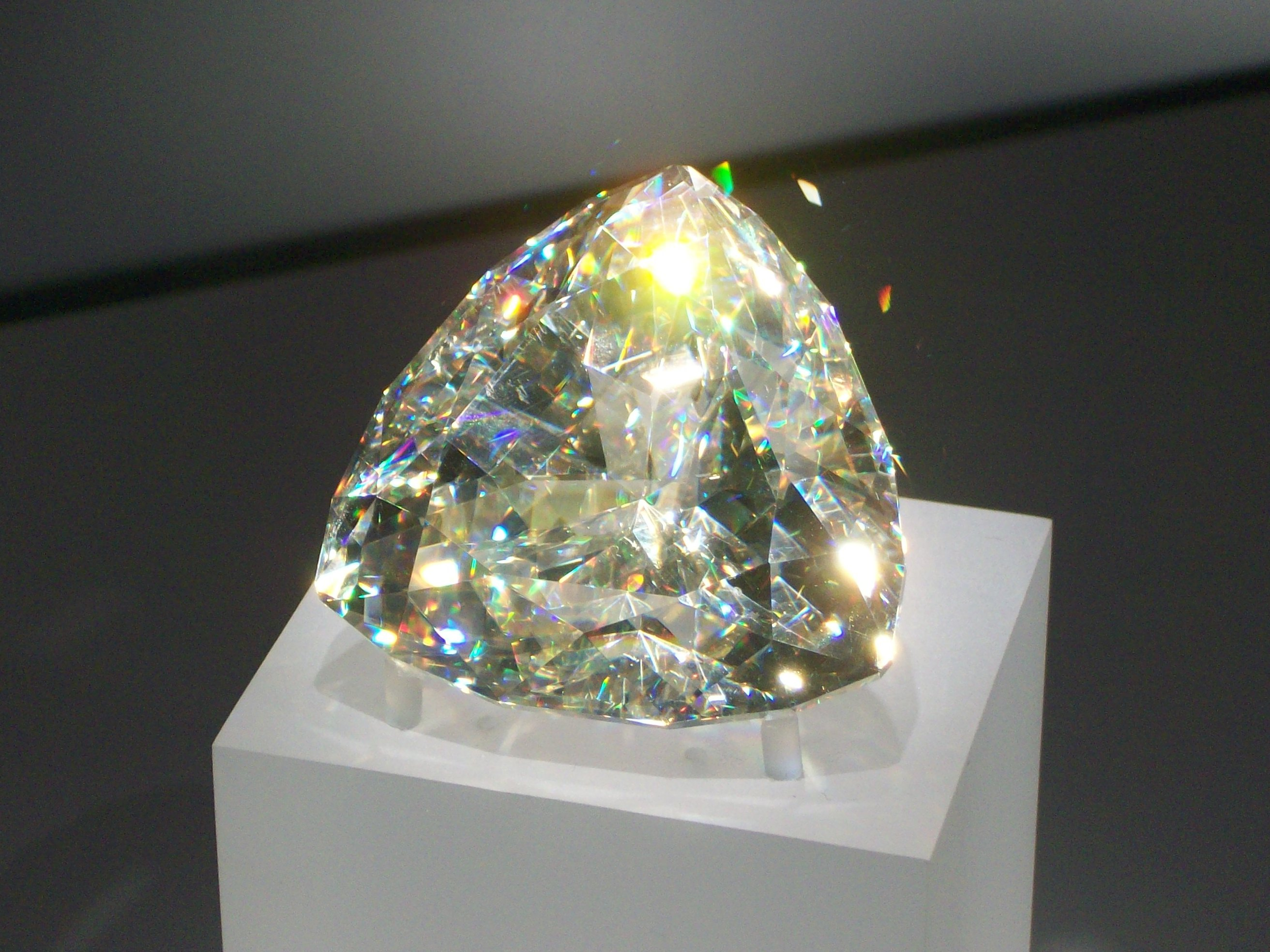
The world's largest faceted cerussite, the Light of the Desert, on display at the Teck Suite of Galleries

The Teck Suite of Galleries: Earth's Treasures features almost 3,000 specimens of minerals, gems, meteorites and rocks ranging from 4.5 billion years ago to the present. These items were found in many different locations including the Earth, Moon and beyond, and represent the Earth's dynamic geological environment. Notable specimens at the Teck Suite of Galleries include fragments of the Tagish Lake meteorite. The Light of the Desert, the world's largest faceted cerussite, is another notable piece displayed in the gallery.

Galleries that are a part of the Teck Suite of Galleries include the Barrick Gold Corporation Gallery, the Canadian Mining Hall of Fame Gallery, the Gallery of Gems and Gold and the Vale Gallery of Minerals.

==== Fossils and evolution ====
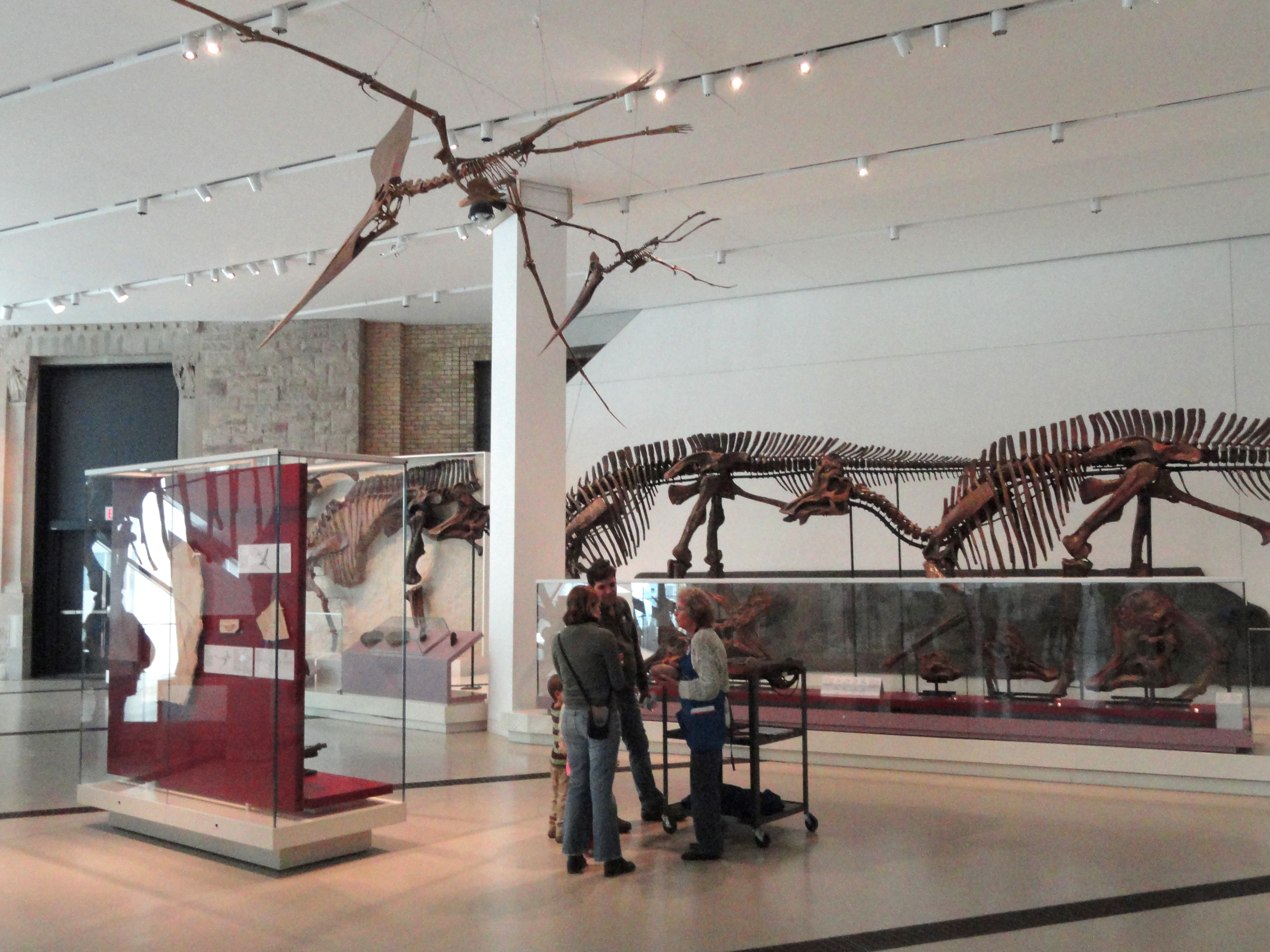
Fossils in the James and Louise Temerty Galleries of the Age of Dinosaurs and Gallery

The Reed Gallery of the Age of Mammals explores the rise of mammals through the Cenozoic Era that followed the extinction of the non-avian dinosaurs. There are over 400 specimens from North America and South America in addition to 30 fossil skeletons of extinct mammals. The gallery's entrance begins with mammals that arose shortly after the extinction of the non-avian dinosaurs. Notable displays in the gallery include the sabre-toothed nimravid Dinictis, an American Mastodon discovered in southern Ontario near the city of Welland, and the giant megatherid sloth Eremotherium.

The James and Louise Temerty Galleries of the Age of Dinosaurs and Gallery of the Age of Mammals feature several complete non-avian dinosaur skeletons, in addition to several early birds, reptiles, mammals, and marine animals ranging from the Jurassic to Cretaceous periods. The highlights of the exhibit are Gordo, one of the most complete Barosaurus specimens and the largest dinosaur on display in Canada, and the holotype of the tube-crested hadrosaur Parasaurolophus walkeri. Renovations to the Temerty Galleries completed in late 2025, with new additions highlighted by the skeleton of the exceptionally preserved ankylosaur Zuul crurivastator, a mounted confrontation between Zuul and the tyrannosaurid Gorgosaurus, and a cast of the ceratopsian Wendiceratops pinhornensis.

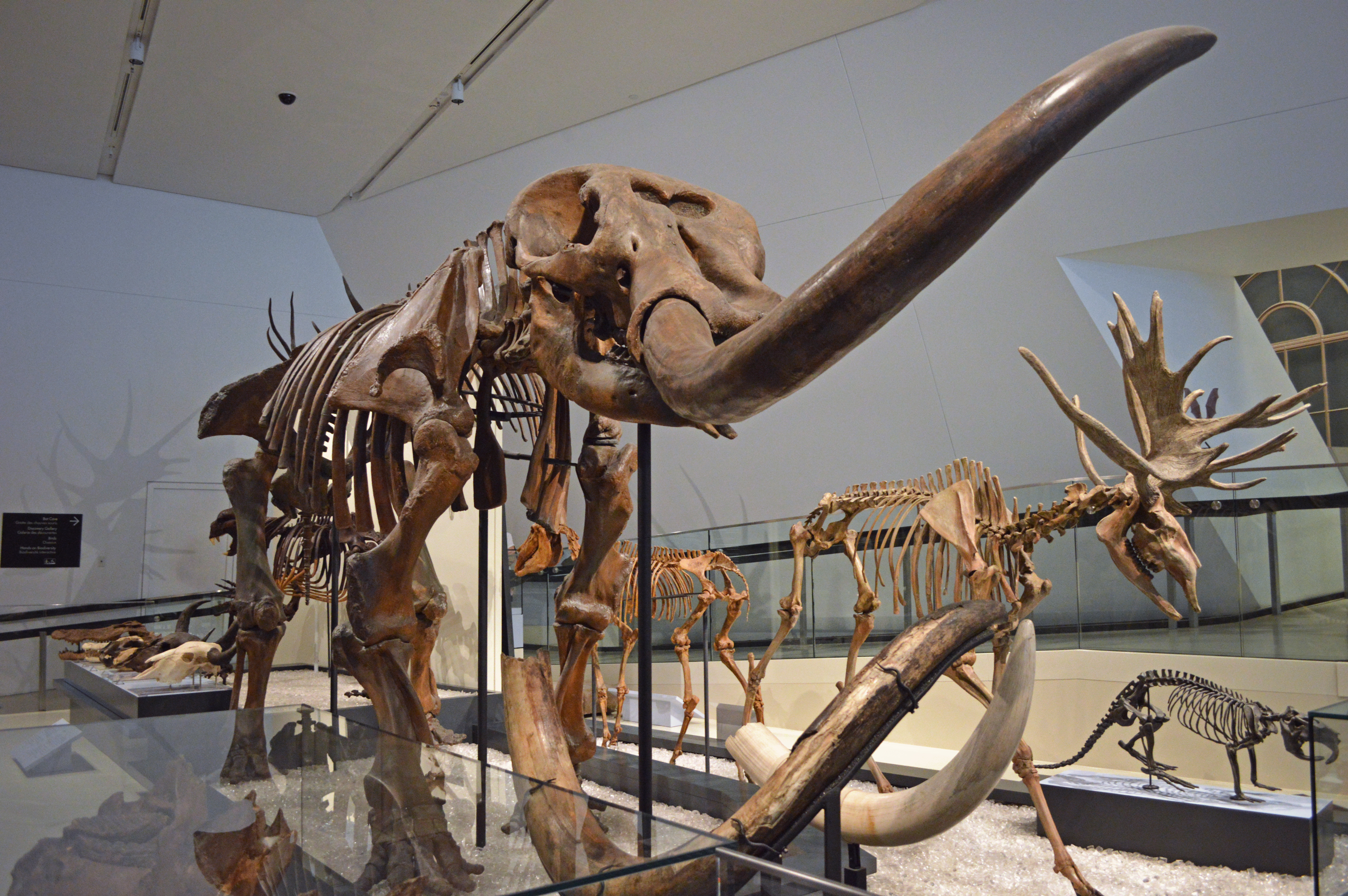
Fossils in the Gallery of the Age of Mammals

The Willner Madge Gallery, Dawn of Life opened in 2021 in the former Peter F. Bronfman Hall, and focuses on the evolution of life in the Paleozoic from billions of years ago up to the Late Triassic. It highlights many fossil sites and collections from Canada, such as the Burgess Shale in British Columbia and Mistaken Point in Newfoundland and Labrador. The gallery is divided into six sections: "A Very Long Beginning" (Precambrian), "The Origin of Animals" (Cambrian Explosion), "The Bustling Seas" (Ordovician, Silurian, and Devonian), "The Green Earth" (Devonian and Carboniferous, including both the Mississippian and the Pennsylvanian subperiods), "Before the Great Dying" (Permian) and "Dawn of a New Era" (Triassic). Notable specimens include the Burgess Shale, orthocones and sea scorpions and other fossils from Ontario and the holotype of Dimetrodon borealis.

=== World culture ===
The world culture galleries display a wide variety of objects from around the world. These range from Stone Age implements from China and Africa to 20th-century art and design. In July 2011, the museum added to this collection when a number of new permanent galleries were unveiled. Both the Government of Canada and the Royal Ontario Museum committed $2.75 million toward the project. The galleries are located on the first, third and fourth levels of the museum.

==== Africa, the Americas, and Asia–Pacific ====
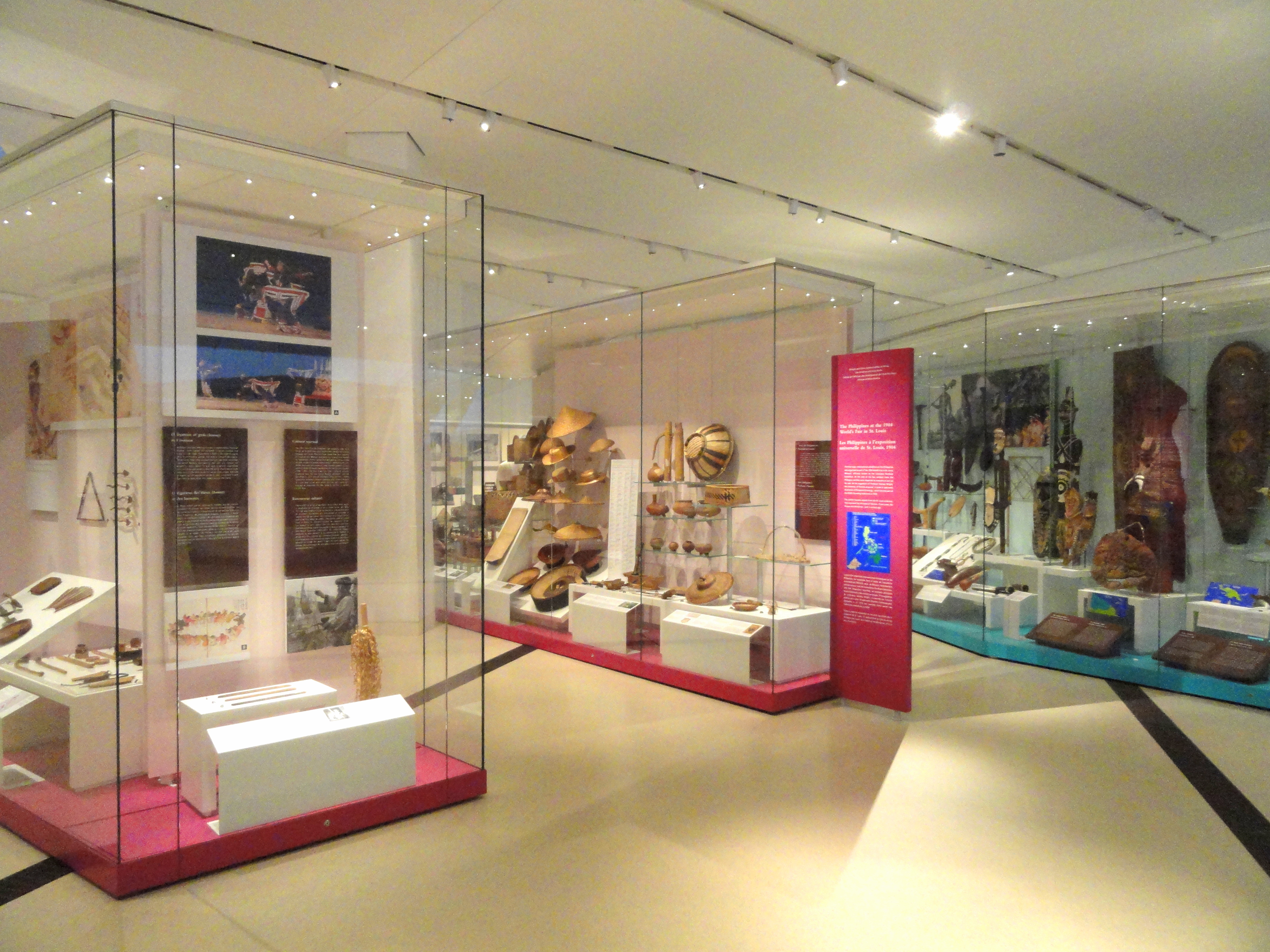
Exhibits at the Shreyas and Mina Ajmera Gallery of Africa, the Americas and Asia-Pacific, one of several world culture galleries at the museum

The Shreyas and Mina Ajmera Gallery of Africa, the Americas and Asia-Pacific features a collection of 1,400 artifacts that reflect the artistic and cultural traditions of the indigenous peoples from four different geographical areas: Africa, the American continents, the Asia-Pacific region and Oceania. On display are objects such as ceremonial masks, ceramics, and a shrunken head.

==== South Asia and Middle East ====
The Sir Christopher Ondaatje South Asian Gallery holds a diverse collection of objects such as decorative art, armour and sculptures that represents the culture of Indian subcontinent. The gallery has approximately 350 objects that represent over 5,000 years of history. Due to the wide range of history and cultures on display, the gallery is split into numerous different sections—the "Material Remains", "Imagining the Buddha", "Visualizing Divinity", "Passage to Enlightenment", "Courtly Culture", "Cultural Exchange" and "Home and the World". In this gallery, visitors can find the (Untitled) Blue Lady sculpture by Mumbai-based artist Navjot Altaf.

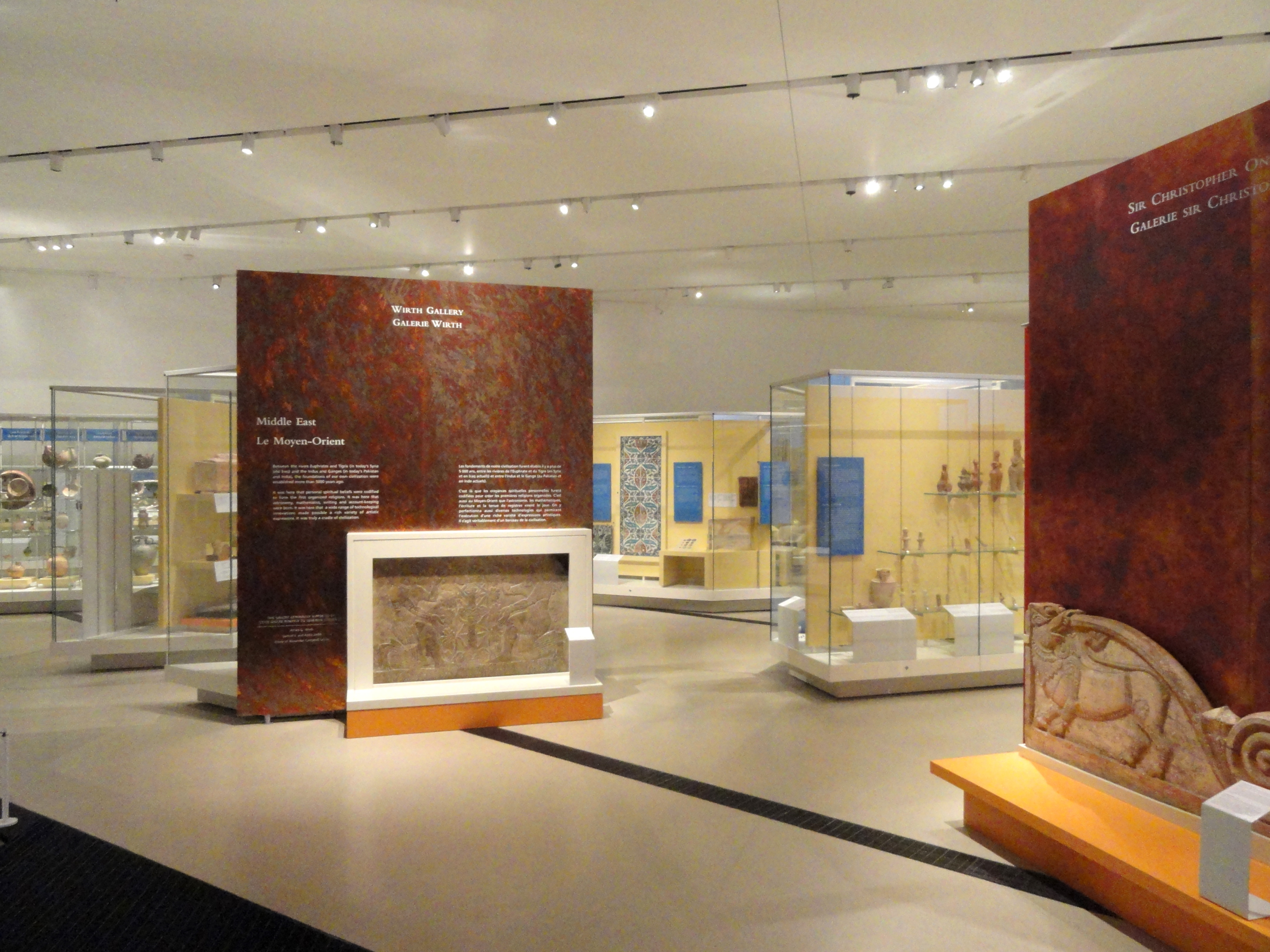
The Wirth Gallery of the Middle East explores civilizations from the Palaeolithic Age to AD 1900 found within the Fertile Crescent.

The Wirth Gallery of the Middle East explores civilizations from the Palaeolithic Age to AD 1900 found within the Fertile Crescent, which stretches from the Eastern Mediterranean and Persia (Iran) and Mesopotamia (Iraq) to the Arabian Peninsula and the Levant (Lebanon and Israel). The over 1,000 artifacts relate to the writing, technology, spirituality, everyday life and warfare of the ancient Sumerians, Akkadians, Babylonians, and Assyrians. These Mesopotamian civilizations made major advances in writing, mathematics, law, medicine and religion, which are represented throughout the gallery, as well as that of the Achaemenid dynasty of Persia. Pieces from the museum's collection that are featured at the Wirth Gallery of the Middle East include plastered human skulls made in the Levant c. 8000 BC. Another notable piece in the gallery is the Striding Lion, a wall relief from the throne room of King Nebuchadnezzar II's palace in Babylon.

==== Mediterranean and Nile valley ====
The Eaton Gallery of Rome is home to a millennium of ancient Roman culture. It has the largest collection of classical antiquities in Canada, displaying more than 500 objects that range from marble or painted portraits of historical figures to Roman jewellery. The gallery also features the Bratty Exhibit of Etruria that sheds some light on the Etruscans, a neighbouring civilization that was later absorbed by the expanding Rome.

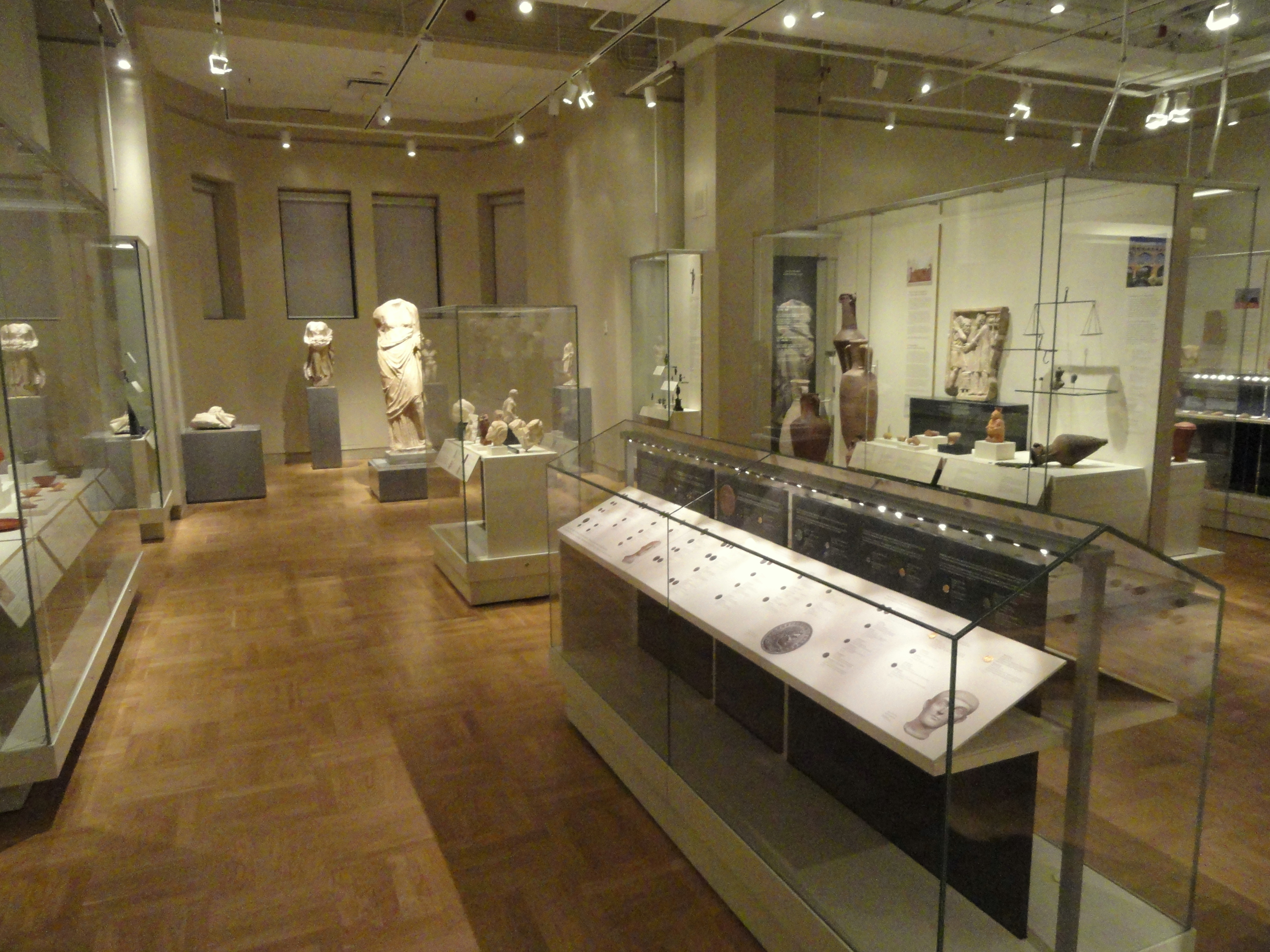
The museum is home to an extensive collection of Roman artifacts in the Eaton Gallery of Rome and in the Joey and Toby Tanenbaum Gallery of Rome and the Near East.

The Joey and Toby Tanenbaum Gallery of Rome and the Near East depicts the lifestyle and culture of societies under Roman rule and their influence in the Near East. The same space holds the Joey and Toby Tanenbaum Gallery of Byzantium, covering the history of the Byzantine Empire from AD 330 to 1453, during which crucial changes took place in early eastern Christianity. There are over 230 artifacts that relate to the dedication of Constantinople, the fall of the Western Roman Empire, the Medieval Crusades and the conquest by the Ottoman Turks—items such as jewellery, glasswork and coins help to illustrate the vast history of modern-day Istanbul.

The A. G. Leventis Foundation Gallery of Ancient Cyprus houses roughly 300 artifacts, focusing on the art created in Cyprus between 2200 and 30 BC. The gallery is divided into five sections: "Cyprus and Commerce", "Ancient Cypriot Pottery Types", "Sculptures", "Ancient Cyprus at a Glance" and "Art & Society: Interpretations". The collection includes a reconstructed open-air sanctuary and a rare bronze relief statue of a man carrying a large copper ingot.

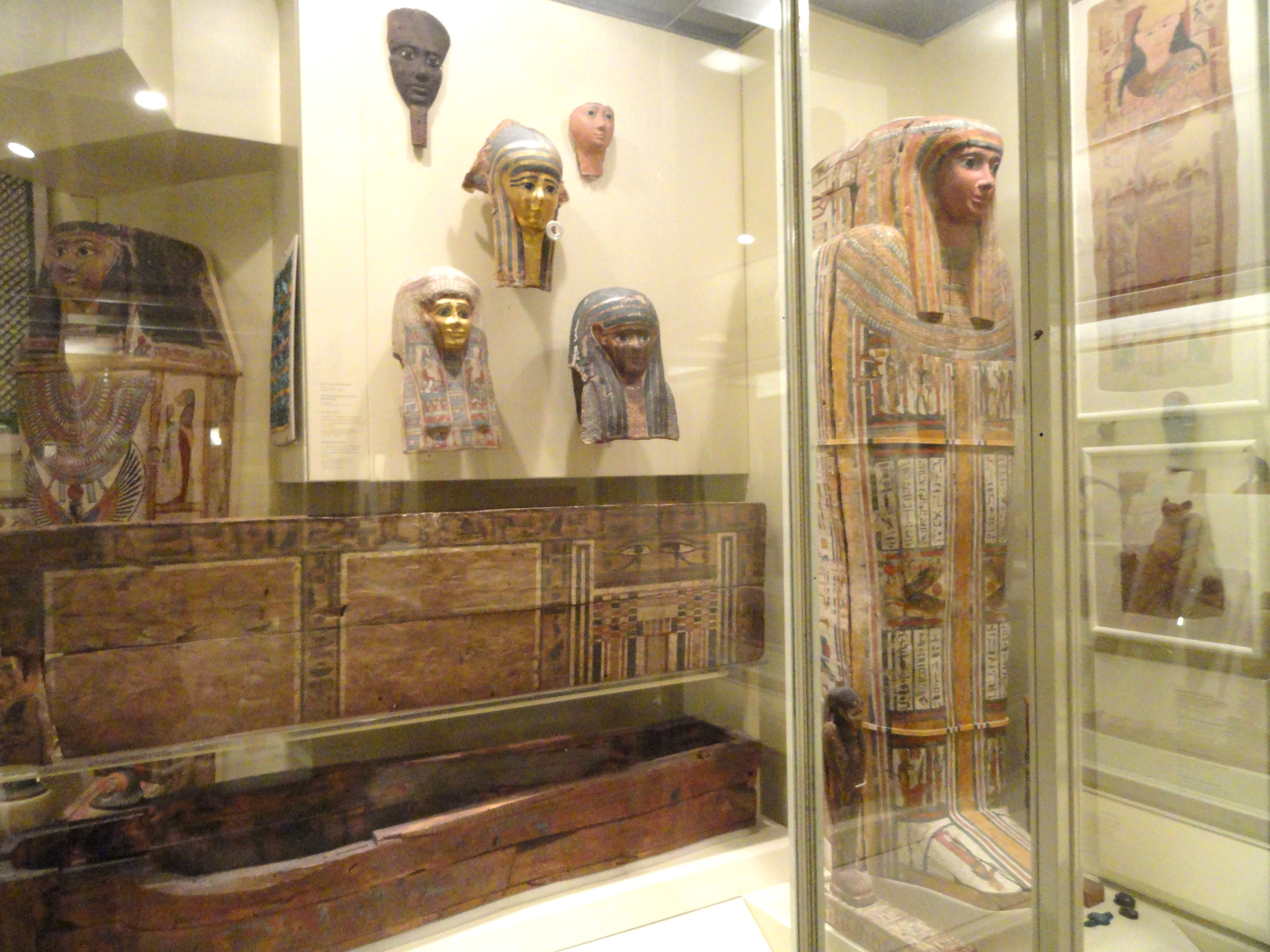
The Gallery of Africa: Egypt includes a number of cartonnages.

The Gallery of Africa: Egypt focuses on the life (and the afterlife) of Ancient Egyptians. It includes a wide range of artifacts, ranging from agricultural implements, jewellery, cosmetics, funerary furnishings and more. The exhibit includes a number of canopic jars and mummy cases, including the fine gilded and painted sarcophagus and mummy of Djedmaatesankh, who was a female musician at the temple of Amun-Re in Thebes; and the mummy of Antjau, who is thought to have been a wealthy landowner. Other items featured in the gallery include the Book of the Dead of Amen-em-hat, a 7-metre (23 ft) long scroll from circa 320 BC and the Bust of Cleopatra from c. 47 BC to 30 BC. The Statue of Sekhmet can also be viewed at the gallery. Depicting Sekhmet, one of ancient Egypt's oldest deities, the item dates back to c. 1390–1325 BC.

The Galleries of Africa: Nubia feature a collection of objects that explore the once-flourishing civilization of Nubia in modern-day Sudan. The Nubians were the first urban literate society in Africa south of the Sahara and were Egypt's main rival.

The Gallery of the Bronze Age Aegean features over 100 objects that include examples from the Cycladic, Minoan, Mycenaean and Geometric periods of Ancient Greece. The collection ranges in age from 3200 BC to 700 BC and contains a variety of objects that include a marble head of a female figure and a glass necklace.

The Gallery of Greece has a collection of 1,500 artifacts that span the Archaic, Classical and Hellenistic periods. The collection consists of items such as sculptures of deities, armour and a coin collection.

==== Canadian ====
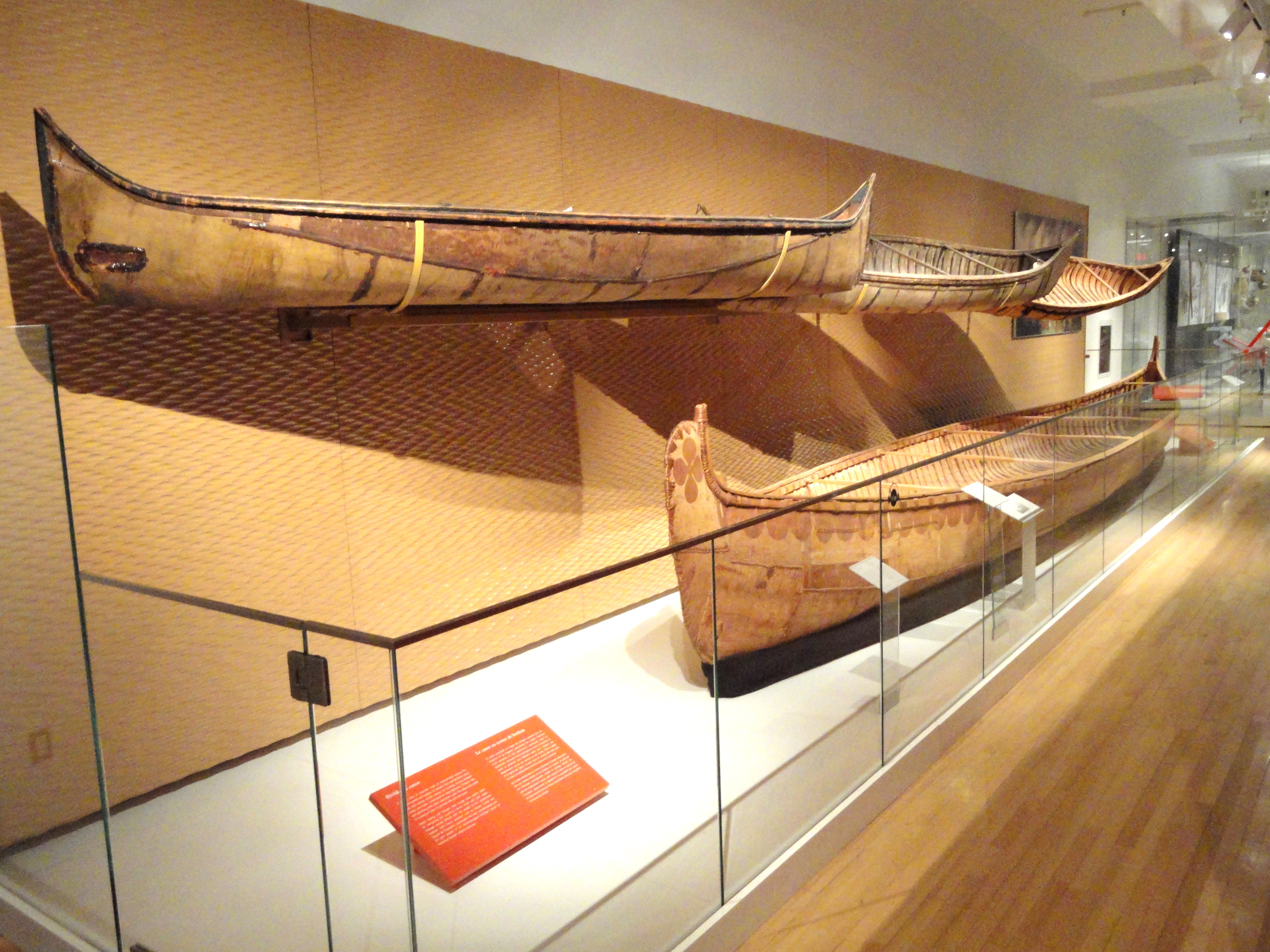
Canoes used by the First Nations at The Daphne Cockwell Gallery of Canada: First Peoples.

The Daphne Cockwell Gallery of Canada: First Peoples provides a look inside the culture of Canada's earliest societies: the Aboriginal Peoples of Canada. The gallery contains more than 1,000 artifacts that help to reveal the economic and social forces that have influenced Native art. In 2018, the gallery became free of charge for the public to access.

The Royal Ontario Museum holds a major but little-known collection of Northwest Coast native art and artifacts acquired by the Reverend Dr. Richard Whitfield Large at Bella Bella, British Columbia, between 1899 and 1906 known as the "R. W. Large Collection". Although the collection is one of the most important Heiltsuk collections in existence because of its unique documentation, there has never been a comprehensive study of it. Subject of the book Bella Bella: A Season of Heiltsuk Art, the collection was also part of the Kaxlaya Gvilas (Heiltsuk) exhibit put together collaboratively with the Heiltsuk Nation and the University of British Columbia.

There is also a rotating display of contemporary Native art, an area dedicated to the works of pioneer artist Paul Kane and a theatre devoted to traditional storytelling. Just outside this gallery, the central staircase winds around the Nisga'a and Haida Crest Poles.

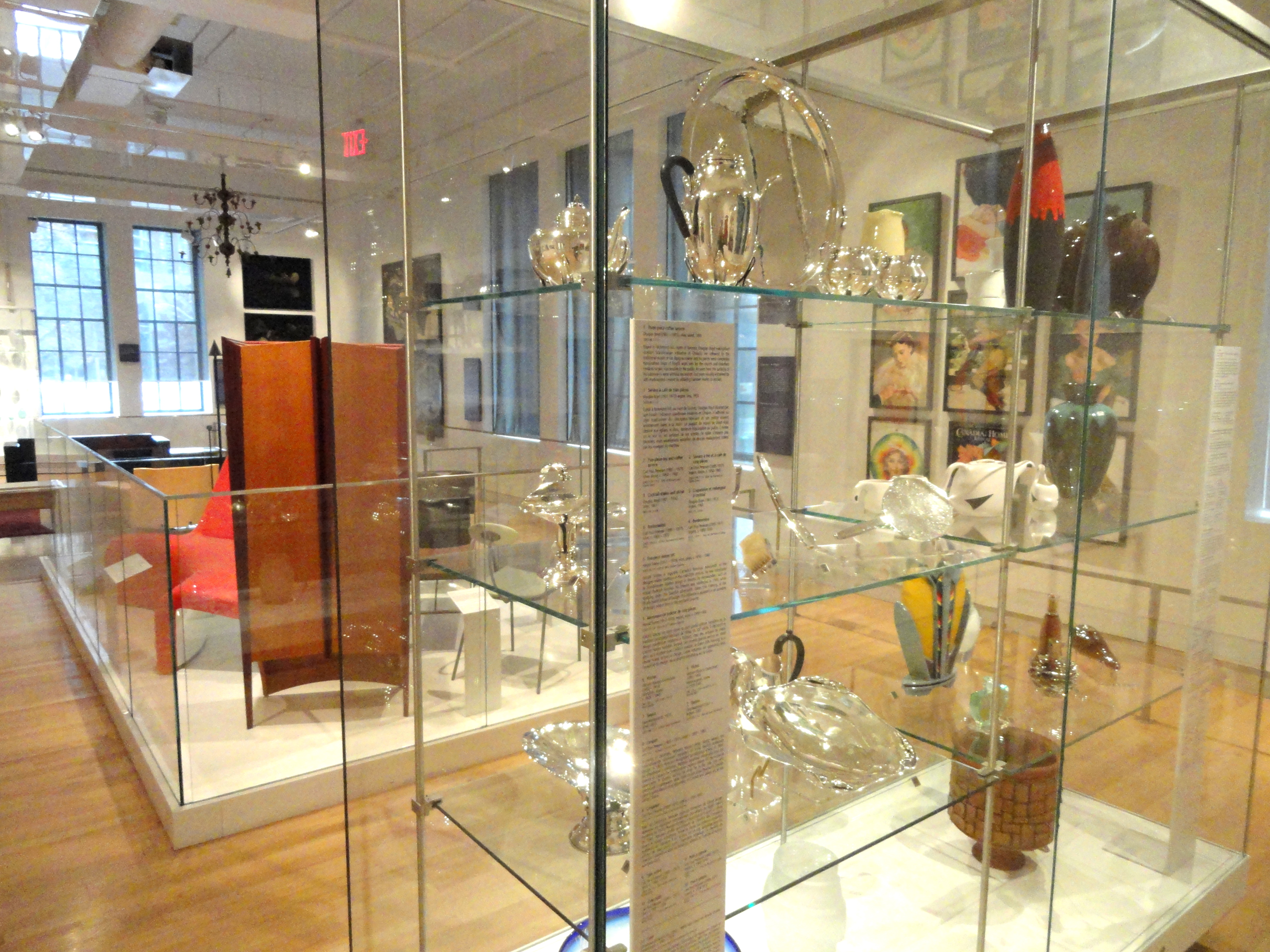
Exhibits of early Canadian memorabilia on display at the Sigmund Samuel Gallery of Canada

The Sigmund Samuel Gallery of Canada was located on the Weston Family Wing, displaying collections of early Canadian memorabilia, the majority of which is historical decorative and pictorial arts, but also included a number of historical artifacts among other things. The gallery had approximately 560 artifacts on display and covers the period from early European settlement to the beginning of the modern industrial era. The displays are split up into sections to display the strength and weaknesses of the collections reflect the French and British cultural heritage of Canada. A notable item from the museum's collection that was featured at the Sigmund Samuel Gallery of Canada include The Death of General Wolfe by Benjamin West. It closed in 2022.

==== East Asian ====
The Chinese Galleries comprise four sections: the Bishop White Gallery of Chinese Temple Art, the Joey and Toby Tanenbaum Gallery of China, the Matthews Family Court of Chinese Sculpture and the ROM Gallery of Chinese Architecture.

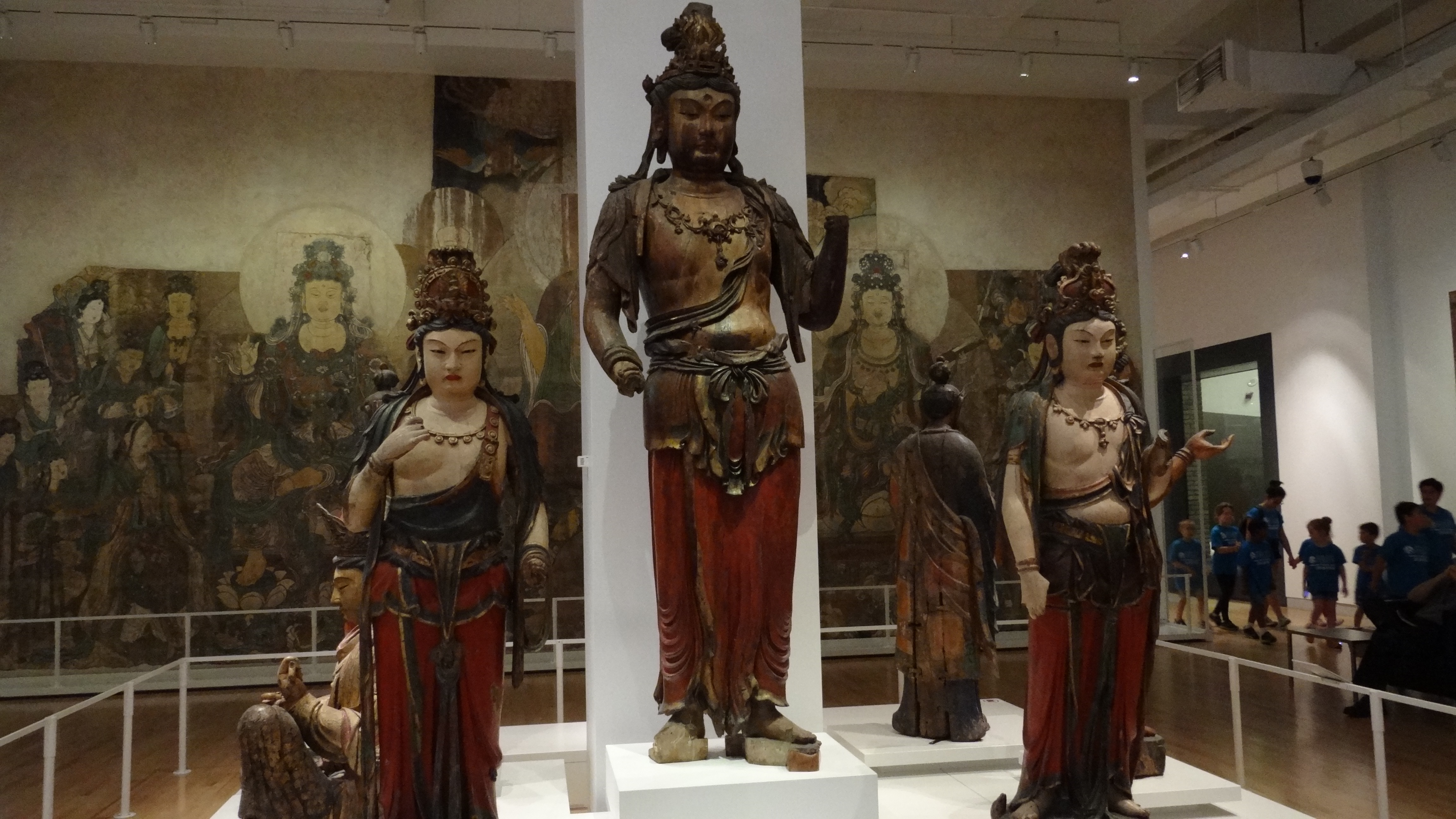
Works on exhibit in the Bishop White Gallery of Chinese Temple Art

The Bishop White Gallery of Chinese Temple Art gallery contains three of the world's best-preserved temple wall paintings from the Mongol-ruled Yuan dynasty (AD 1271–1386) and a number of wooden sculptures depicting various bodhisattvas from the 12th to 15th centuries. Chinese temple wall paintings featured in this gallery include the Homage to the Highest Power, a Daoist wall painting dating to circa 1300 and Paradise of Maitreya, another Chinese wall temple painting from 1298.

The Joey and Toby Tanenbaum Gallery of China consists of approximately 2,500 objects spanning almost 7,000 years of Chinese history. The gallery is divided into five sections: the "T. T. Tsui Exhibit of Prehistory and Bronze Age"; the "Qin and Han Dynasties"; the "Michael C. K. Lo Exhibition of North, South, Sui and Tang"; the "Song, Yuan and Frontier Dynasties"; and the "Ming and Qing Dynasties". Each section focuses on a different period of Chinese history, displaying objects ranging from jade discs to pieces of furniture.

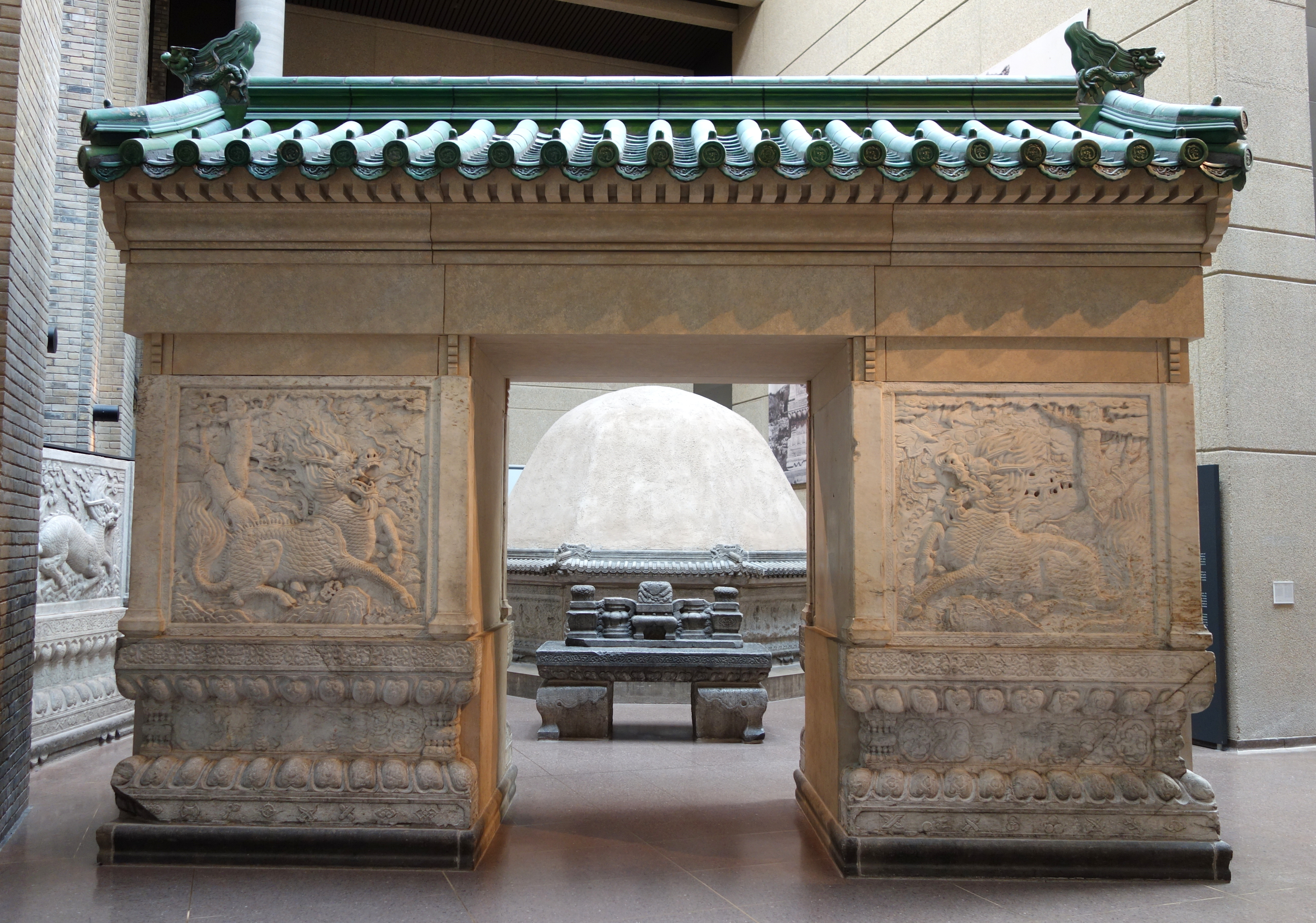
The Tomb of General Zu Dashou on display in the ROM Gallery of Chinese Architecture

The Matthews Family Court of Chinese Sculpture has a wide variety of sculptures that span 2,000 years of Chinese sculptural art. It also displays a number of smaller objects that explore the development of religions in China from the 3rd to 19th centuries AD. The gallery features several notable items from the museum's collection, including Wei Bin's Temple Bell, a ceremonial bell crafted in 1518, and the companion statues of Kashyapa and Ananda, two statues that originate from the Tang dynasty. The gallery also features one of the Yixian glazed pottery luohans, a glazed sculpture that dates to the 11th century AD.

The ROM Gallery of Chinese Architecture houses one of the largest collections of Chinese architectural artifacts outside of China and is the first gallery of Chinese architecture in North America. Artifacts held in the gallery include the Tomb of General Zu Dashou. The tomb includes an assortment of related artifacts, including the altar, stone burial mound and archway. The gallery holds some spectacular exhibits such as a reconstruction of an Imperial Palace building from Beijing's Forbidden City and a Ming-era tomb complex. It also holds ink rubbings from Ming-era steles originally located by a synagogue in Kaifeng in Henan province in central China.

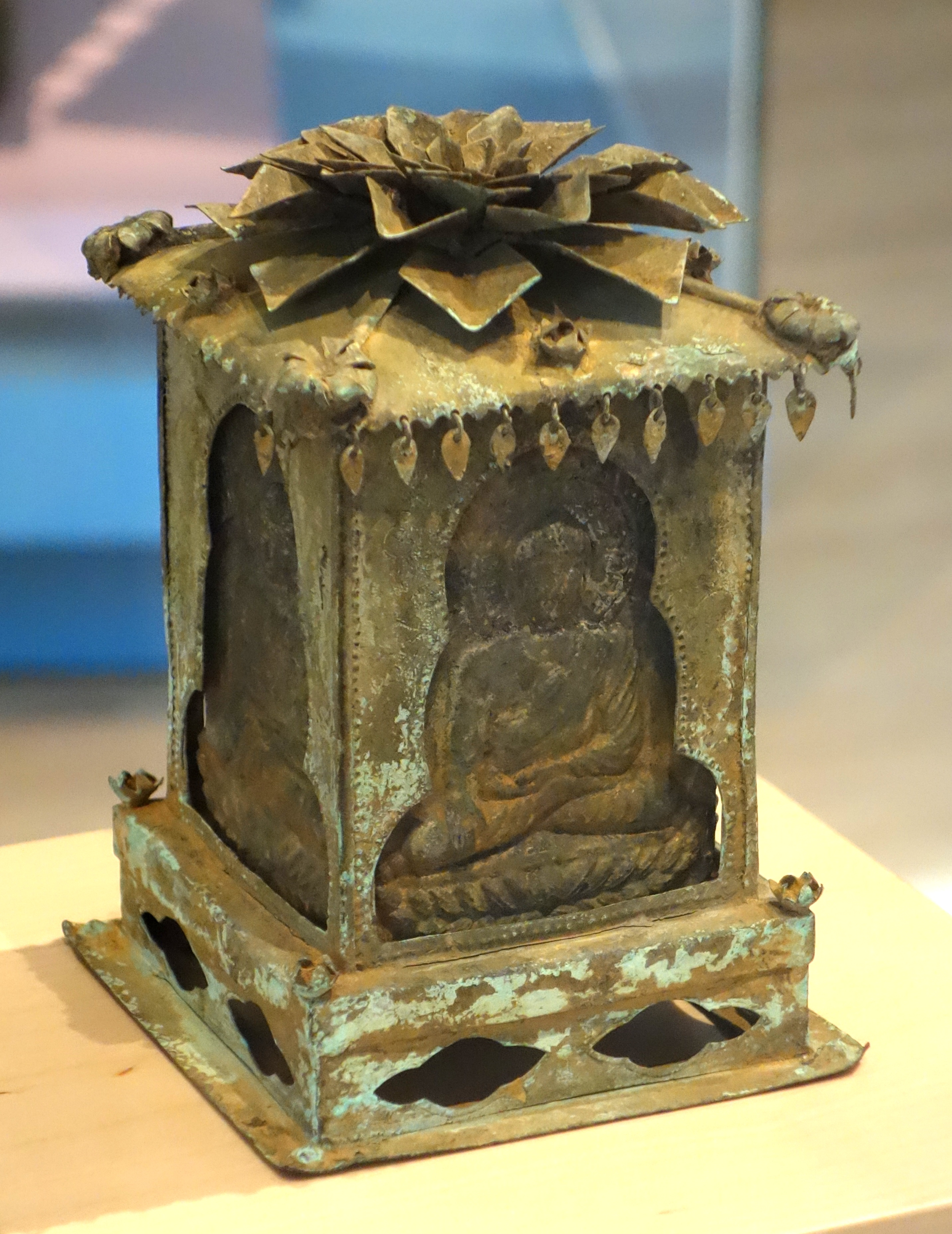
A Buddhist reliquary śarīra casket at the Gallery of Korea gallery

The Gallery of Korea is the only permanent gallery of Korean art in Canada, showcasing approximately 260 items from the Korean peninsula. Furniture, ceramics, metalwork, printing technology, painting and decorative arts, dating from the 3rd to 20th centuries AD, illustrate the many accomplishments to Korean culture. The influence of Buddhism on Korean culture is portrayed with two statues, the first being a śarīra casket, which originated in India and were made to enshrine the remains of a Buddha or enlightened masters and the second of a tomb guardian.

The Herman Herzog Levy Gallery is the primary venue for East Asian exhibitions visiting the museum. The Portrait of Namjar was previously displayed in the gallery, although it was later removed and taken to storage.

The museum also formerly held the Prince Takamado Gallery of Japan, which contained the largest collection of Japanese artworks in Canada, featuring a rotating display of ukiyo-e prints and the only tea master collection in North America. Notable pieces of Japanese art featured in the Prince Takamado Gallery of Japan included Fan print with two bugaku dancers and Unit 88-9. The gallery was split into a number of different sections, each home to the collection of objects that the name suggests: the "Toyota Canada Inc. Exhibit of Ukiyo-e Pictures", the "Sony Exhibit of Painting", the "Canon Canada Inc. Samurai Exhibit", the "Mitsui & Co. Canada Tea Ceremony Exhibit", the "Maple Leaf Foods Exhibit of Lacquers" and the "Linamar Corporation Exhibit of Ceramics". The gallery was named in honour of the late Japanese Prince Takamado (also known as Norihito), who spent several years at Queen's University in Kingston, Ontario.

==== European ====
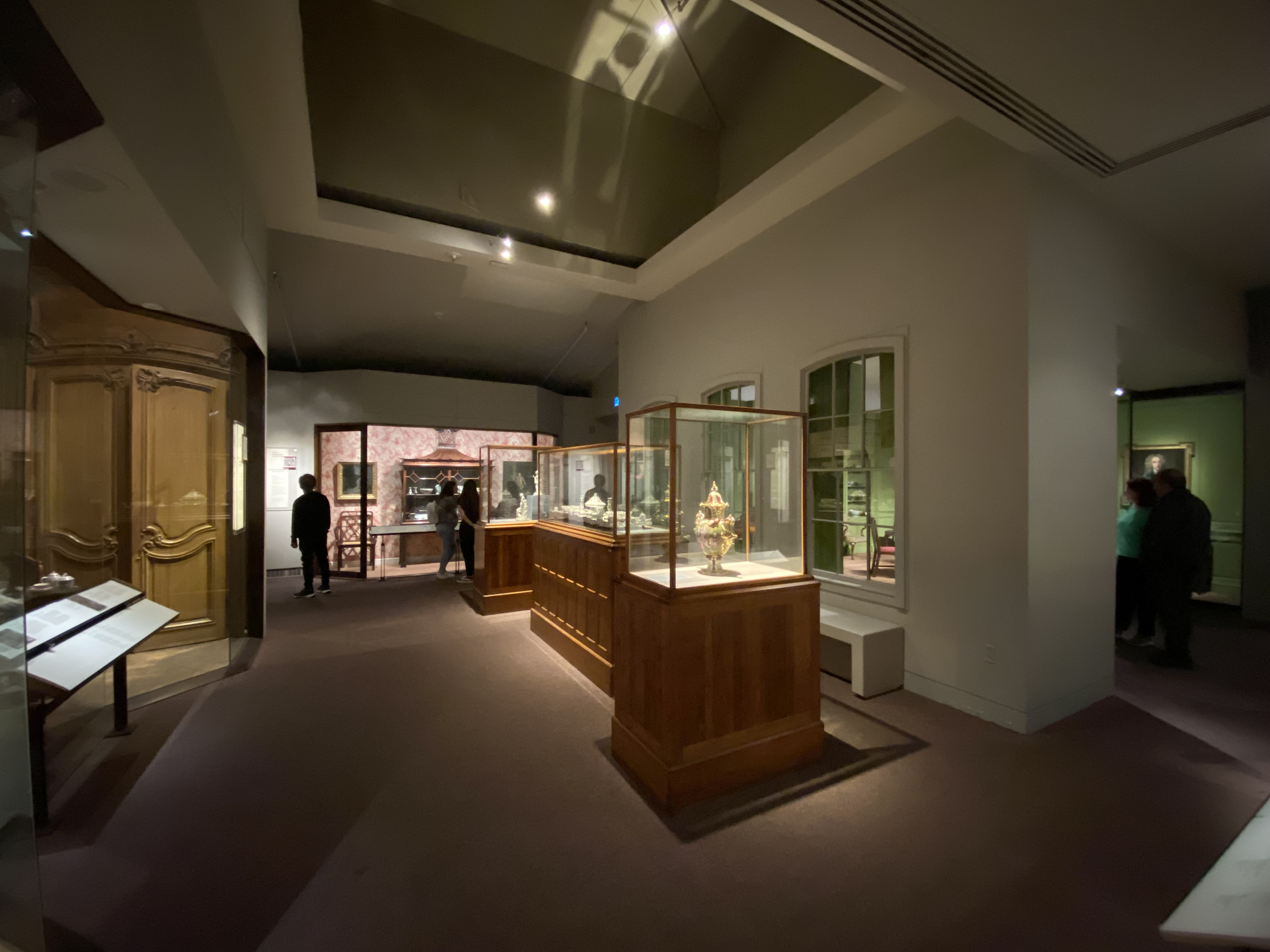
Exhibits in the Samuel European Galleries

The Samuel European Galleries have over 4,600 objects on display that chronicle the development of decorative and other arts in Europe from the Middle Ages to the 20th century. The period rooms depict the development of decorative arts in Central and Western Europe by showcasing changes in style during the Renaissance, Baroque, Rococo, Neoclassical and Victorian periods. Other specialized collections relating to Culture and Context, Judaica, Art Deco and Arms and Armour are also displayed. At the Samuel European Galleries is the Earl of Pembroke's Armour. Dating from 1550 to 1570, the plate armour was crafted for William Herbert, 1st Earl of Pembroke. Another notable piece from the museum's European collection is the Otho tazza. The piece was one of 12 tazzas that made up the Aldobrandini Tazze, a set of Renaissance-era cups that featured Julius Caesar and the first 11 Roman emperors whose lives are described in the AD 121 publication The Twelve Caesars.

== Travelling exhibitions ==
One of the main ways the Royal Ontario Museum presents itself to the public and attracts visitors is through special exhibitions. The museum has both hosted travelling exhibitions on its property and developed interdisciplinary travelling exhibitions of its own based on subjects covered by the museum, including art, culture and natural history. Travelling exhibitions developed by the ROM are typically hosted by partner institutions and museums in East Asia, Europe and the United States.

As a part of its provincial mandate, the ROM's outreach department has developed a travelling education program that provides exhibitions and school kits to communities across Canada. In the late 20th century, the museum also organized travelling exhibitions for display at other institutions. One such exhibition, Into the Heart of Africa, was displayed at the ROM from 1989 to 1990 and was scheduled to tour four additional museums in Canada and the United States, although the four institutions that planned to host it withdrew from it due to its controversial nature. The ROM continued to develop select travelling exhibitions in the 2000s, although it did not formally launch a dedicated program to develop travelling exhibitions until the 2010s, with the development and growth of the program set as a major strategic goal by the museum's administration in 2019.

Notable award-winning travelling exhibitions developed by the ROM include Bloodsuckers: Legends to Leeches, which received an Overall Award in the American Alliance of Museums' Excellence in Exhibition Competition in 2020 and a Merit Award in the Society for Experiential Graphic Design's Global Design Awards in 2021. The latter recognized the exhibition's multi-sensory and immersive experiential design that combined scientific specimens with cultural themes.

The museum has pursued international collaboration for its travelling exhibitions through loans and exchanges of objects with other institutions and museum. Past exchanges include the ROM lending two Greek amphorae to the Acropolis Museum, who in return lent the ROM the sculpture Kore 670. Some travelling exhibitions developed by the ROM have benefited from the Canada Travelling Exhibitions Indemnification Program when borrowing eligible objects from other institutions, allowing the ROM to reduce its insurance costs by having the Government of Canada assume financial liability for select items.

== Accessibility ==
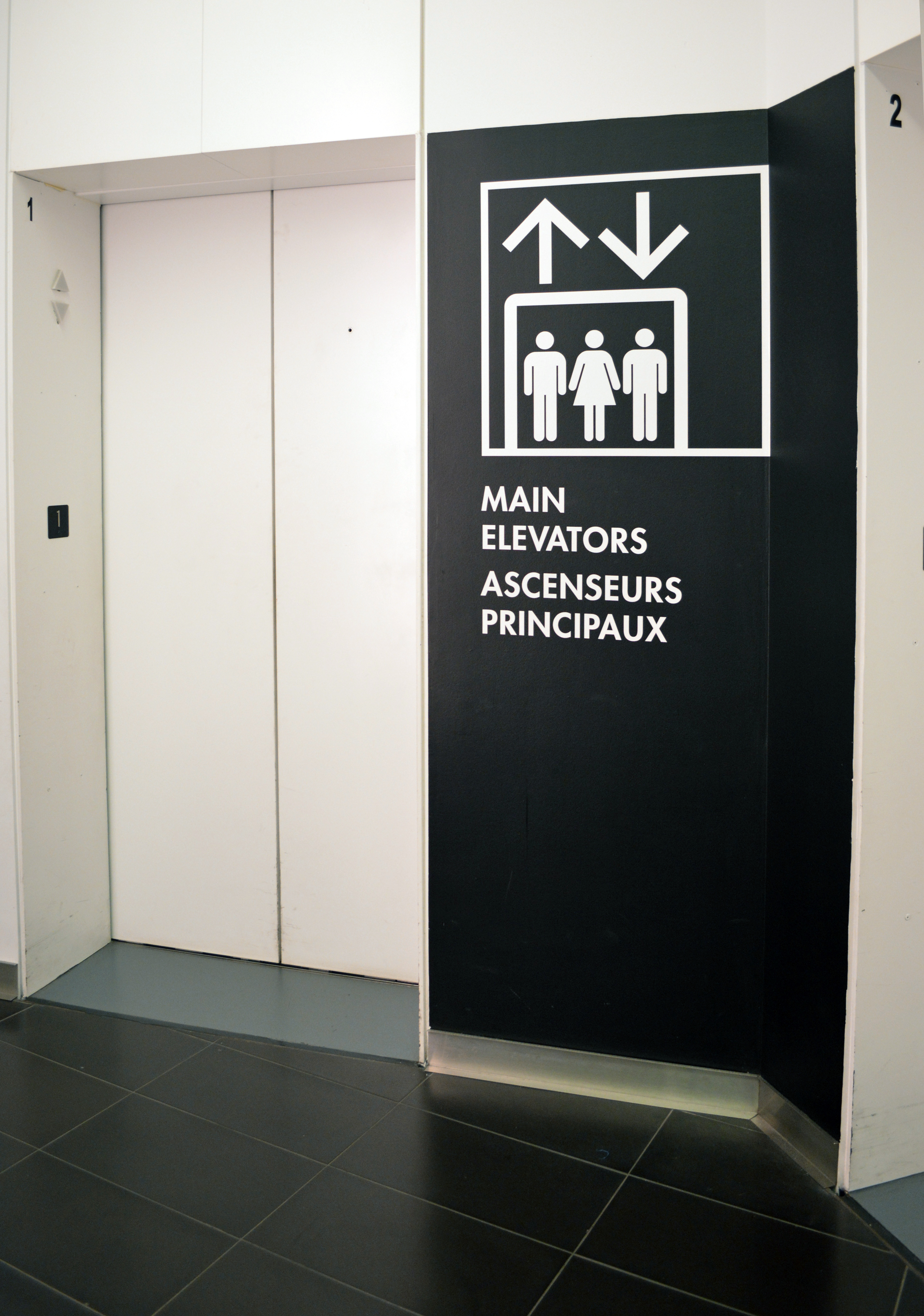
An elevator with bilingual English/French signage at the museum

The ROM provides accessibility programs and services for a wide range of communities in English and French. These include:

- Tactile tours
- An audio description program that provides descriptive narration for people who are blind or have low vision
- Tactile books featuring braille, raised line graphics, large print and colour pictures
- Large-print floor plans
- Large-print guides
- Hands-on galleries
- Gallery interpreters that provide visitors with active exploration activities
- American Sign Language interpretation, tours and video podcasts
- Interactive touch screens
- A hearing loop system
- Assistive communication technology (Ubi-Duo), which allows real-time communication between a deaf visitor and staff members

=== Community access network ===
In 2008, the Royal Ontario Museum Community Access Network was created to make the ROM more accessible to a variety of communities. it provides free general admission tickets to participating community and charitable organizations. Each year, thousands of general admission tickets are distributed to these communities. It tries to eliminate barriers that might stand between these communities and the museum. Since 2008, it has become a larger community initiative that seeks to enable learning experiences for visitors and organizations. A main goal of the program is to give the museum the power to engage, share and inspire a greater diversity of visitors by trying to break through economic and social barriers. Partners include United Way of Greater Toronto, Boys & Girls Clubs of Canada, The Hospital for Sick Children and the Centre for Addiction and Mental Health (CAMH).

== See also ==
- List of art museums
- List of museums in Toronto
- List of natural history museums
