= Shanxi architecture =

Shanxi architecture, or Shansi architecture, or Jin architecture, refers to the architectural style of the Shanxi province in northern China. Shanxi has preserved numerous ancient architectures scattered throughout the province. With 28,640 registered ancient buildings, accounting for 10.85% of the country’s total, it has given rise to the saying that "the ground cultural relics look at Shanxi". All of the three remaining wooden structures preserved from Tang dynasty in China are found in Shanxi. The old buildings of Pingyao ancient city and numerous family compounds of Shanxi merchants in the Ming and Qing dynasties are representative of the architecture styles of vernacular architecture in North China. Religious temples in Mount Wutai and Yungang Grottoes in Datong exemplify the sacred buddhist architecture in China.

== Pre-Tang architecture ==
Traditional Chinese architecture are mostly of wooden structure, yet there are no wooden architectures before Tang dynasty persevered in China. However, some grottoes and tomb paintings and other related archaeological evidences elucidate the ancient architectural styles of Shanxi before the Tang dynasty.

Yungang Grottoes in Datong illustrate rock-cut architecture dating back to the Northern Wei dynasty. Tianlongshan Grottoes in Taiyuan was constructed over a number of centuries, as early as the Northern Qi dynasty.

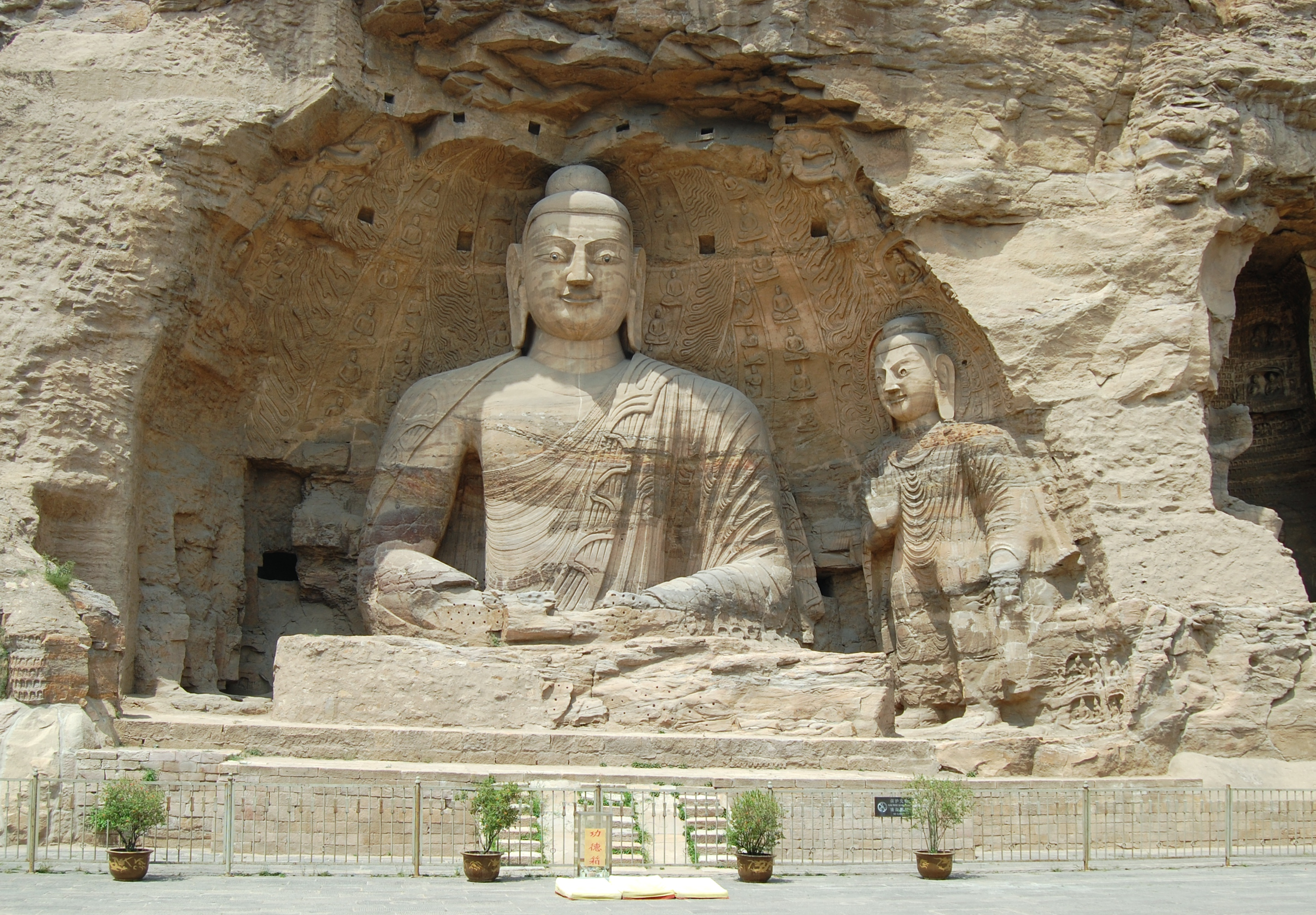
Yungang Grottoes, Datong, China

== Tang architecture ==
The oldest preserved wooden structures in China are found in Shanxi. The three preserved Tang architectures are Foguang Temple and Nanchan Temple in Mount Wutai, Five Dragons Temple in Ruicheng County.

Among these three surviving Tang architectures, Foguang Temple is the best preserved, partly due to its remote location outside of the central areas surrounded by the five mountains of Mount Wutai.

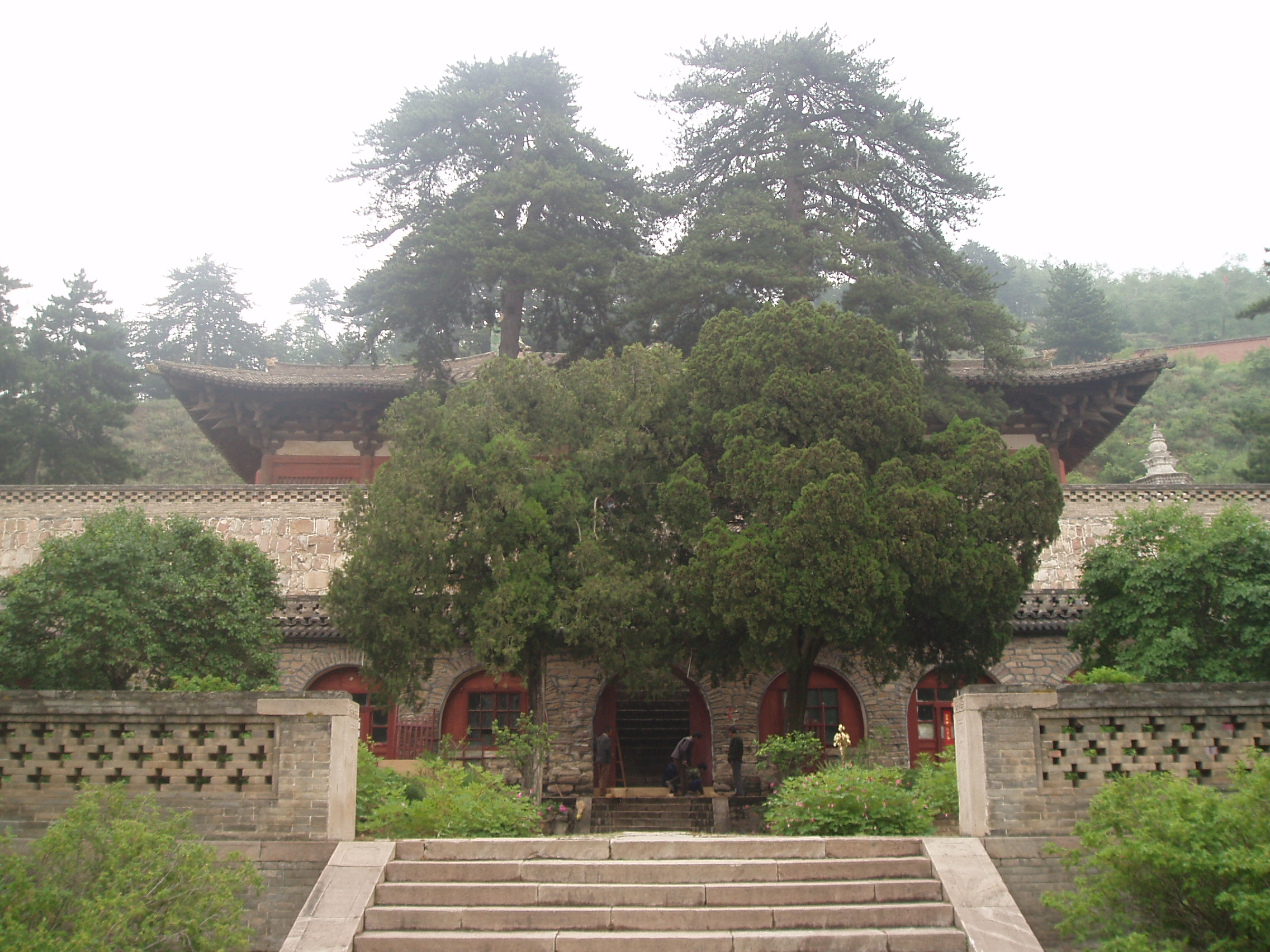
The Grand East Hall of the Foguang Temple in Mount Wutai

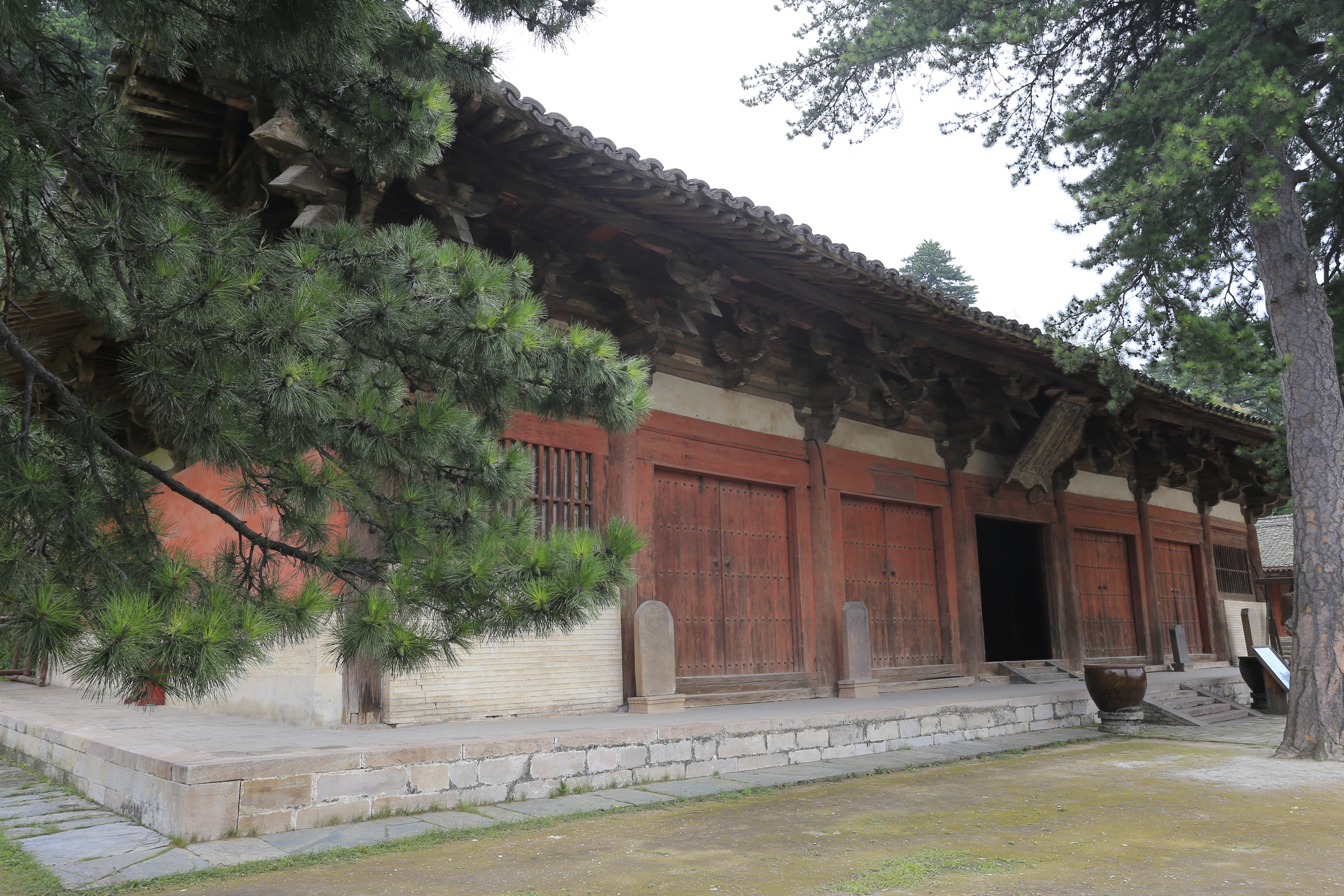
Front of the Great East Hall of the Foguang Temple

== Five Dynasties architecture ==
Tiantai Temple, Great Buddha Hall in Dayun Temple, Longmen Temple West Side Hall in Changzhi, and Zhenguo Temple Ten Thousand Buddhas Hall in Pingyao were constructed during the Five Dynasties.

== Song architecture ==
Jinci temple in Taiyuan is one of the most prominent temples in Shanxi, and the oldest surviving architecture in Taiyuan—the Goddess Temple was constructed from 1023 to 1032 during the Song dynasty.

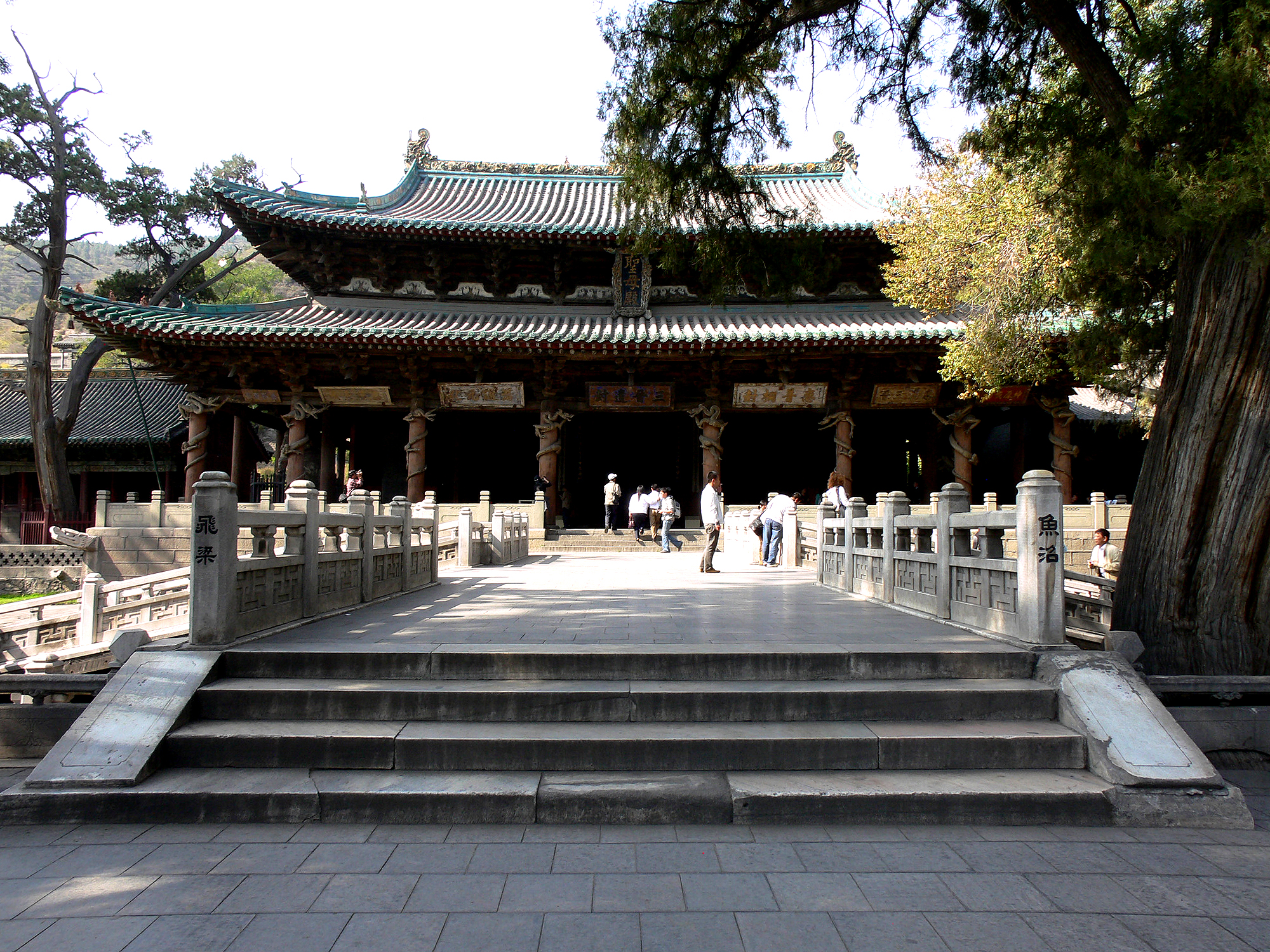
Goddess Temple in Jinci, Taiyuan

== Liao and Jin architecture ==
The Buddhist Texts Library of the Huayan Temple in Datong was established in 1038, during the Liao dynasty (907–1125). The Mahavira Hall of the Huayan Temple in Datong was originally built in the Liao dynasty, but was rebuilt in 1140 during the Jin dynasty. It is nine-room wide, five-room deep and covers an area of 1,559-square-metre (16,780 sq ft). It is the largest architecture in China built during the Liao and Jin dynasties.

The Sakyamuni Pagoda of Fogong Temple in Ying County, Shuozhou, also known as "Yingxian Muta", was built in 1056 during the Liao dynasty. It has survived several large earthquakes throughout the centuries. It is the oldest existent fully wooden pagoda still standing in China.

The Amitabha Hall and the Mahayana bodhisattva (Guanyin) Hall of the Chongfu Temple in Shuozhou were built in the Jin dynasty, which is famous for its statues and murals.

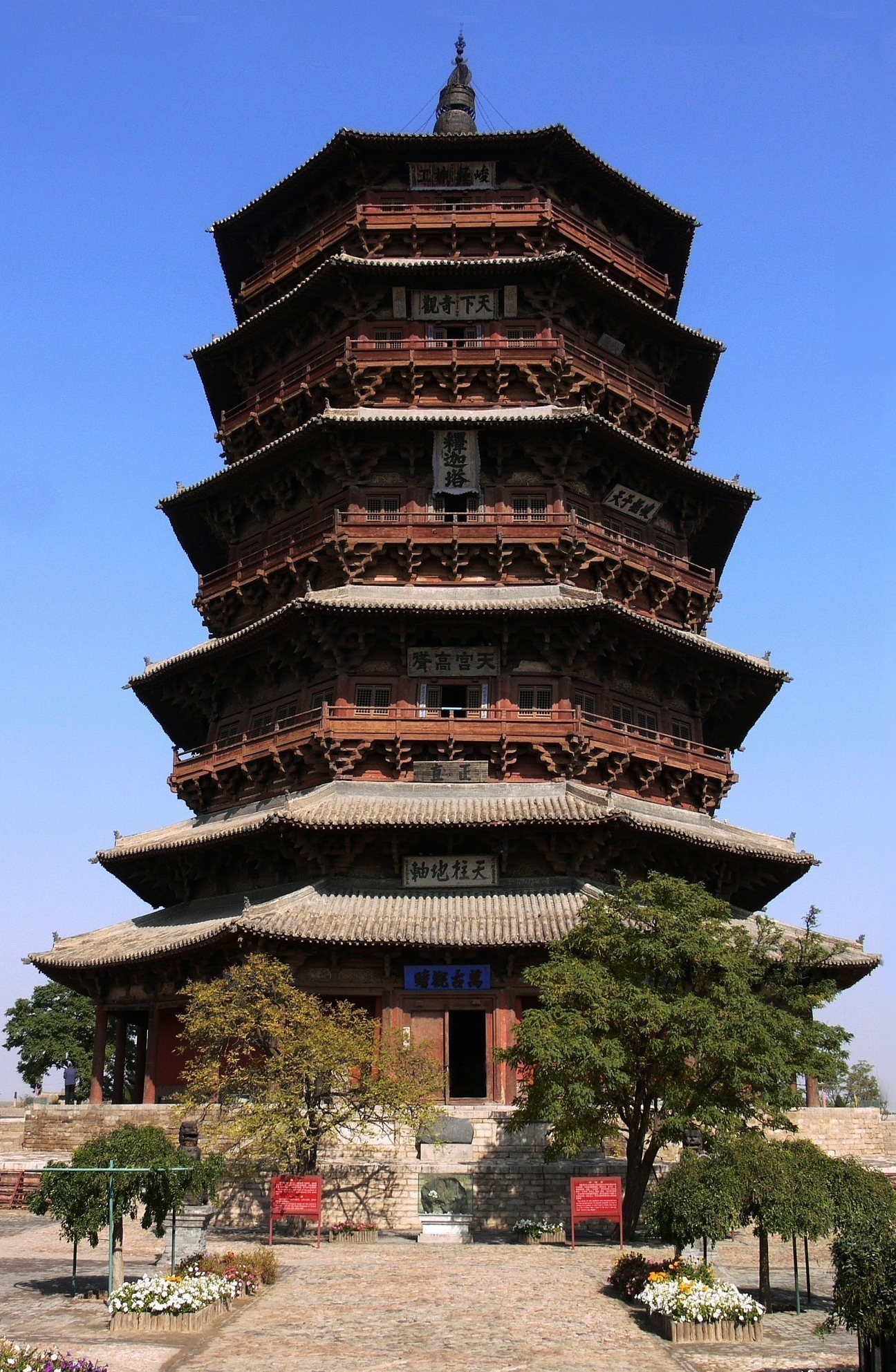
The Fugong Temple Wooden Pagoda

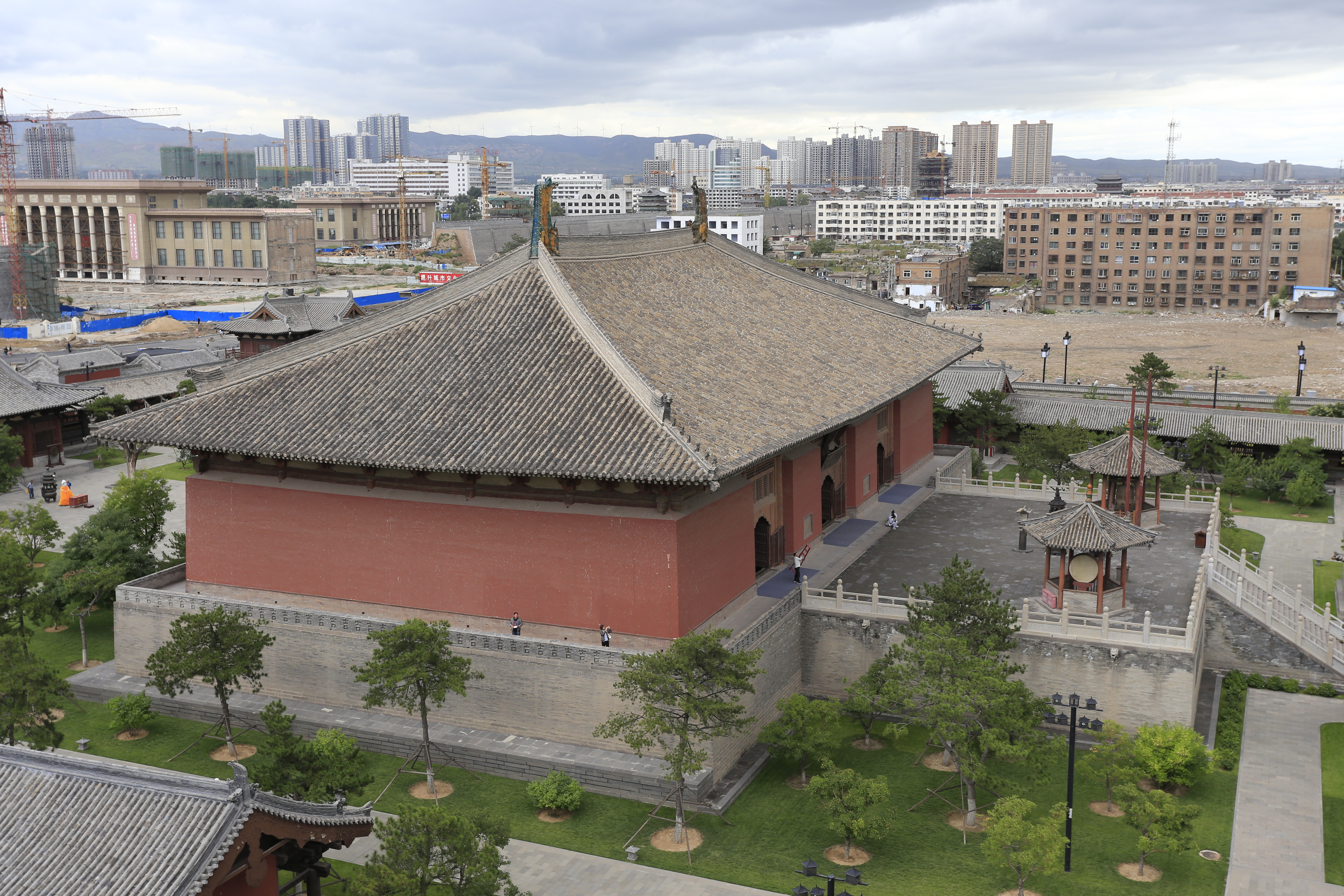
Mahavira Hall of the Huayan Temple in Datong

== Yuan architecture ==
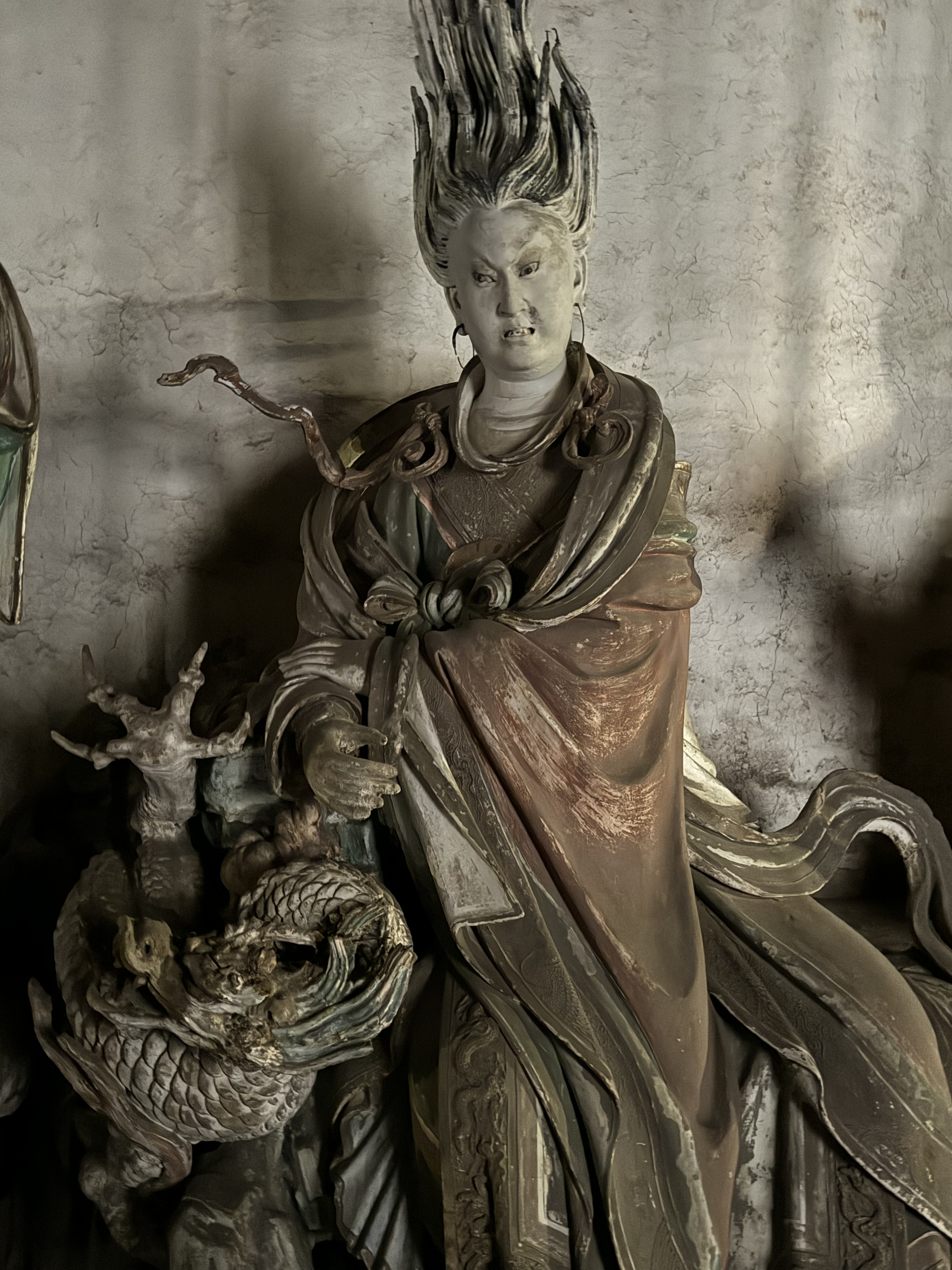
亢金龙

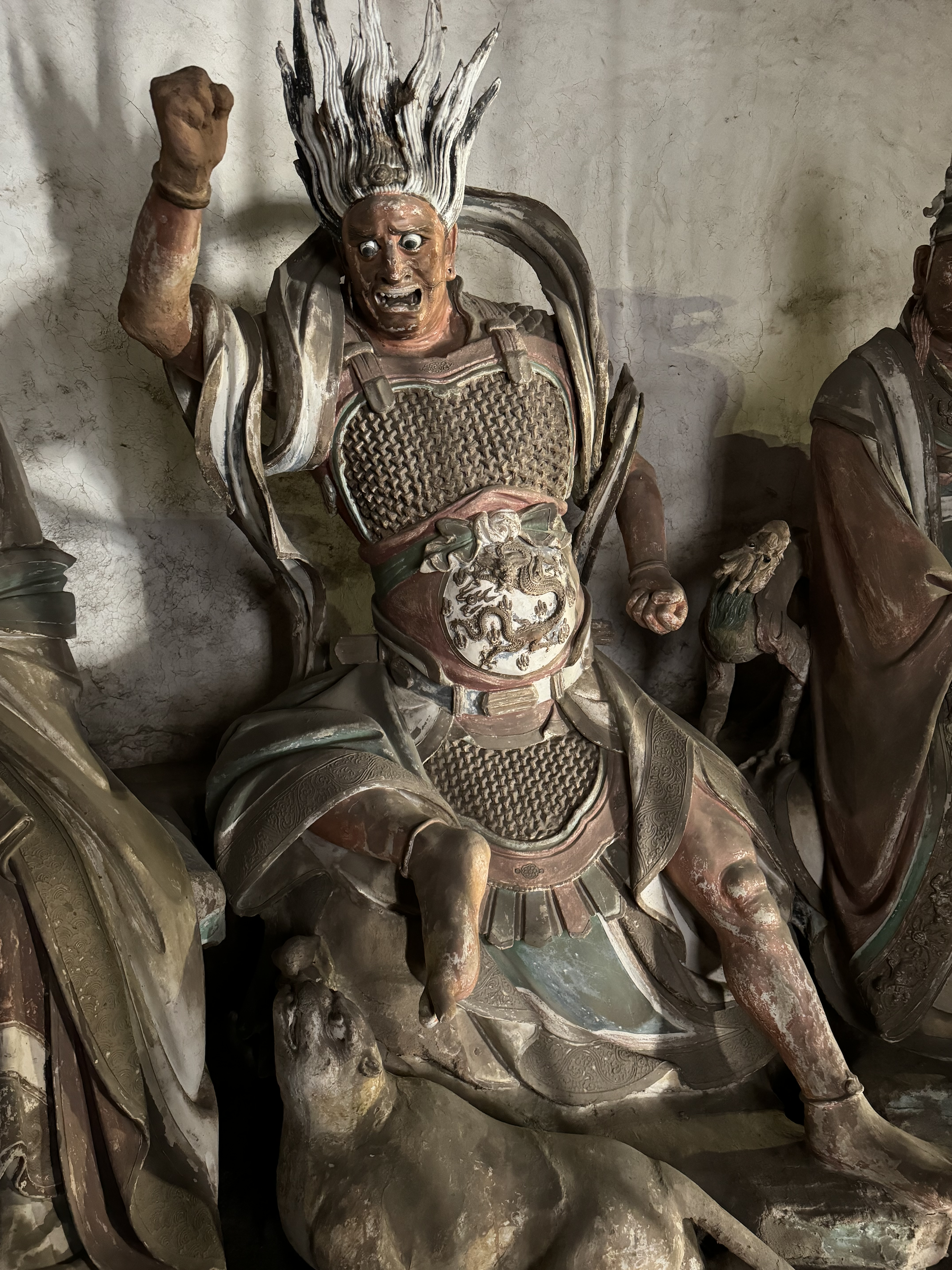
尾火虎

Yuan Buddhist temples and Taoist palaces in southern Shanxi have world-renowned sculptures and dry fresco paintings. These dry fresco paintings are mostly the works of the painting school led by Zhu Haogu. This painting school with many famous painters was very active in southern Shanxi during that historic time.

Fucheng Jade Emperor Temple in Jincheng has a collection of twenty-eight personified constellations statues by sculptors in the Yuan dynasty.

Yongle Palace in Yuncheng has preserved dry fresco murals in unparalleled integrity in China. The palace is one of "Three Great Ancestral Courts" of the Quanzhen School of Taoism. The "Homage to the First Principle" (Chaoyuan tu) on the walls of the Yongle Palace are the largest mural paintings of Yuan dynasty in China.

Some of these Shanxi mural paintings are now preserved in western museums. For example, Paradise of Bhaisajyaguru was originally housed in Guangsheng Lower Monastery, now in Metropolitan Museum of Art, New York, United States; Homage to the First Principle, which depicts a procession of Daoist deities and their celestial attendants, sometimes referred to as Chaoyuan tu or the ‘Heavenly Court’, similarly in style as those found in the Yongle Palace, was originally housed in Wansheng Guan in Linfen (then-named Pingyang Fu (平阳府)). Paradise of Maitreya was originally housed in the Xinghua Temple of Xiaoning, Jishan County, Shanxi. Both paintings are now in the Royal Ontario Museum (ROM) of Toronto, Canada. However, the Wansheng Guan and the Xinghua Temple were both completely destroyed during the tumultuous second world war and Chinese civil war periods. Some of the fresco paintings are preserved.

Longshan Grottoes in Taiyuan is the only grottoes site dedicated for Taoism in China.

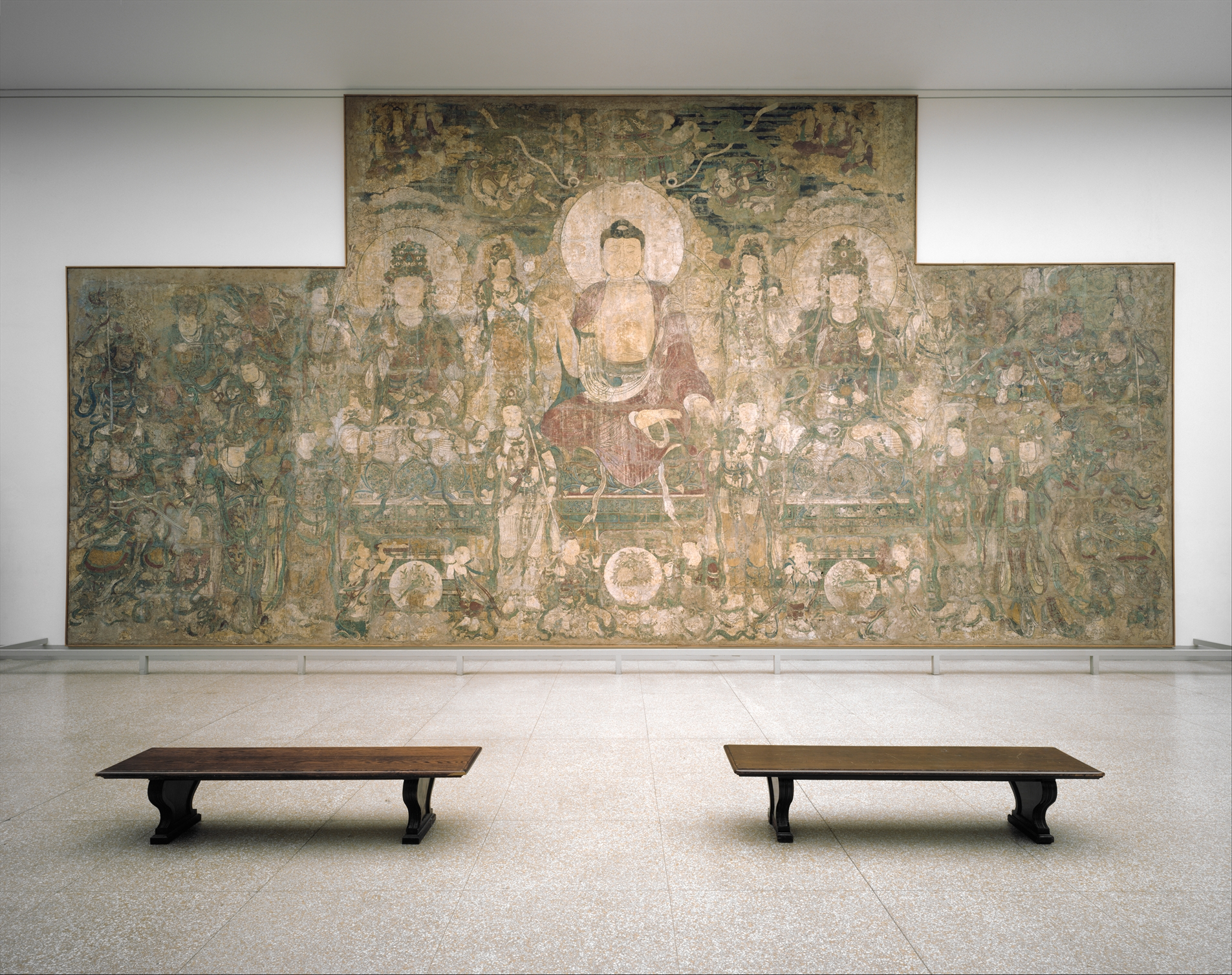
Pure Land of Bhaisajyaguru (Yaoshi fo). This dry fresco was originally housed in Guangsheng Temple. Currently in Metropolitan Museum of Art, New York, United States

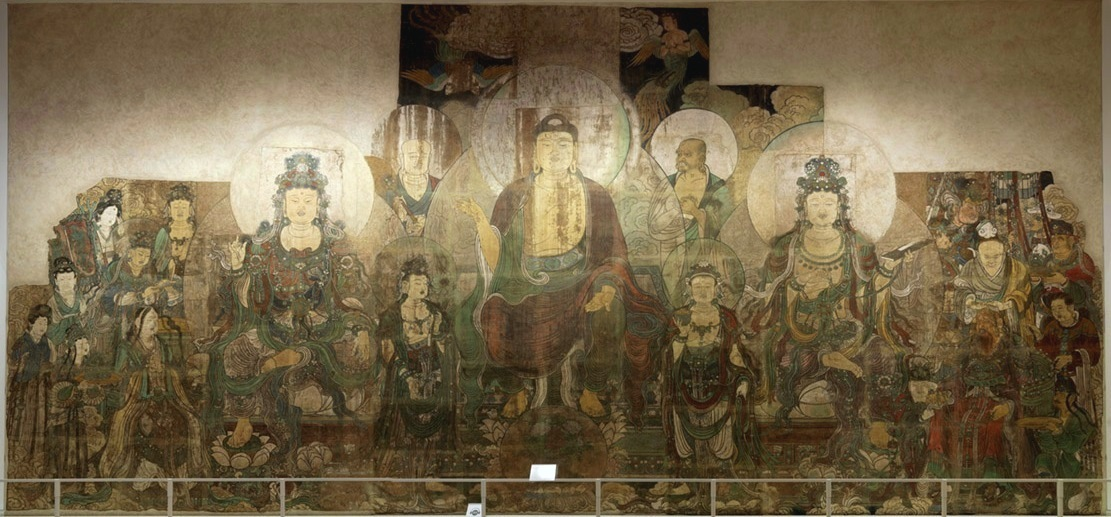
The Paradise of Maitreya, originally in Xinghua Temple, Shanxi. ca. 1320. Royal Ontario Museum, Canada

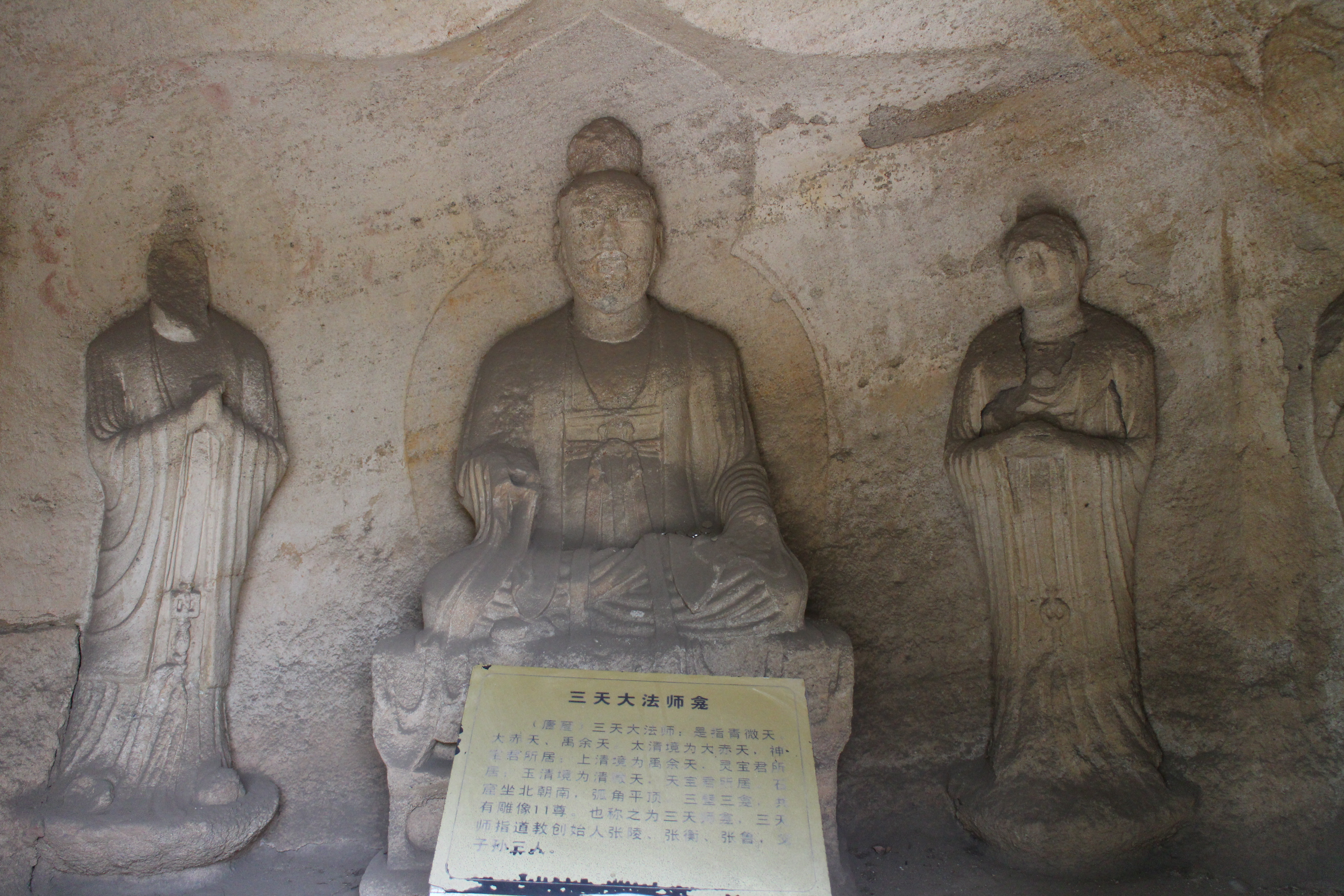
Longshan Grottoes of Taoism in Taiyuan

== Ming and Qing architecture ==
During the Ming and Qing dynasties, the Shanxi merchants accumulated enormous wealth, particularly through the international trade of tea to Russia and the development of draft banks, or "Piaohao", which secured Shanxi as the financial center in the Qing dynasty.

Pingyao ancient city is a well-preserved city with numerous ancient architectures. There are also a number of family complexes scattered throughout Shanxi that were built during these two dynasties, which are representative of vernacular architecture in North China. The notable Shanxi family complexes include:

- Wang Family Compound in Lingshi, which is the largest of the Shanxi Courtyard Houses;
- Qiao Family Compound in Qi County;
- Qu Family Compound in Qi County;
- Chang Family Compound in Yuci;
- Cao Family Compound in Taigu;
- The Kung Family Residence in Taigu, where the family of H. H. Kung used to live;
- The Meng Family Courtyard in Taigu, later, this private family compound was transformed to the Ming Hsien school (铭贤学校), which is further incorporated as part of Shanxi Agricultural University;
- Shen Family Compound, (申家大院) in Changzhi.
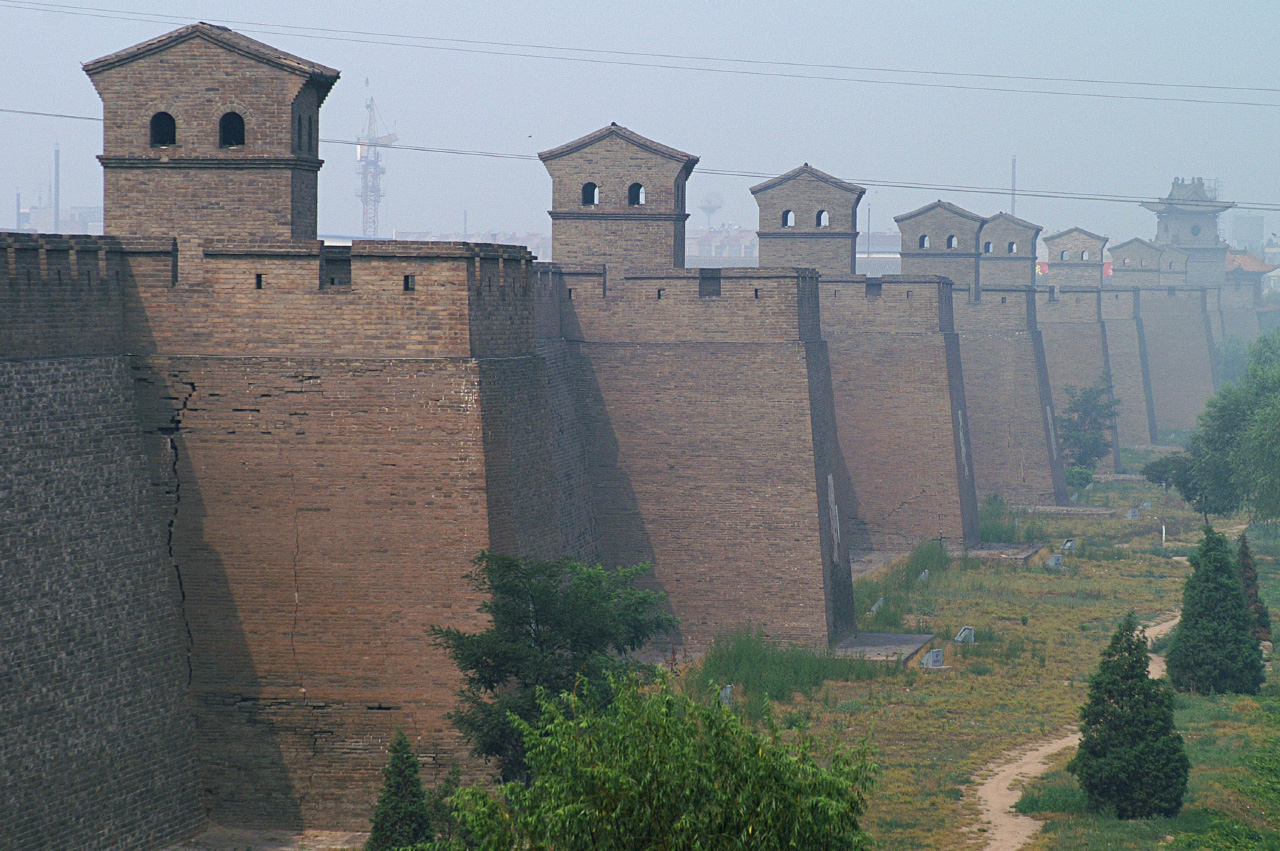
Pingyao City Wall

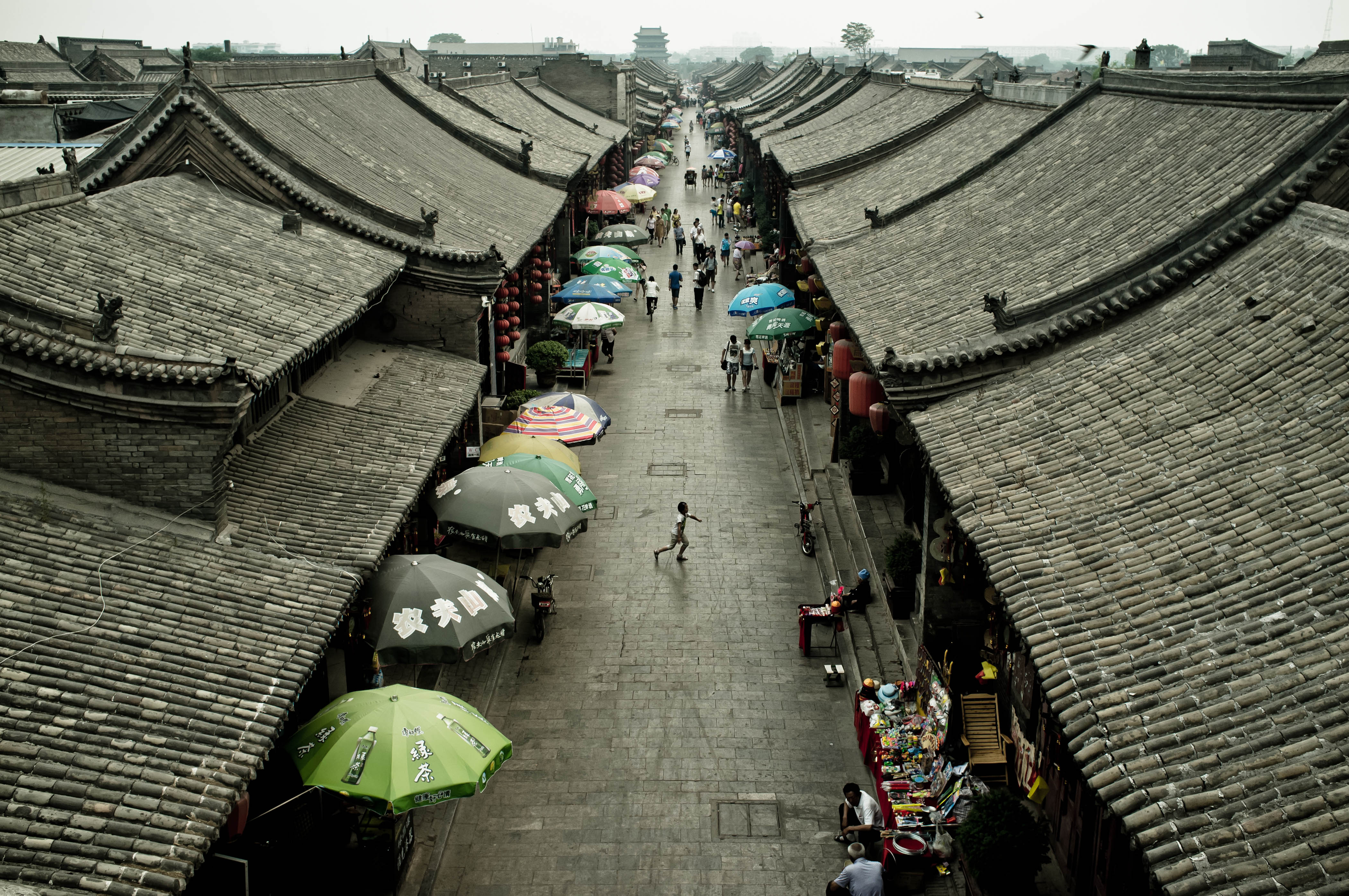
A market street in Pingyao ancient city

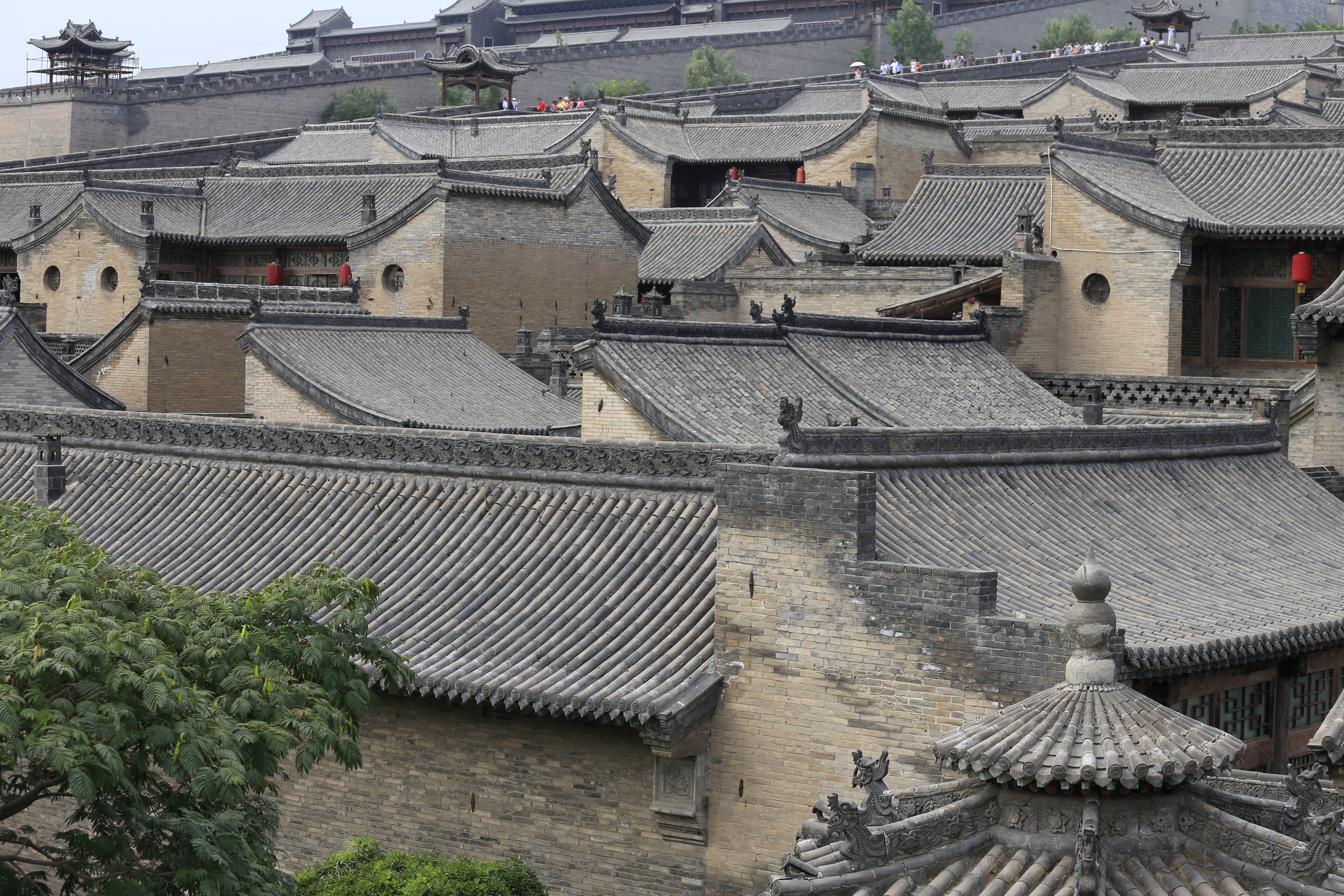
Wang Family Compound in Lingshi

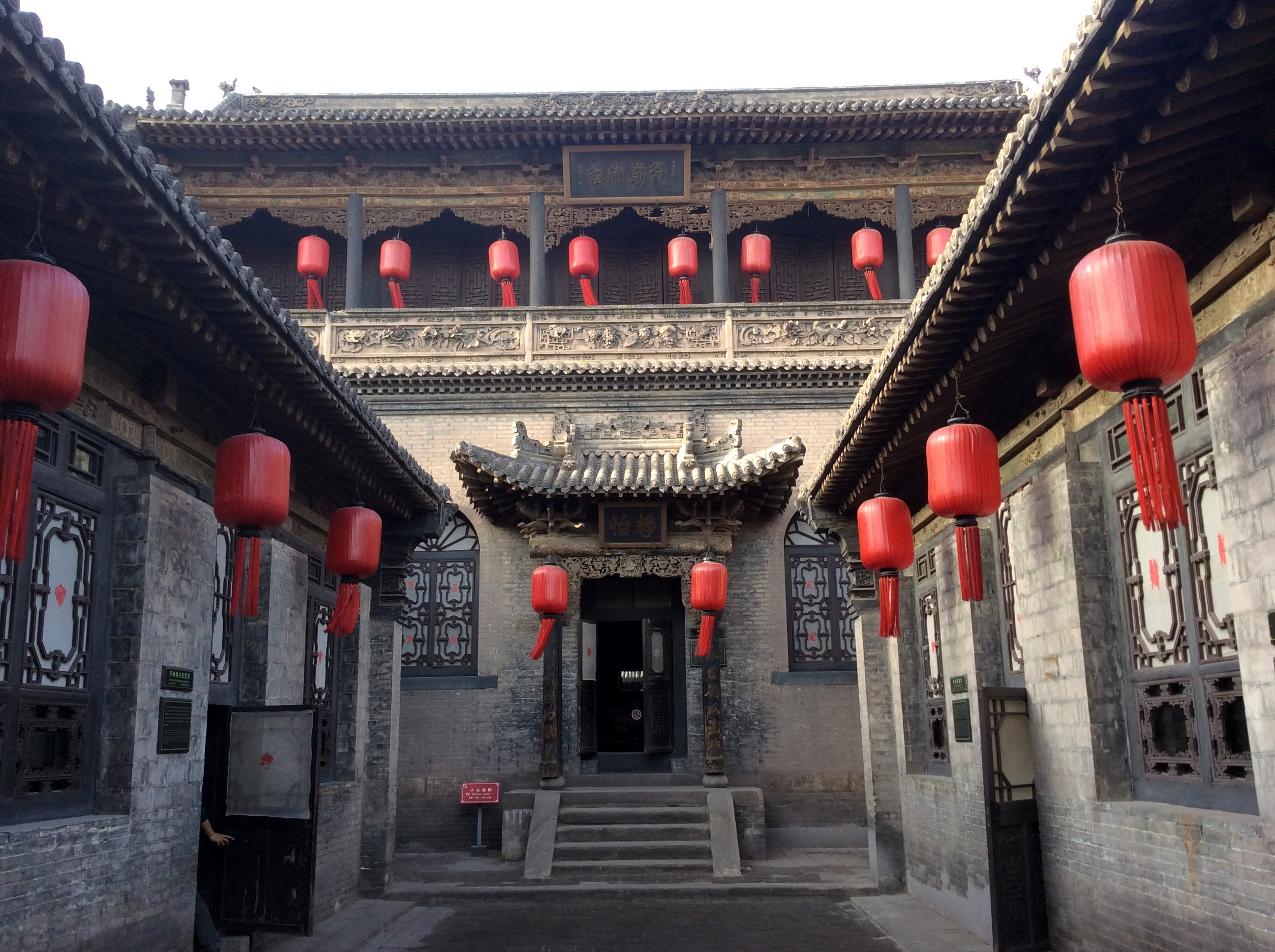
Qiao Family Compound, Jingyi Court in Qi County

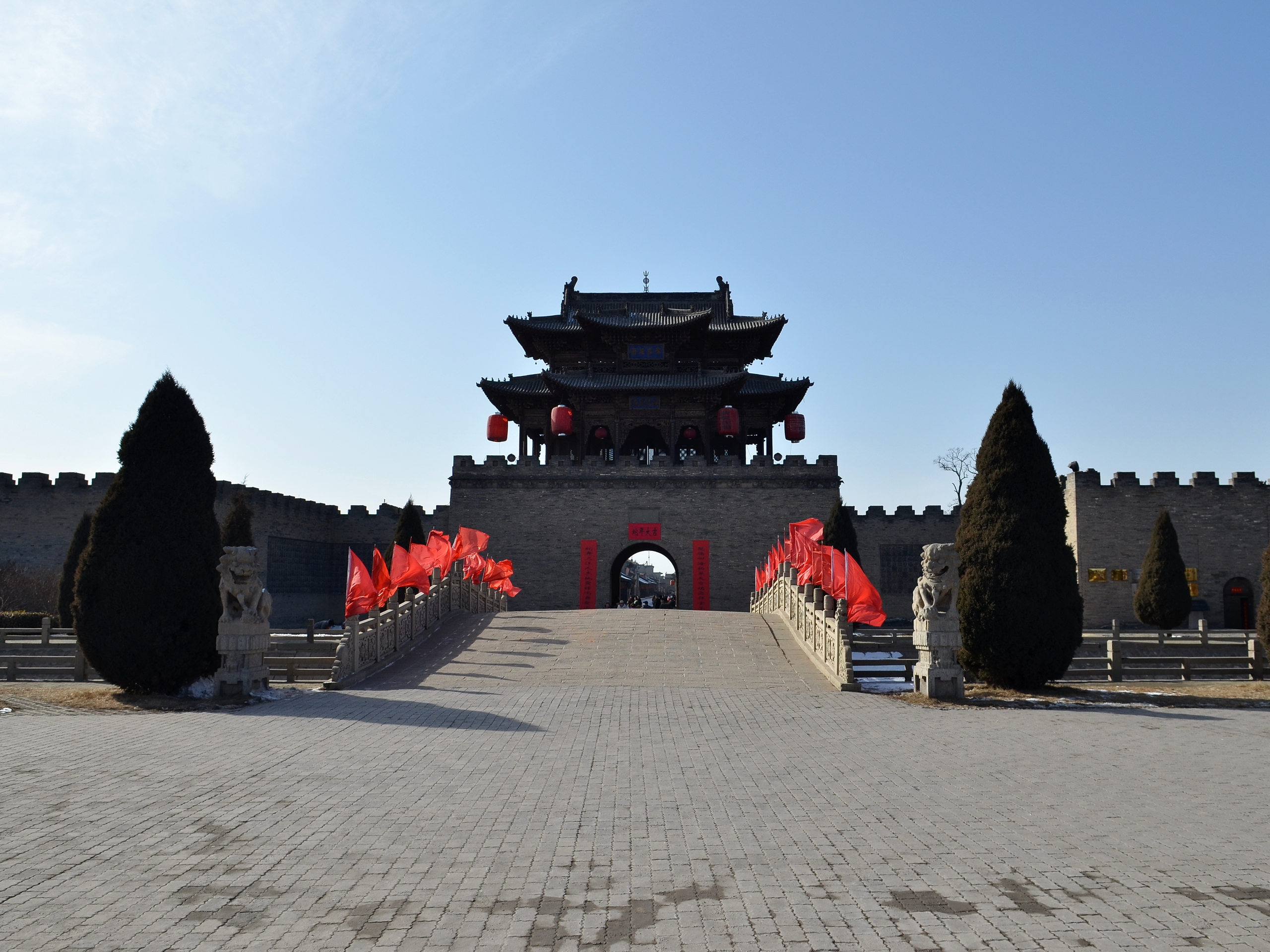
Chang Family Compound main gate, Yuci

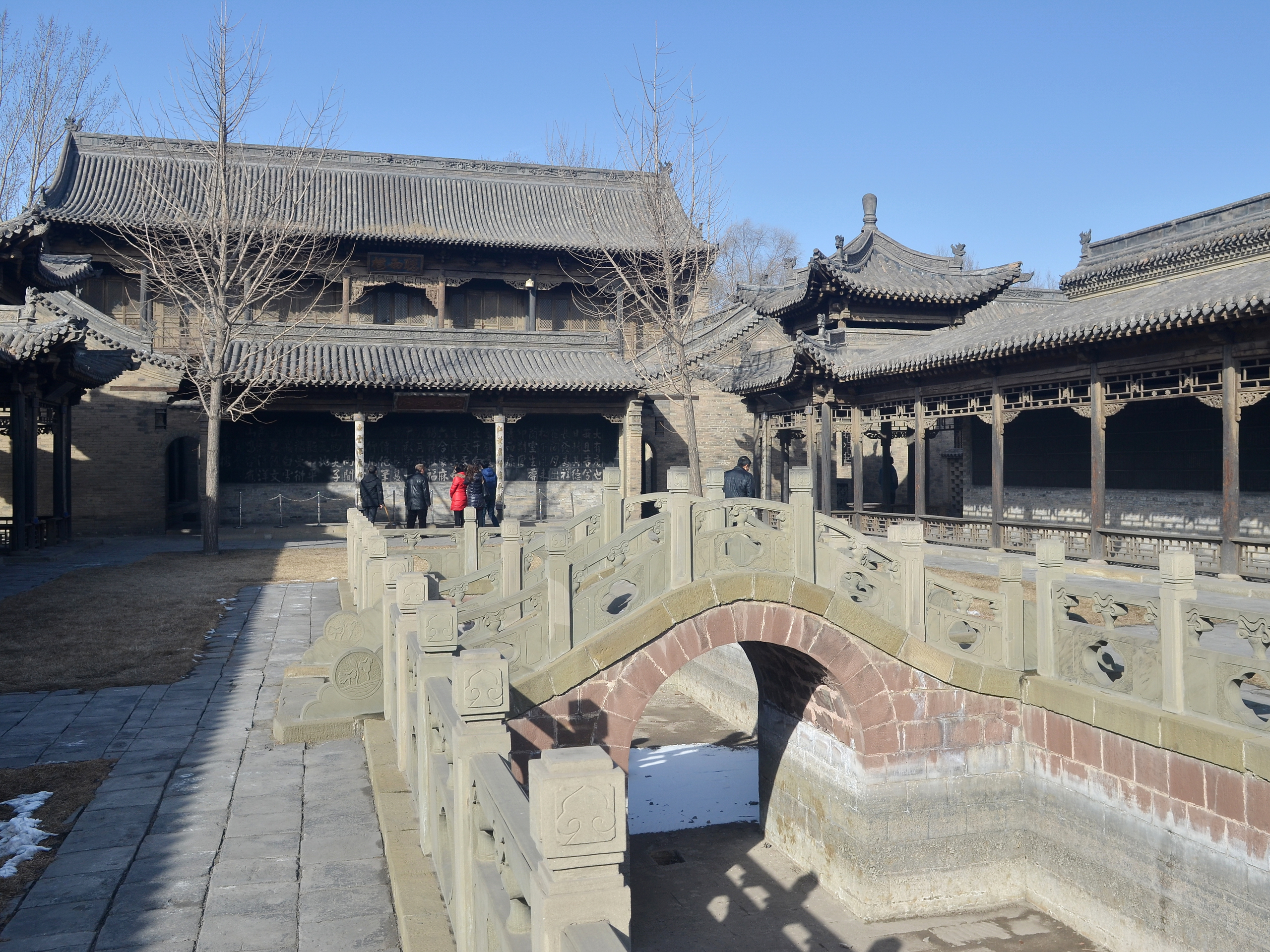
Chang Family Studies, Yuci

== Religious architecture ==
Other than the Yungang Grottoes and Tianlongshan Grottoes as two notable religious architectures, Mount Wutai has the largest concentration of buddhist architectures in Shanxi, with temples constructed throughout thousands of years from the Tang dynasty to modern days.

In Southern Shanxi, Qinglian Temple in Jincheng, and Guangsheng Temple in Hongtong County are among the most notable religious architectures.

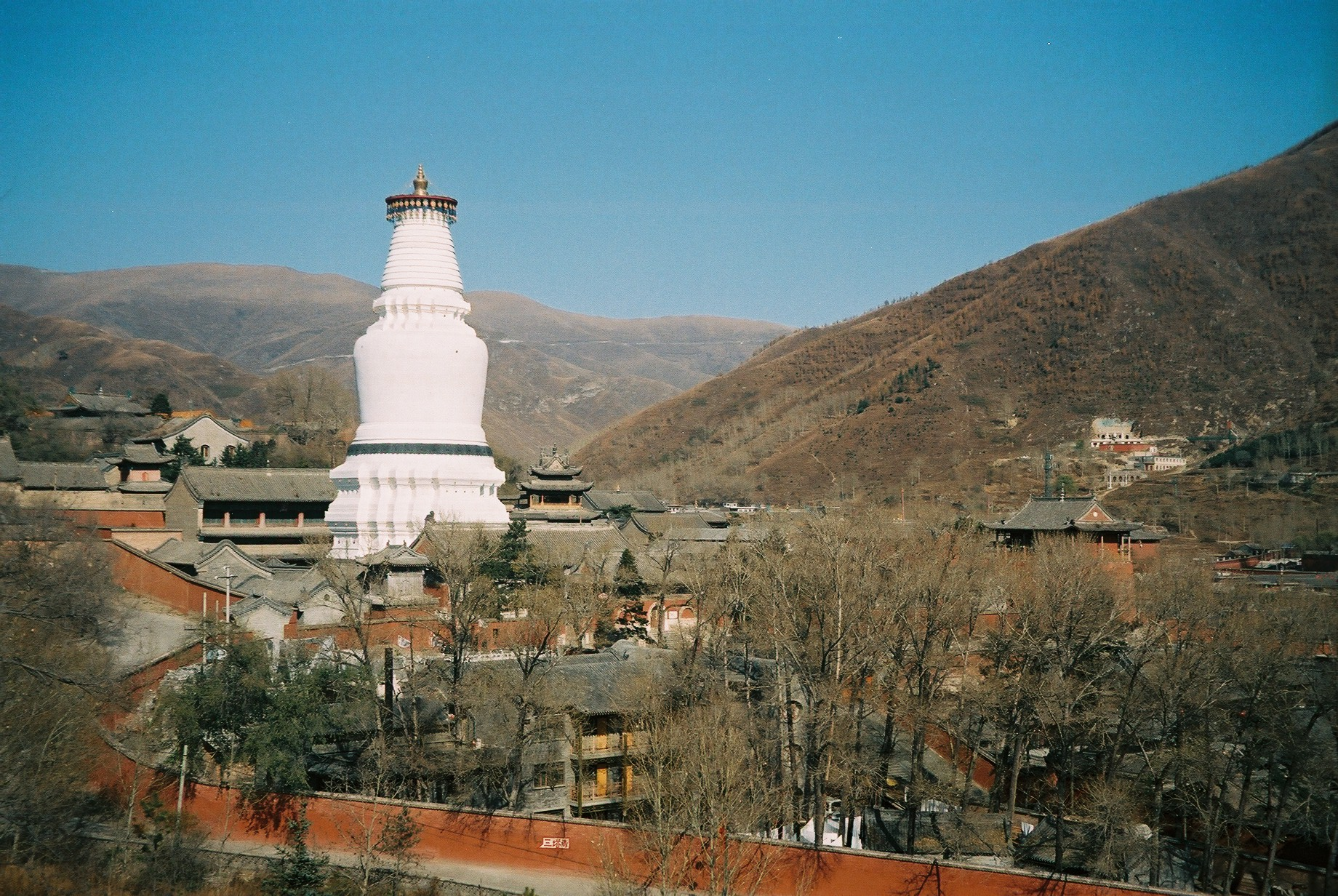
Mount Wutai

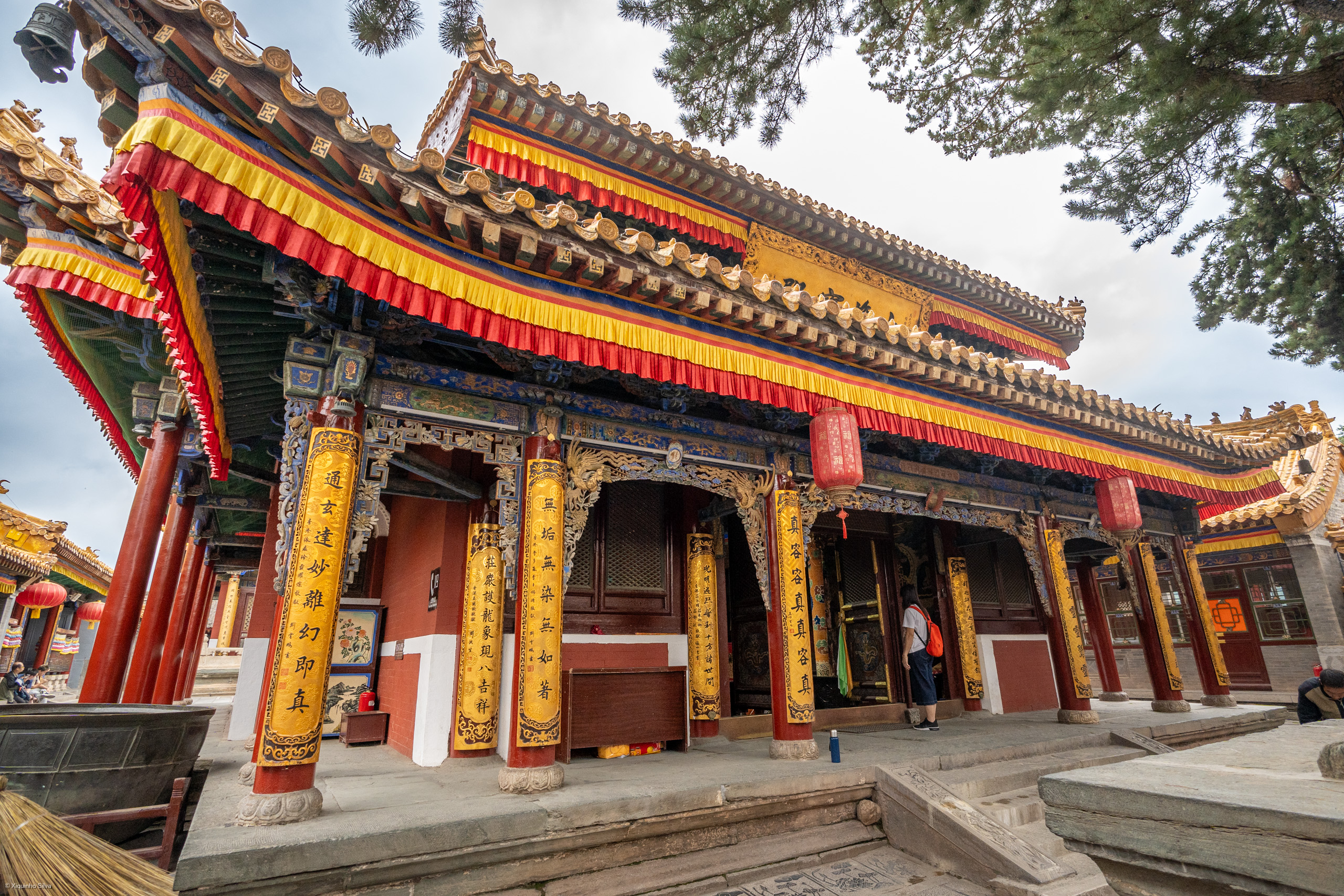
Mahavira Hall of Mount Wutai

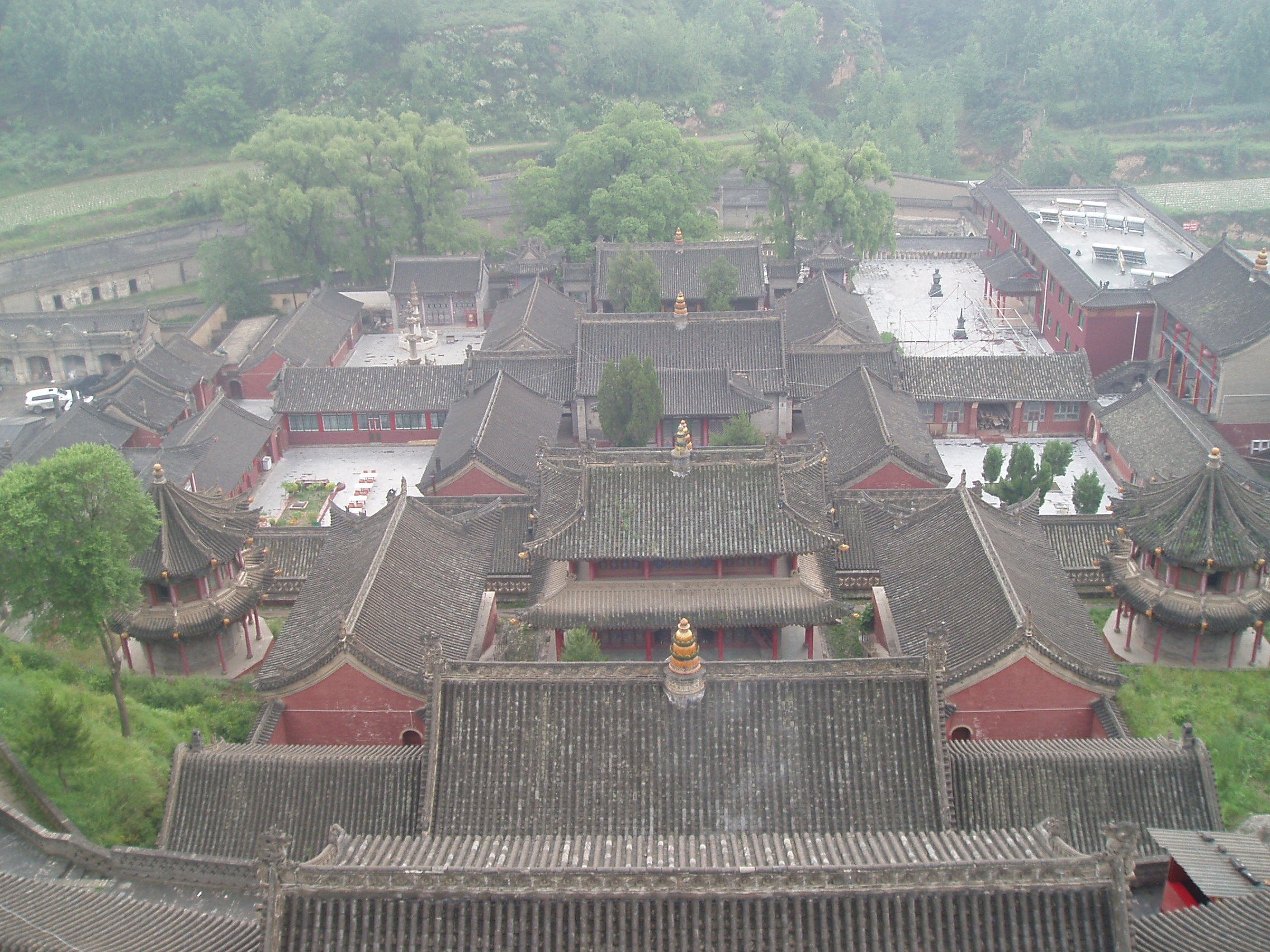
Birdview of the Zunsheng Temple

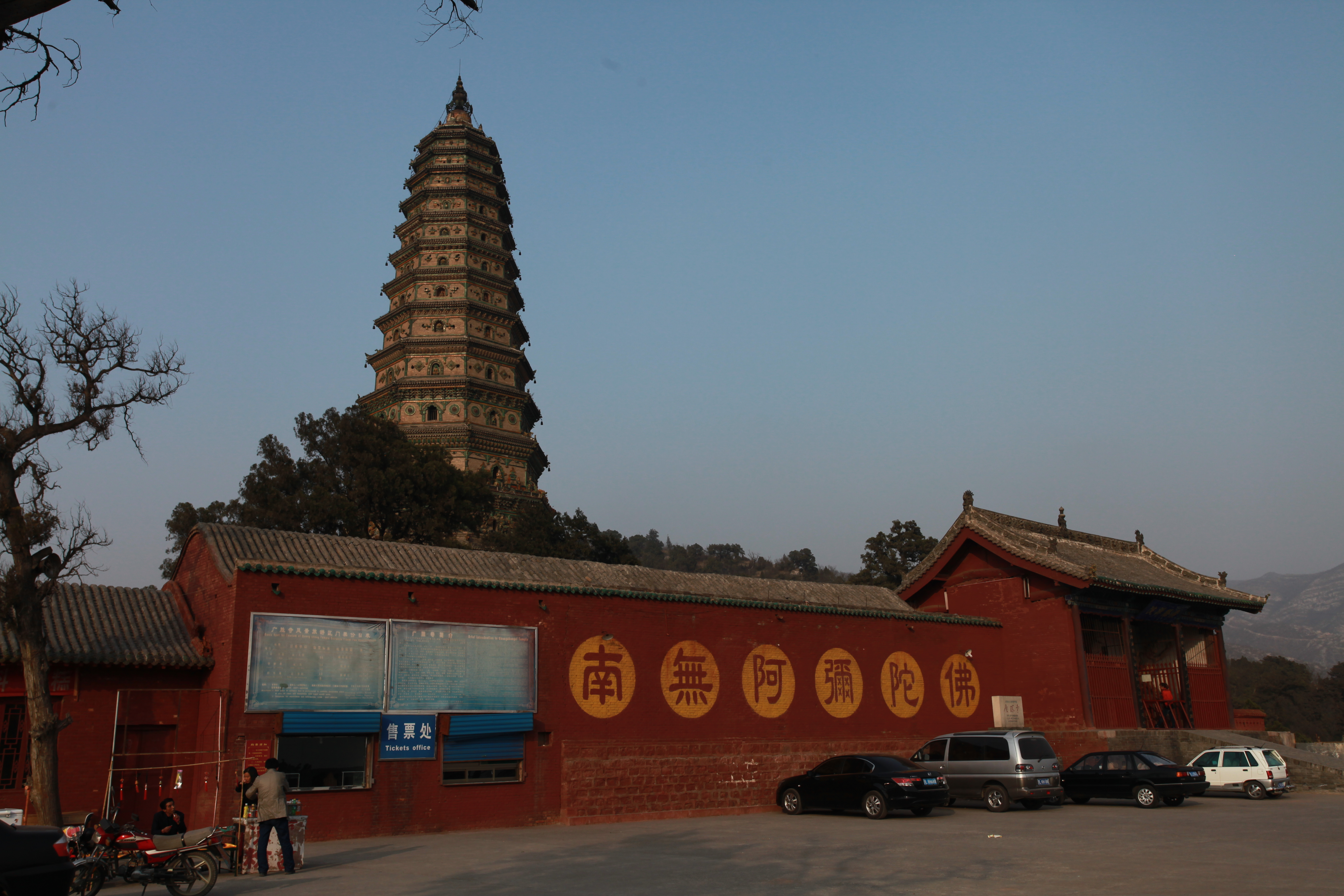
Guangsheng Temple in Hongtong

== Yaodong ==
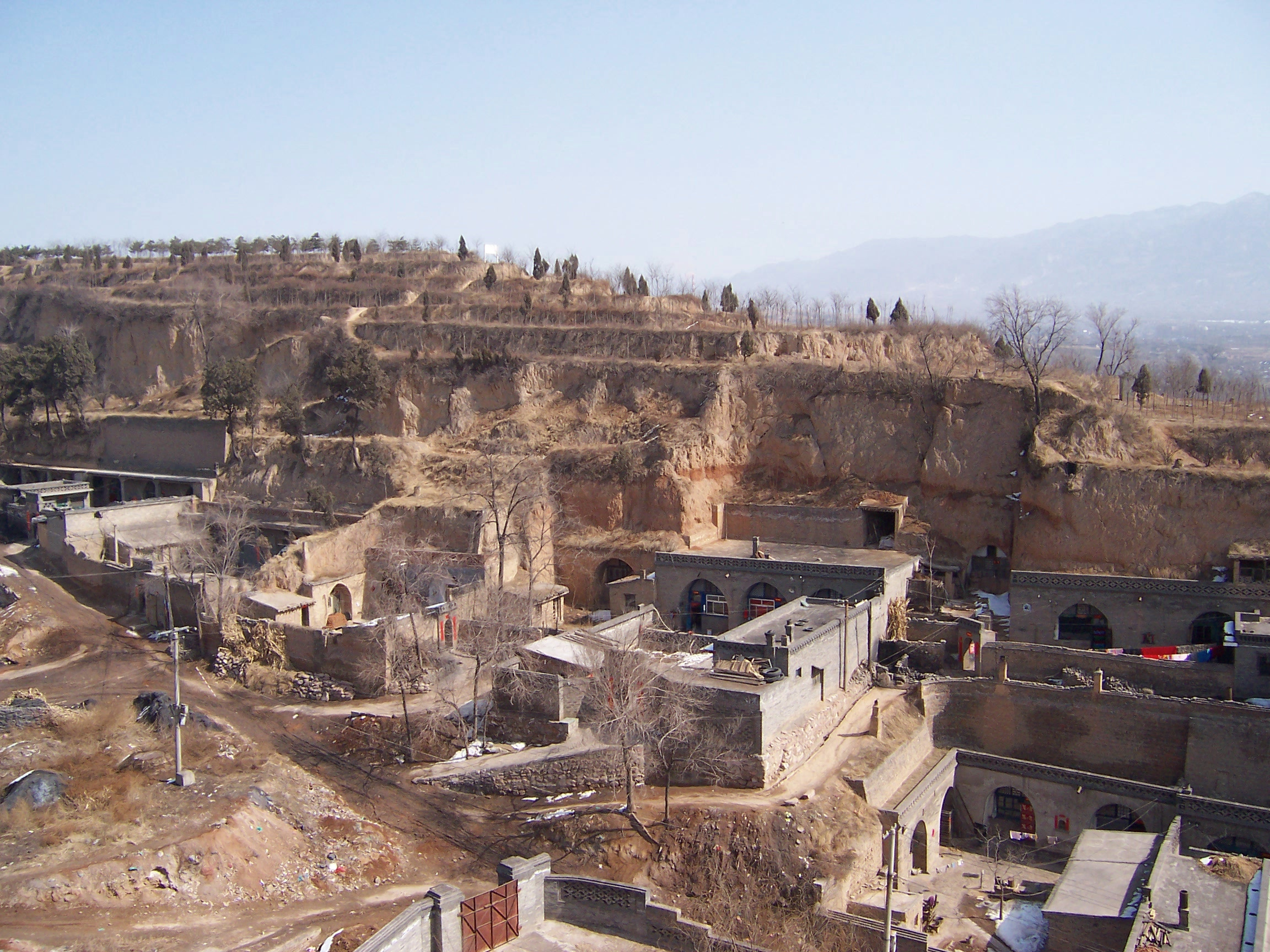
Yaodong in Lingshi County, Shanxi

Yaodong is a special form of vernacular architecture, commonly found in the Loess Plateau in North China. Yaodong are commonly seen in the mountainous areas of Shanxi, in contrast to the more elaborate aforementioned family compounds, which are usually found in flat plains or basins of Shanxi.

Yaodong is a type of earth shelter, usually carved out of a hillside. Sometimes, Yaodong can be found in relatively flat areas with the entire central courtyard dug out from the flat land, and then the rooms are carved from the surrounding walls. The earth shelter serves as a good insulator and keeps the indoor space cool in hot summers and warm in cold winters.
