= Bishop White Gallery of Chinese Temple Art =

The Bishop White Gallery of Chinese Temple Art is one of four galleries in the Royal Ontario Museum (ROM) that are dedicated to Chinese art and archaeology. It contains one of the most important collections of Chinese temple art in the world, including three Yuan Dynasty (1271 – 1368 AD) temple wall paintings from Shanxi Province that adorn the three walls of the Gallery, and several wooden sculptures depicting bodhisattvas from the 12th to the 15th centuries. These are some of the earliest acquisitions and most iconic objects in the ROM.

== Name of the Gallery ==
The Gallery is named in honour of Bishop William Charles White (1873-1960), an Anglican missionary, educated at Wycliffe College in the University of Toronto, who became Bishop of Honan Province, China (1909-1934). Bishop White was chiefly responsible for building and interpreting the ROM's Chinese collection in the early days and, in particular, for the acquisition of the Buddhist wall painting on the north wall of this Gallery and the H.H. Mu Far Eastern Library .

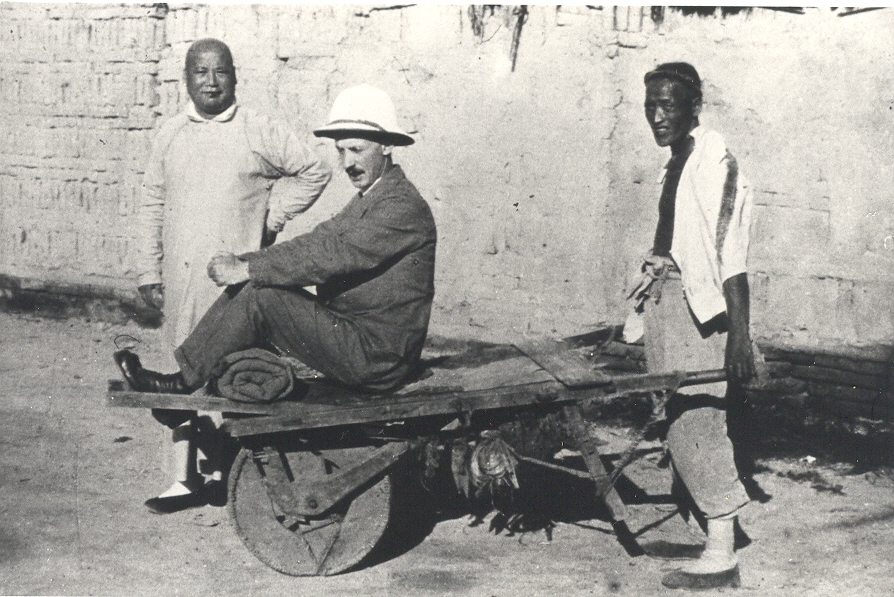
Bishop White in China

He was also the first curator of the East Asian galleries (1934-1948) and founder of the School of Chinese Studies (later the East Asian Studies Department) at the University of Toronto in 1934. The Bishop White Committee in the Royal Ontario Museum was founded shortly after his death to promote the collections of the East Asian Galleries.

== Contents of the Bishop White Gallery ==
The collections of this Gallery are mostly Buddhist, including the wall painting on the north wall of the Gallery, The Paradise of Maitreya, and the wooden sculptures, which are mostly of a later provenance; but the other two wall paintings, both entitled Homage to the First Principle, are from the Daoist tradition.

=== The Paradise of Maitreya (1298 AD) ===
The wall painting depicts Maitreya, the Buddha of the future and successor to the historical Buddha, enthroned in heaven and awaiting his incarnation on earth where he will save the souls of lost humanity. Maitreya himself is the central figure but he is joined by a goodly retinue of greater and lesser bodhisattvas and monks (arhats, or 'luohan' in Chinese). According to the Indian Buddhist tradition, Maitreya will be born in to the Kingdom of Ketumati, whose King and Queen are depicted here, at the far left and right, 'taking the tonsure' (i.e., having their heads shaved) as a sign of their conversion to Buddhism.

The Paradise of Maitreya, which measures approximately 16 (height) x 36 (width) feet, is known to have come from the Monastery of Joyful Conversion (Xinghua Si) in southern Shanxi Province, which has long since been destroyed after falling into ruins. The painting remained in situ and was undisturbed until the 1920s, when social and political unrest in China led to the destruction of many temples in the northern part of the country. To protect the wall paintings from war lords who were looting the northern monasteries, the Buddhist monks resolved to cut the painting in to 63 sections and hid them. They eventually sold the painting in 1923 to a syndicate of Chinese art dealers from Beijing from whom Bishop White purchased it in 1928 for the Royal Ontario Museum where it was installed in 1933 after being reassembled. It was acquired through the generosity of the Sir Joseph Flavelle Foundation, in memory of Sir Joseph Flavelle, a prominent Toronto businessman and Trustee of the ROM.

The Paradise of Maitreya is currently dated as having been composed in 1298 and is one of the best surviving examples of its kind from late Yuan period, but there has been much scholarly debate about the exact date of composition. Bishop White himself contributed a monograph on the subject, arguing for a slightly earlier date, and suggesting that the painting should be attributed to Zhu Haogu, whose name Bishop White procured from the temple records before it was destroyed. This attribution has been accepted by subsequent scholars and has been a useful point of reference for research into the development of a Buddhist-Daoist style of temple art in southern Shanxi Province.

=== The Sculptures (12-15th Centuries) ===
These Buddhist sculptures are bodhisattvas, enlightened beings who have remained on earth rather than entering paradise in order to help others attain enlightenment. These sculptures also come from Shanxi Province, though not from the same temple as the Paradise of Maitreya, and were intended as icons by which to evoke the presence of the divine, with the wall paintings serving as a background. The most famous of these are a pair of bodhisattvas, Guanyin and Dashiji, who are almost identical except for some of their accoutrements, like the diadems they wear. Their creation is attested as being in the year 1195 by an inscription set into the lower back of Guanyin, which makes them unique, as only a very few wooden sculptures of this kind dated to the 12th century are known to have survived. Many of the sculptures in the Bishop White Gallery have openings in their backs where devotees would leave offerings (e.g., printed prayers, small images or precious gems and metals) at the time of dedication to ensure their efficacy as objects of prayer.

Bishop White surmised that most of the statues in this Gallery were sculpted from a variety of catalpa, either in pieces or from a single block. All of these sculptures were acquired through the efforts of George Crofts, a fur merchant who was also instrumental as an agent in the Chinese art market of the early 20th century, and arrived to the ROM before 1925.

=== Homage to the First Principle (1271 - 1368 AD) ===
On the east and west walls of the Bishop White Gallery are a pair of two slightly smaller paintings, Homage to the Highest Principle, that depict a procession of Daoist deities and their celestial attendants, sometimes referred to as Chaoyuan tu or the 'Heavenly Court'. These deities, whose court is modeled on the bureaucratic structure of the earthly world, are said to maintain the order of nature and to govern the welfare of human beings. In their original monastic context, these processional paintings would have led up to a great picture at the end of the room, probably depicting the heavenly host. In the Bishop White Gallery, the north wall is occupied by the Paradise of Maitreya, a Buddhist painting but with a similar motif and treatment of the subject matter as what would have been seen in the original Daoist temple. By the time that these paintings were being produced in the 13th or 14th century, Buddhism had been assimilated into the Chinese philosophical system, and this syncretism had long since begun to influence iconography.

The provenance of these paintings, which both measure approximately 10 (height) x 34 (width) feet, is not known with certainty. It is thought that they came from a Daoist temple in southern Shanxi, whose name and exact location are unknown, but the stylistic similarity between these and other paintings found in another Shanxi Daoist temple, Yongle Gong, suggests that they might have come from the same workshop and be roughly contemporaneous, dating from the early 14th century. Since the paintings in Yongle Gong bear the inscription of the master Zhu Haogu, the same painter whom Bishop White first identified as being responsible for the Paradise of Maitreya, it has been inferred that all three wall paintings in the Bishop White Gallery, both Buddhist and Daoist, might have been executed by the same man or, at least, in the same workshop.

The Daoist murals were acquired through the well-known art dealership of Yamanaka & Co. in 1937. Charles Currelly, the founding Director of the ROM, relates in his autobiography how the paintings were offered to the Museum by a certain Mr. Tanaka, who, being particularly impressed by the quality of the Buddhist wall painting already in the ROM's possession, thought it desirable that the pair of Daoist paintings should also come to the ROM, so that there would be in North America at least one complete representation of what these early Northern Chinese temples would have been like.

== Design of the Bishop White Gallery ==
The Bishop White Gallery is located in the original wing of the ROM, constructed in 1914, where it has remained since the wall paintings were installed in the 1930s. The design of the Gallery, however, has changed dramatically over the years, beginning with a fairly prosaic display of the objects around the circumference of the room, later progressing in the 1980s to a recreation of an authentic temple setting and, since the mid-2000s, receiving a more modern treatment with an 'open concept' layout.

In the early 1980s, the Bishop White Gallery was redesigned to give the effect of a Chinese Buddhist temple of the 14th century. This was not an attempt to reproduce a particular site but rather a thoughtful way of utilizing the space to combine a number of roughly contemporary artefacts into a coherent unit. This was done by imitating a few features of what remains from the Yongle Gong temple complex, long roof beams terminating in curved brackets and a coffered ceiling, together with the same general layout of a rectangular space where devotees could participate in rituals such as meditative circumambulation around a raised altar supporting sculpted images of bodhisattvas. The choice of a temple environment was appropriate not only thematically, since both the wall paintings and the statues were originally used as temple art, but also in terms of the provenance of these artefacts, which originated in geographic proximity to each other in northern China. It might be objected that the contents of this Gallery are not exactly contemporaneous, dating from 1195 to the late 14th century, but yet it would not have been uncommon for a temple to contain devotional objects that its community had accumulated throughout many generations. Although the wall paintings displayed in this 'temple' setting are both Buddhist and Daoist, it was decided that this too would not be inappropriate, because there had long since been a blending of these two religious belief systems. Indeed, from the 10th century onwards the syncretism of Buddhist, Daoist and Confucian beliefs – 'The Three Teachings' - was reflected even in the similarity of artistic style, which is certainly evidenced in the examples presented in the Bishop White Gallery. The renovated Gallery was reputed to be as close as one could come outside China to a major North Chinese monastery hall.

== Present Design ==
The current incarnation of the Gallery, which opened in 2005, dates from the renovations that were undertaken during the first phase of the 'Renaissance ROM' building project. Several other galleries were also renovated, including the other galleries of the Far Eastern collection, and the construction of the Michael-Lee Chin Crystal, designed by Daniel Libeskind, was completed in 2007. Like the Crystal, the renovation of gallery space in the historic buildings was also intended to be modern in style - quite austere, with a minimum of colour and helpful signage, and an 'open-concept' layout that minimizes visual barriers between adjoining galleries, purportedly so that audiences might appreciate the collections as 'works of art,' with little indication of the context for which objects – particularly religious objects – were originally intended. That said, the general organization of the artefacts remains much as it was during the Gallery's previous incarnation as a temple reconstruction, with the murals surrounding the wooden sculptures situated in the middle of the space, but the decorative elements of the temple setting have been stripped away to focus one's attention on the objects themselves.
