= Paradise of Maitreya =

Yuan Dynasty wall painting by Zhu Haogu

The Paradise of Maitreya
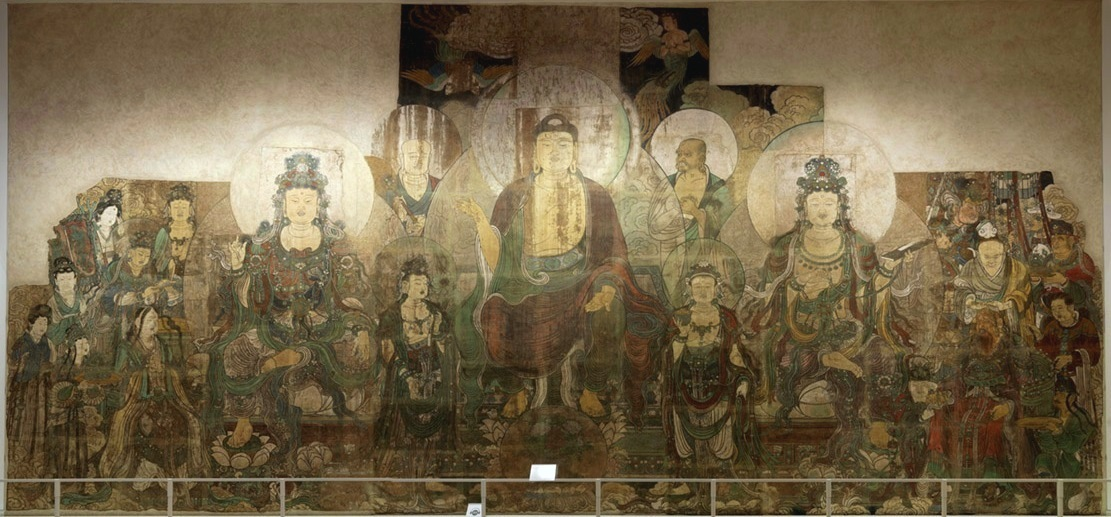
- Artist: Zhu Haogu (and pupil Zhang Boyuan)
- Year: Yuan Dynasty (exact date unknown)
- Type: Dry Fresco
- Dimensions: 502 cm × 1101 cm (198 in × 433 in)
- Location: Royal Ontario Museum, Toronto

The Paradise of Maitreya (Chinese: 彌勒佛說法圖) is a wall painting created by Zhu Haogu during China's Yuan Dynasty. The painting was originally housed in the Xinghua Si Temple of Xiaoning, Shanxi. During the 1920s and 1930s, it was disassembled and moved to the Royal Ontario Museum (ROM) of Toronto, Canada, where it remains today. Museum officials have undertaken a series of restorations to preserve and stabilize the painting. Currently, it can be found in the museum's "Bishop White Gallery of Chinese Temple Art" as part of the Far Eastern Collection and is described as one of its must-see Iconic Objects.

The painting features the Bodhisattva Maitreya, a future Buddha who is foretold to appear on Earth in order to help humans achieve enlightenment through the teachings of dharma.

== Composition ==
As it stands today, the wall painting measures 502 cm in height and 1101 cm in length and has a symmetrical composition, notable for its high level of detail. It features Buddha Maitreya in the centre of an imagined heaven, surrounded on both sides by monks and the ruling king and queen. Although Buddha Maitreya is commonly depicted as an Indian figure, all of the characters in The Paradise of Maitreya are found to be wearing Chinese robes and clothing.

The piece foretells the coming of the Buddha Maitreya, who is said to appear on Earth in its darkest hour to save humanity from samsara. The royal family depicted in the painting is gathering the first assembly; leading 84,000 newly converted followers into salvation. Both the king and the queen have bald, shaven heads, which, in Buddhist culture, represents turning towards enlightenment and nirvana.

== Creation ==
The famed painter and Buddhist monk, Zhu Haogu (朱好古), along with his pupil Zhang Boyuan (張伯淵), created the dry fresco painting on the southwestern portion of the Xinghua Si (興化寺) monastery during China's Yuan dynasty. To prepare the monastery wall for this type of painting, it was covered first with a mudded layer of clay, followed by a layer of straw and additional layer of clay, giving the surface a workable texture. From there, a light carbon ink and colour pigments were used to create the image, which would have been copied from a smaller-scale version.

== Movement ==
During the 1920s, the various armies of the Chinese warlords would often plunder small villages in search of valuable goods. Fearing The Paradise of Maitreya was in danger of theft, the monks of Xinghua Si removed the work from the wall and partitioned it into 63 pieces so that it could be securely stored and hidden in Taiyuan. While the painting survived the plundering, it faced environmental threats from fire and drought in its new location. Instead of allowing the work to undergo further degradation, the monks began approaching art dealers, hoping to sell it.

In 1928, Anglican Bishop William White (Bishop of Honan) heard of the sale and proceeded to purchase the painting. Over the following 5-year period, the piece was shipped from Taiyuan to Tianjin, then taken via American Express to Boston, and from there was taken to Toronto and the Royal Ontario Museum by train.

== Restoration at the Royal Ontario Museum ==
While the painting suffered notable damage following its removal from the Xinghua si monastery, restoration efforts made by the ROM have led The Paradise of Maitreya to become one of the best preserved pieces from the Yuan dynasty.

=== Initial restoration ===
Restoration on the piece commenced in 1933 with structural treatment to reassemble the 63 panels the painting was partitioned into. During the work's movement, a significant amount of degradation had occurred, causing loss and disfigurement. After the initial restoration was completed, George Stout mounted the painting on the north wall of the ROM's Bishop White Gallery. It was placed on Masonite panels developed at the Fogg Art Museum using a polyvinyl acetate resin.

=== Renaissance ROM ===
As part of a museum-wide restoration effort put on by the ROM in 2005, The Paradise of Maitreya received further attention addressing surface and structural issues. Plastazote LD45 was used to undertake general breakdowns in the joint material of the Masonite panels for its flexibility and imperviousness to humidity.

== Dating ==
While The Paradise of Maitreya arrived in the ROM in 1933, it wasn't until 1940 when Bishop William C. White became the first to propose a date for the painting. A team of students commissioned by White discovered the painting appeared to bear an inscription dictating it was completed on the 14th day of the mid-autumn moon of qingshen. White believed this gave an age that was too young for the painting and that his students had therefore interpreted the inscription incorrectly. Instead, he believed the inscription read the painting was completed in wuzu, not qingshen, which he claimed would date it to be from 1238.

Ludwig Bachhofer later researched the painting and found an additional inscription quoting “da Yuan guo” (the great Yuan state). As this title was not used in Yuan until 1271, it made the painting's date of 1238 inaccurate. He agreed that the painting bore the inscription wuzu, not qingshen, however, as these characters were reused on a 60-year cycle, he instead believed the term wuzu was referring to the year 1298.

=== Controversy ===
As most of the painting's inscriptions were not transported to the ROM from China and the Xinghua si monastery fell to ruins in 1938, it is impossible to get a full record of the painting's background information. Both White and Bachlofer made assumptions in their findings and as such, neither has been able to make a full claim on the painting's date. As such, The Paradise of Maitreya remains the most controversial painting from the Yuan dynasty.

== See also ==
- Paradise of Bhaisajyaguru
