= Paradise of Bhaisajyaguru =

Yuan dynasty fresco

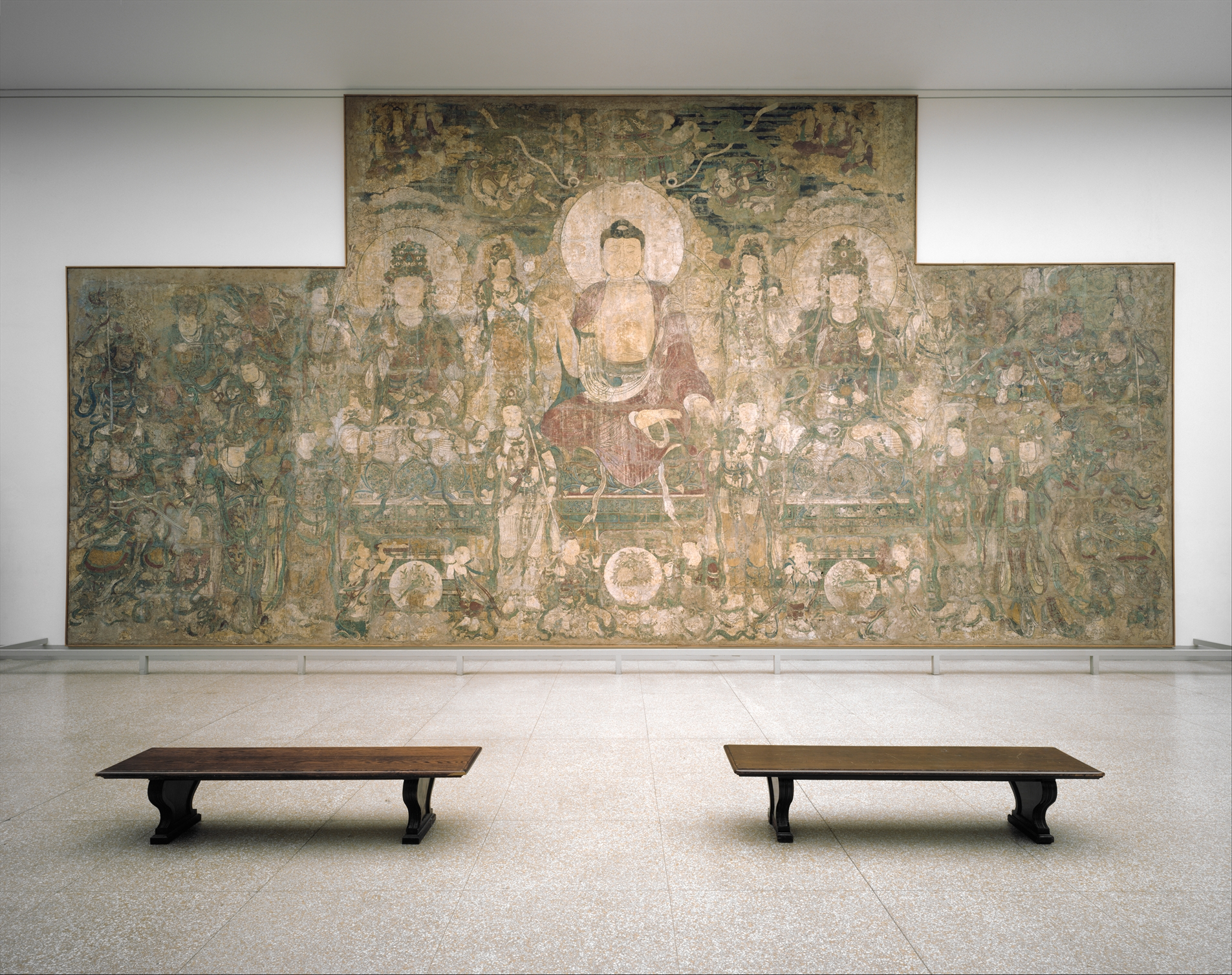
- Year: Yuan dynasty (ca. 1319)
- Type: Dry Fresco
- Dimensions: 751.8 cm × 1511.3 cm (296.0 in × 595.0 in)
- Location: The Metropolitan Museum of Art, New York

Paradise of Bhaisajyaguru (藥師佛) or Pure Land of Bhaisajyaguru is a painting created during China's Yuan dynasty. This painting was originally housed in Guangsheng Lower Monastery (Guangsheng Si), Zhaocheng County, Shanxi. The painting, which was at the eastern gable wall of the Main Hall of the monastery, was purchased by Arthur M. Sackler and later was given to Metropolitan Museum of Art, New York, United States in 1954.

This painting features the Bhaisajyaguru Buddha and two Bodhisattvas, Avalokitesvara and Cintamanicakra in the centre. Traditionally Bhaisajyaguru Buddha (Yaoshi fo) is considered the Buddha of medicine (both physically and spiritually) in Mahayana Buddhism.

== Composition ==
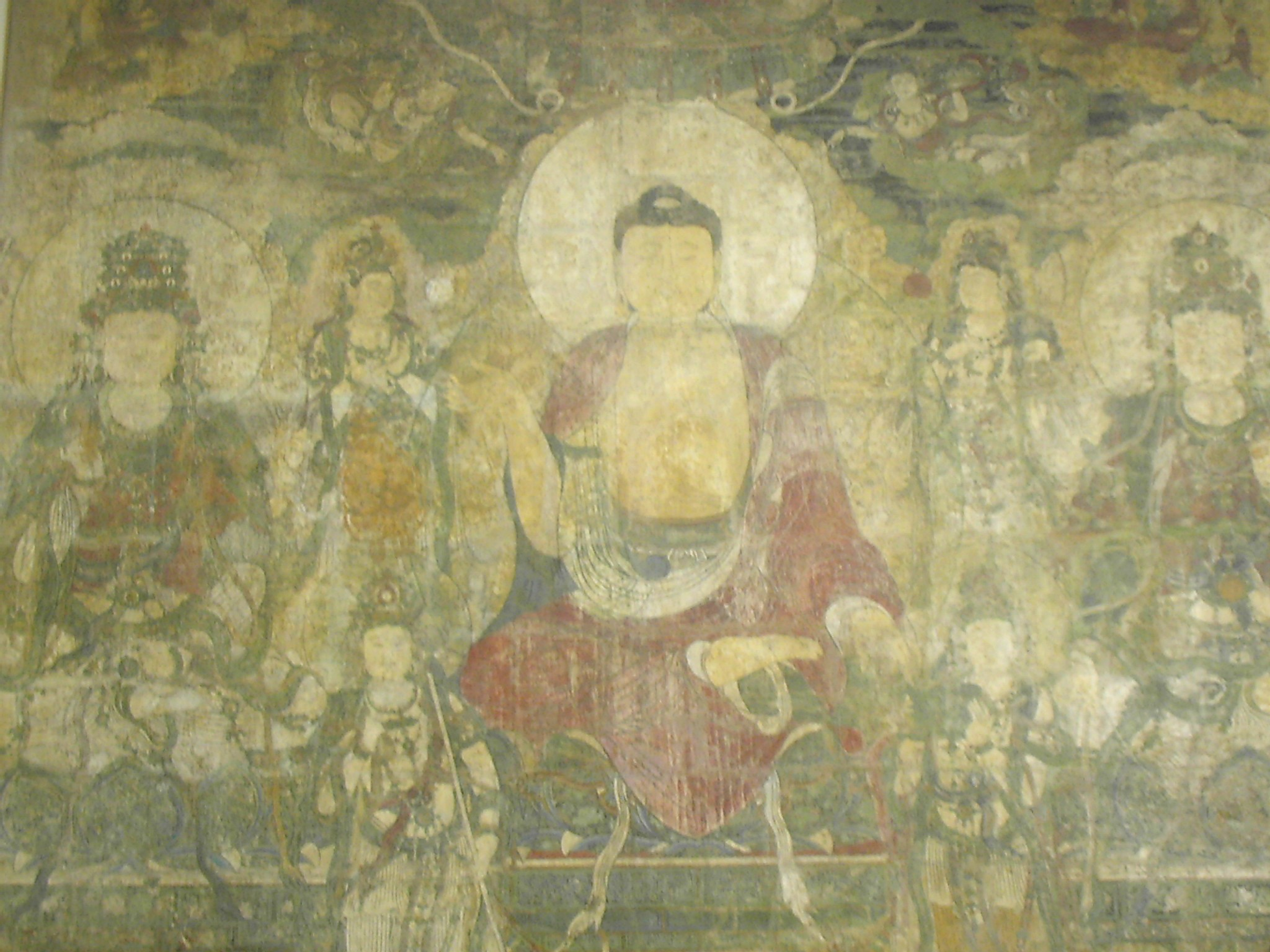
Mural as displayed in the Metropolitan Museum of Art

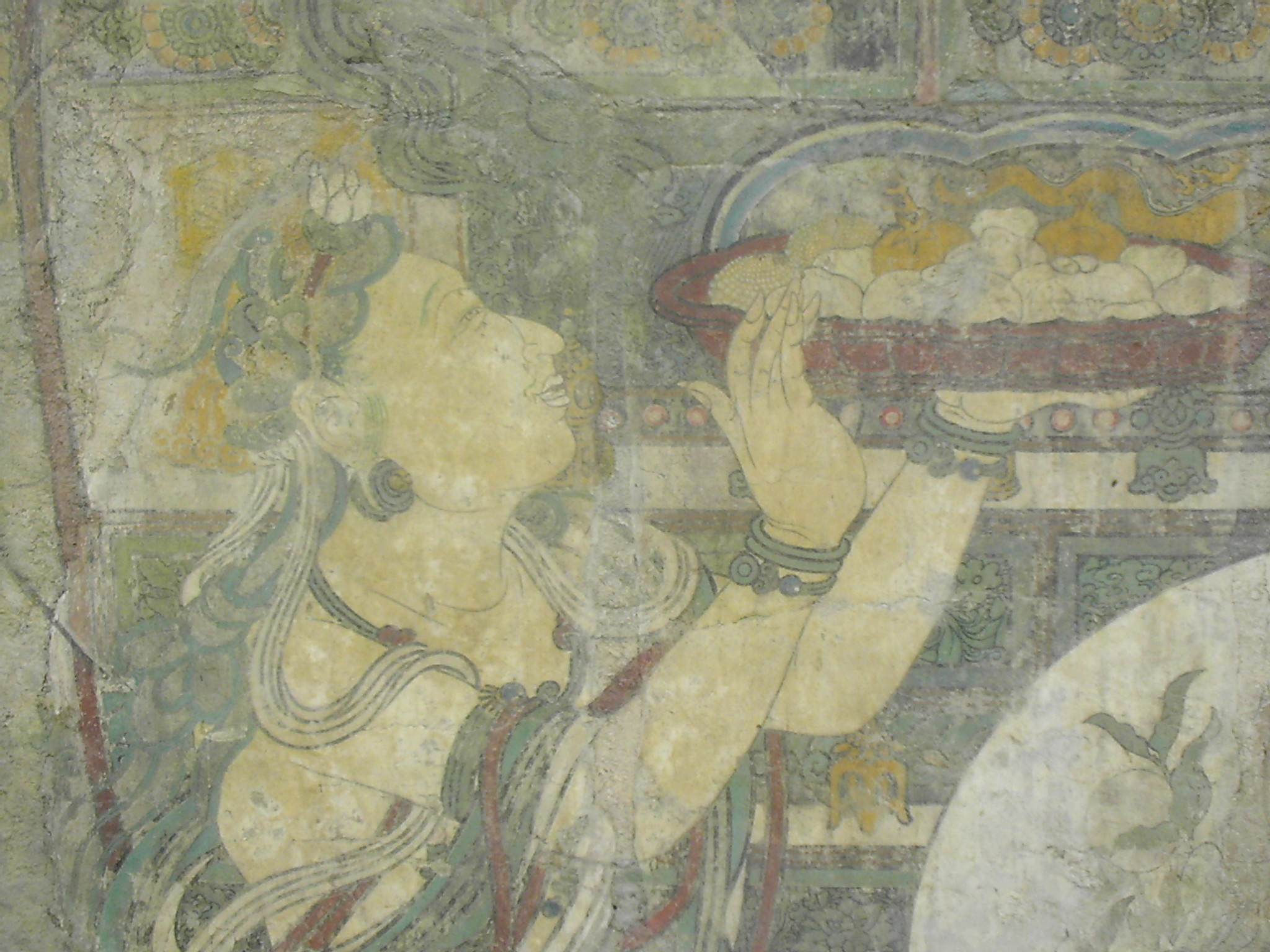
detail of the painting

As it stands today, the wall painting measures 751.8 cm in height and 1511.3 cm in length. It is notable for its high level of detail. The painting features the seated Bhaisajyaguru Buddha in an imagined heaven, surrounded by Bodhisattvas and gods. Usually, Bhaisajyaguru Buddha is depicted as an Indian figure. But in this Paradise of Bhaisajyaguru painting, all the figures are depicted with Chinese dresses and robes. Bhaisajyaguru Buddha is wearing a red robe. Buddha is flanked by two seated Bodhisattvas: Avalokitesvara and Cintamanicakra. Another four secondary Bodhisattva figures can be seen in the mural. The Twelve Heavenly Generals, six at each side in the painting symbolizes the Buddha's vow to help others. This painting was formerly confused as the Assembly of Śākyamuni Buddha.

Saptatathāgatapūrvapranidhānavisēsa Sūtra, a Buddhist sutta translated by Yi Jing (635-713), mentions that there were six predecessor Buddhas before Bhaisajyaguru. Small six Buddha images can be seen in the upper part of the painting. The central figure of Bhaisajyaguru Buddha is holding a bowl in his left hand symbolizing medicine. Bhaisajyaguru is considered as a Buddha of salvation and preventer of disasters in Mahayana Buddhism. Other important figures in the painting are the Bodhisattvas, Candraprabha and Suryaprabha. Candraprabha is the Bodhisattva who is holding a moon disk near Buddha's right hand. Suryaprabha is holding a sun disk with a red bird in it near Buddha's left hand.

== Creation ==
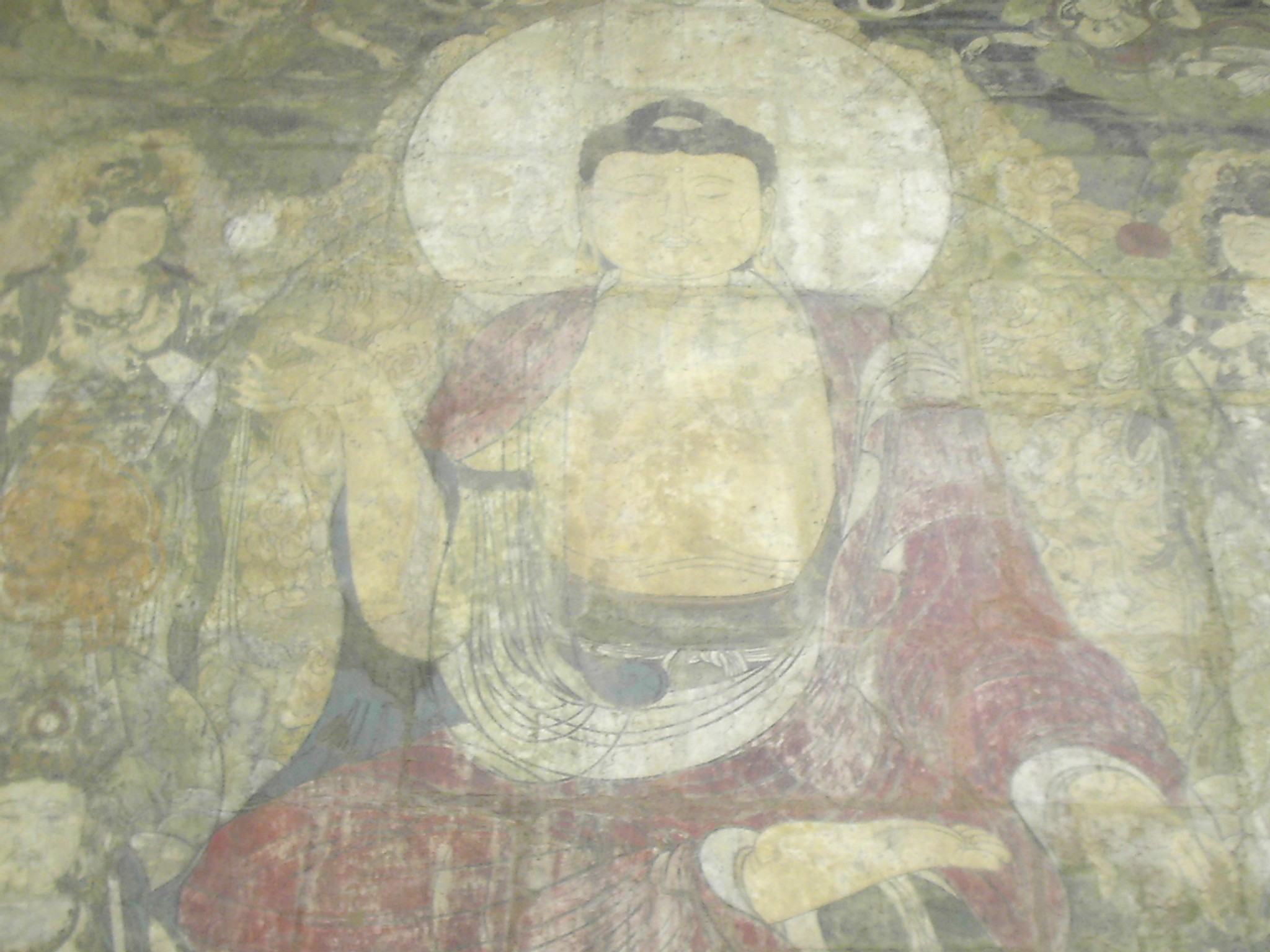
Bhaisajyaguru Buddha, details

The artist of this painting has not been identified. The robust and full-faced figures are characteristic of the paintings of Zhu Haogu (朱好古), who engaged in Buddhist and Daoist imagery in the fourteenth century. The painting, which was at the front hall of Guangsheng Lower Monastery, belongs to China's Yuan dynasty period. It may have been created circa 1319 AD. To prepare the monastery wall for this painting, it was covered with a foundation of clay mixed with straw. Then it was painted using a water-based pigment.

== Movement ==
During the 1920s, monks had sold the murals which were on the gable walls of the front hall of Guangsheng Lower Monastery to find funds for the renovations of the temple. These murals were acquired by three museums in the United States. Between 1926 and 1929 two of the paintings were housed at the University Museum of Pennsylvania University and one painting was acquired by the Nelson-Atkins Art Gallery, Kansas in 1932. Another painting was purchased by Arthur M. Sackler and was given to Metropolitan Museum of Art in 1964. This version of the painting was later known as the Paradise of Bhaisajyaguru.

== See also ==
- Paradise of Maitreya
