= William White (bishop of Honan) =

Canadian Anglican bishop and academic

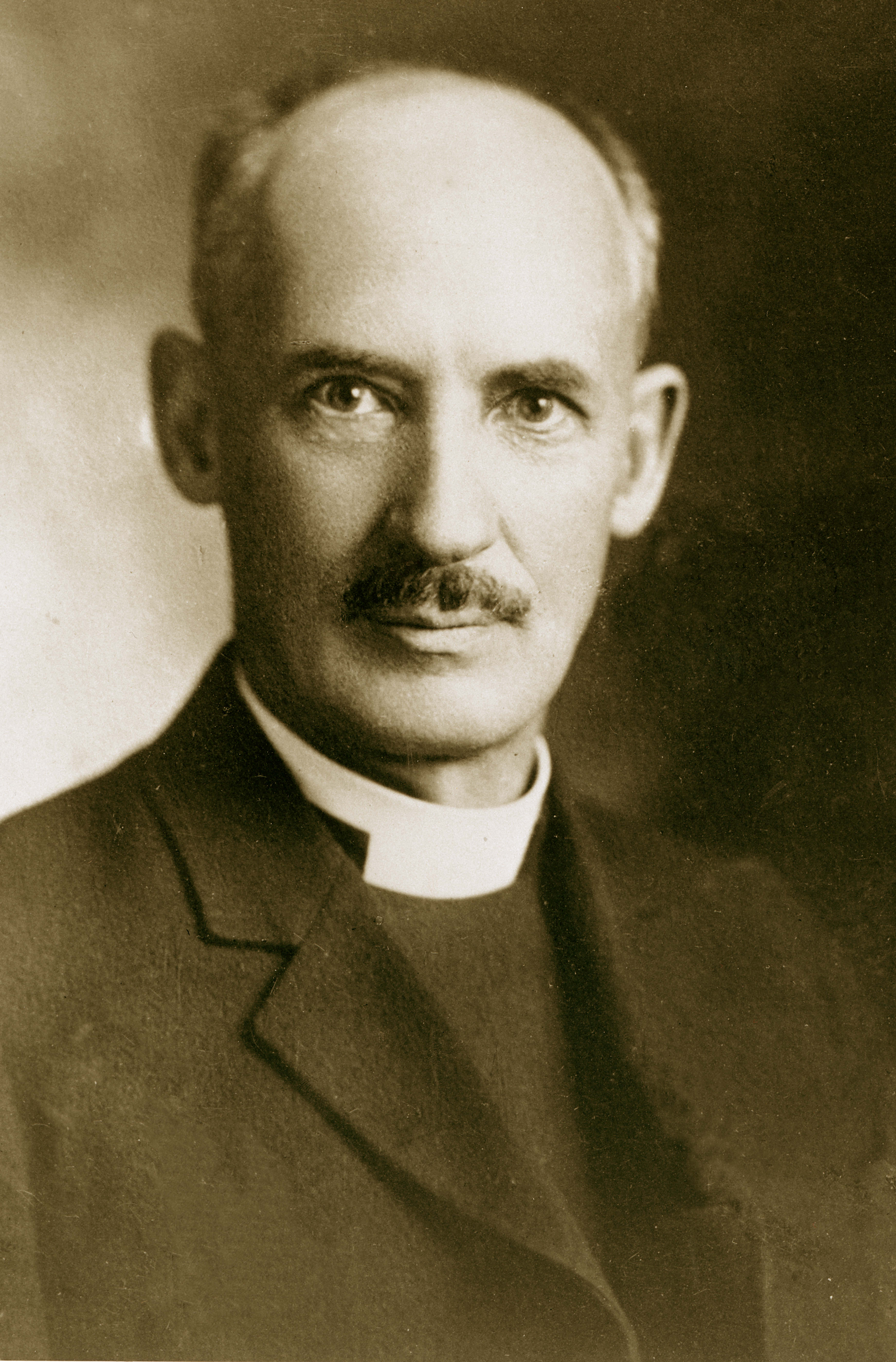
Portrait of Bishop White, c. 1920

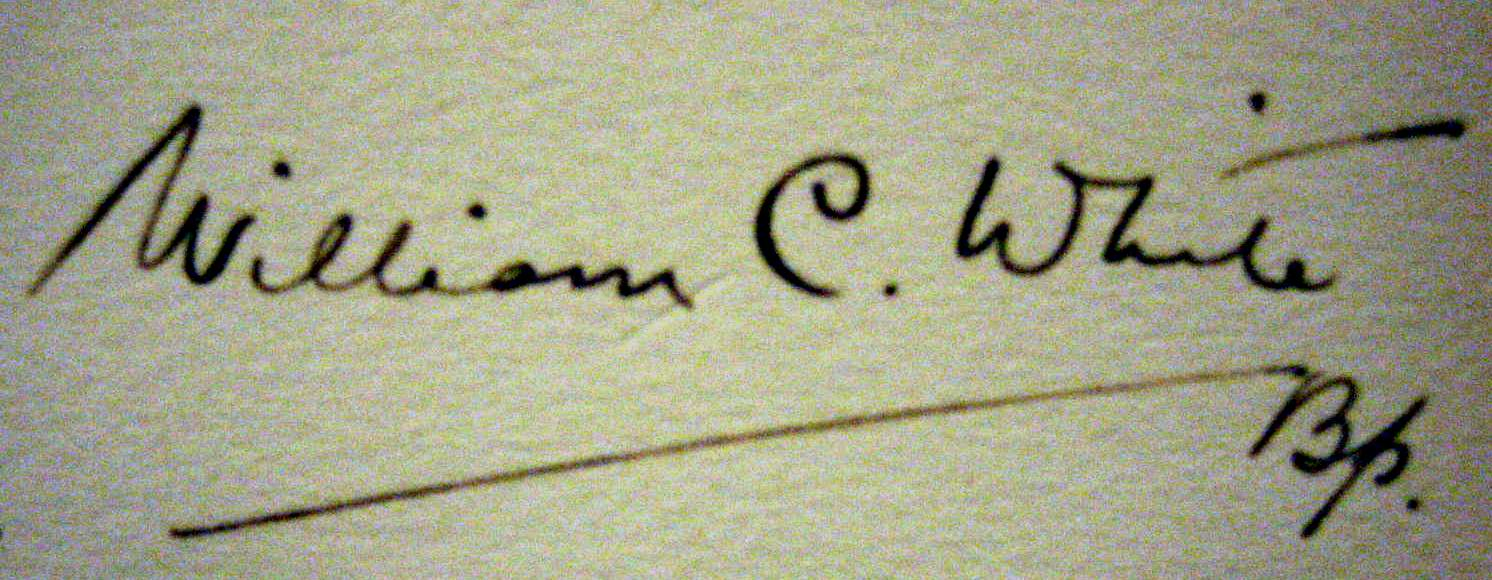

William Charles White FRSC (22 August 1873 – 24 January 1960) was an Anglican missionary bishop to China and later an academic specializing in Chinese study. (Note: Amongst others he wrote "Tombs of Old Lo-yang", 1934; "Tomb Tile Pictures of Ancient China", 1938; "Chinese Temple Frescoes", 1940; " Bone Culture of Ancient China", 1945; and "Bronze Culture of Ancient China", 1955.) He was the first bishop of Henan (then romanized as Honan). In addition to his missionary work he was a great collector of Chinese artifacts. A majority of his collection are the foundation for the Chinese collections at the Royal Ontario Museum in Toronto, Canada.

== Early life ==
William C. White was born in Devonshire, England, August 22, 1873. Little is known about his early childhood in England. He was known as Will in his early years, and was an outgoing child with dark hair and bright blue eyes. In 1880, his father emigrated to Canada in search of a more stable future for his family. In 1881, Will White, his mother and siblings, sailed to the new world and met their father in Norwood, Ontario. Will attended the public school and assisted his father in the labors (his father was a mason and contractor by trade). Norwood was a booming town and boasted a number of churches, stores and sports teams. Norwood would be a place of comparison for White the rest of his life, as he recognized the importance each building and group of people played in his life.

White's boundless energy and an interest in improving the lives of children, moved him to first to Kingston, Ontario where he began a career with the YMCA and later to Ottawa (around 1892). He eventually rose to the position of administrator at the YMCA which proved an excellent training ground for his future career as a missionary. At the YMCA he was in charge of planning meetings, conferences and public programing, soliciting funds and meeting with influential people, in an effort to share the mission of the YMCA with the greater community.

In his spare time he was enraptured by the developments in photography. He would spend a number of hours a week taking pictures and developing his own negatives. Unfortunately, his superiors at the YMCA suggested he do something more productive with his time. He put away his camera (but only temporarily as he would find use for it again in China). His next interest centered around cycling. Bicycles were an easy mode of transportation at the turn of the twentieth century and White was ecstatic to spend hours biking through the countryside around Ottawa visiting families and soliciting donations for the YMCA. It may have been at one of these outings, or a meeting he hosted at the YMCA, that first piqued his interest in missionary work.

Initially, White wanted to join fellow missionaries in Africa. But his mother's refusal to support him held off his application until the end of 1893. At which point, the missionary program which White applied to collapsed under financial and political strains. He was saddened by the loss of opportunity, but continued on with his work in Ottawa. Soon another opportunity arose, this time in China. He was invited to go to China with the Stewart family, an establish missionary family in Fujian, but he declined as he felt he was not yet ready to leave Canada. This was a small blessing for White, as in 1895 the whole family was massacred in Fujian. It was at this point that White decided he was ready to embark on his missionary work, but felt his high school education inadequate for his career goals. After consulting with family and friends he enrolled in the Wycliffe College in Toronto.

== Education ==
Will White enrolled in Wycliffe College in the spring of 1894, where he studied religion, languages and other academic fields. While at Wycliffe, White attended many lectures and mission programs put on by fellow missionaries around the college campus. He attended a number of services, in many denominations, so as to broaden his understanding of religion and the Bible. He also participated in local missions in Toronto and would have a "square talk" to anyone who asked. Will White's "square talks" became infamous among people who worked with him during his years at college. He had the ability to turn any conversation towards religion, establish the listener's confidence in him, break down any resistance and relate intimate religious experiences through a matter of fact tone. His talks never embarrassed or created resentment among those who listened. More often than not, White inspired his listeners to embark on their own spiritual journey. Although his evangelism seemed to mellow as he aged, he never lost his passion for connecting people to a spiritual path. On May 31, 1896, William C. White was ordained deacon in St. Alban's Cathedral in Toronto. In October of the same year he was advised of his appointment to be the next missionary to China through the Missionary Society of Canada. In January 1897 he was advised to sail to China.

== Missionary to China ==
He was a Canadian Church Missionary in Fujian (Fukien) until 1909, however he was sent by the missionary society to survey areas throughout China. In 1909 he was recalled to Toronto and elevated to the rank of Bishop, at which point he returned to his work in China and became the first Bishop of Henan (Honan), a post he held for 25 years.

Once in China, White quickly learned local dialects, including Fujian dialect and slowly started to adopt the Chinese way of dress. Although his stature didn't fool anyone, he felt if he gave an effort to learn the language and dress in familiar garments, those around him would be more open to discussing church matters with him. In 1910 he arrived at his new headquarters in Kaifeng. His new station came with hefty responsibilities. Aware of his new station in the church, White pushed other people hard, as he had once been as a new missionary. During his tenure in Henan, White was responsible for the building of eleven churches, each with an ordained Chinese pastor. Although his primary focus was the building of the Anglican missions, he also made significant contributions to health programs, welfare and educational programs in local villages throughout Henan.

Starting with the 1911 Revolution, the world around Henan started to change. Although Bishop White seemed oblivious to it, he was probably aware of changing political scenes in the east, and west. After World War I, Bishop White felt he was nearing the end of his work. Although he had been collecting pieces of interest throughout his time in China, he turned his attention to collecting starting in the 1920s. By 1934, the church (including Bishop White) were being driven out of China by civil war and the Whites decided to return to Toronto.

== The Royal Ontario Museum ==
During White's time in China he learned a great deal of about Chinese art, religion, industry and traditional life. In 1924, while on leave in Toronto, White had a meeting with Charles T. Currelly, a charismatic archaeologist who had been charged with establishing a museum for the University of Toronto. This chance meeting and budding friendship lead to a decade long partnership in the pursuit of museum specimens.

Today a number of the items in the Asian Galleries and collections at the ROM reflect Bishop White's commitment to preserving specimens that were reflective of his time in China. Artifacts range from pottery to art work and textiles. As well as parts of structures that were sent to Currelly for reconstruction in the museum.

== Marriage and Family ==
In October 1897, Annie Ray, a fellow student and missionary with the Missionary Society of Canada, joined White in China. Prior to White's departure from Canada, they had hoped to be married, but forces kept them apart for most of 1897. They were married in Shanghai shortly after Annie arrived in China. The Whites were then sent to survey the province of Henan, one of the last provinces opened to the western world. The Whites had three children, Stewart, Gordon, and Mary. After the death of Annie, White's social and professional life became chaotic. By 1935 he had reestablished a connection with another missionary, Daisy Masters, and they were married in Quebec City later that year. Upon his return to Toronto, the Whites hoped to establish a home of refuge from the busy schedules of both Will and Daisy. They purchased a small cottage in Niagara-on-the-Lake where they would take weekend and summer respites from the city.

== Post Mission Work ==
Upon his permanent return to Toronto in 1935 until his retirement 1948, White was Professor of Chinese Studies at the University of Toronto. He died on 24 January 1960.

== Bibliography ==
- Dickson, Lovat. The Museum Makers: The Story of the Royal Ontario Museum. Toronto. The Bryant Press. 1986. Print.
- Taylor, Charles Six Journeys: a Canadian Pattern: Brigadier James Sutherland Brown, Bishop William White, James Houston, Herbert Norman, Emily Carr, Scott Symons. Toronto: Anansi, 1977
- Walmsley, Lewis C. Bishop in Honan: Mission and Museum in the Life of William C. White. Toronto: University of Toronto Press, 1974. Print.
