= Imperial Palace Hall Reconstruction =

Scale model of 17th-century Chinese hall

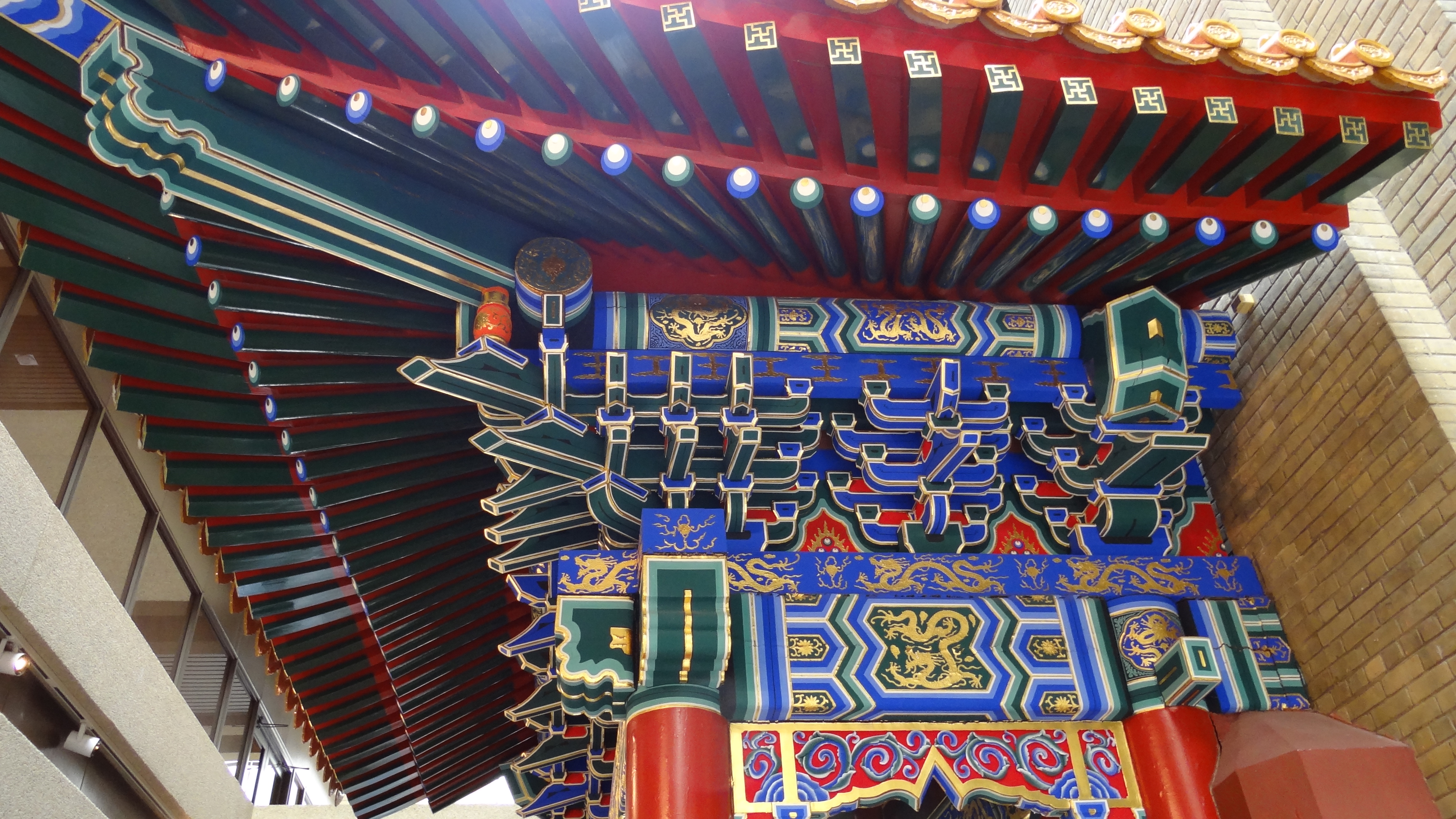
The Imperial Palace Hall Reconstruction at the Royal Ontario Museum

The Imperial Palace Hall Reconstruction in the Royal Ontario Museum is a full-scale model of a section of a 17th-century Chinese Imperial Palace building in Beijing’s Forbidden City. The hall was built in 2005 at the Beijing Ancient Architecture Museum in Beijing and transported in pieces to the museum in Toronto where it was reconstructed in the Gallery. This object is a center piece to the Chinese Galleries and is used by many to illustrate to the detailed work of craftsmen during the Qing Dynasty (1644-1912).

== Chinese architecture ==
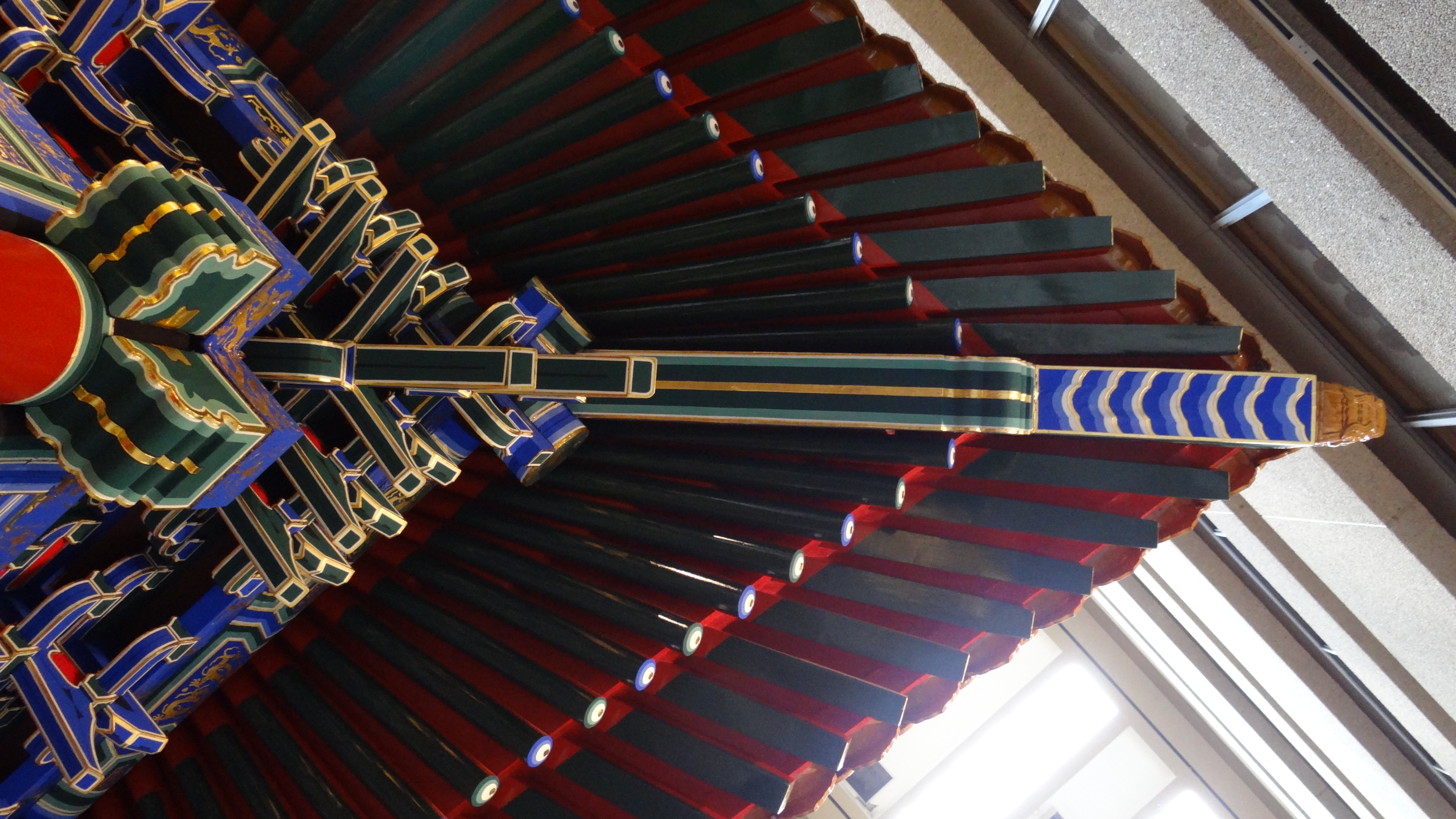
Underside of roof overhang of the Imperial Palace reconstruction at the Royal Ontario Museum

The bright colors, carvings and terra cotta tiles are all reflective of the Qing Dynasty. The architecture of this time period is filled with symbolism, as with most eras in Chinese architecture. Traditionally, wooden buildings were a place for the living to use while stone construction was used to house the dead (see ROM's Ming Tomb). The hall was built using the traditional methods and materials of Ancient Chinese wooden architecture. The original palace is 5 bays wide and 4 bays deep. A "bay" is the space between each large support column. This unique construction allows for the columns to support the weight of the roof without the need for any load bearing walls.

Architectural features of note are the dougong, which are the brightly painted bracket clusters supporting the tile roof, which were carved using traditional methods. The glazed roof tiles and dragon figures are representative of temple decoration.

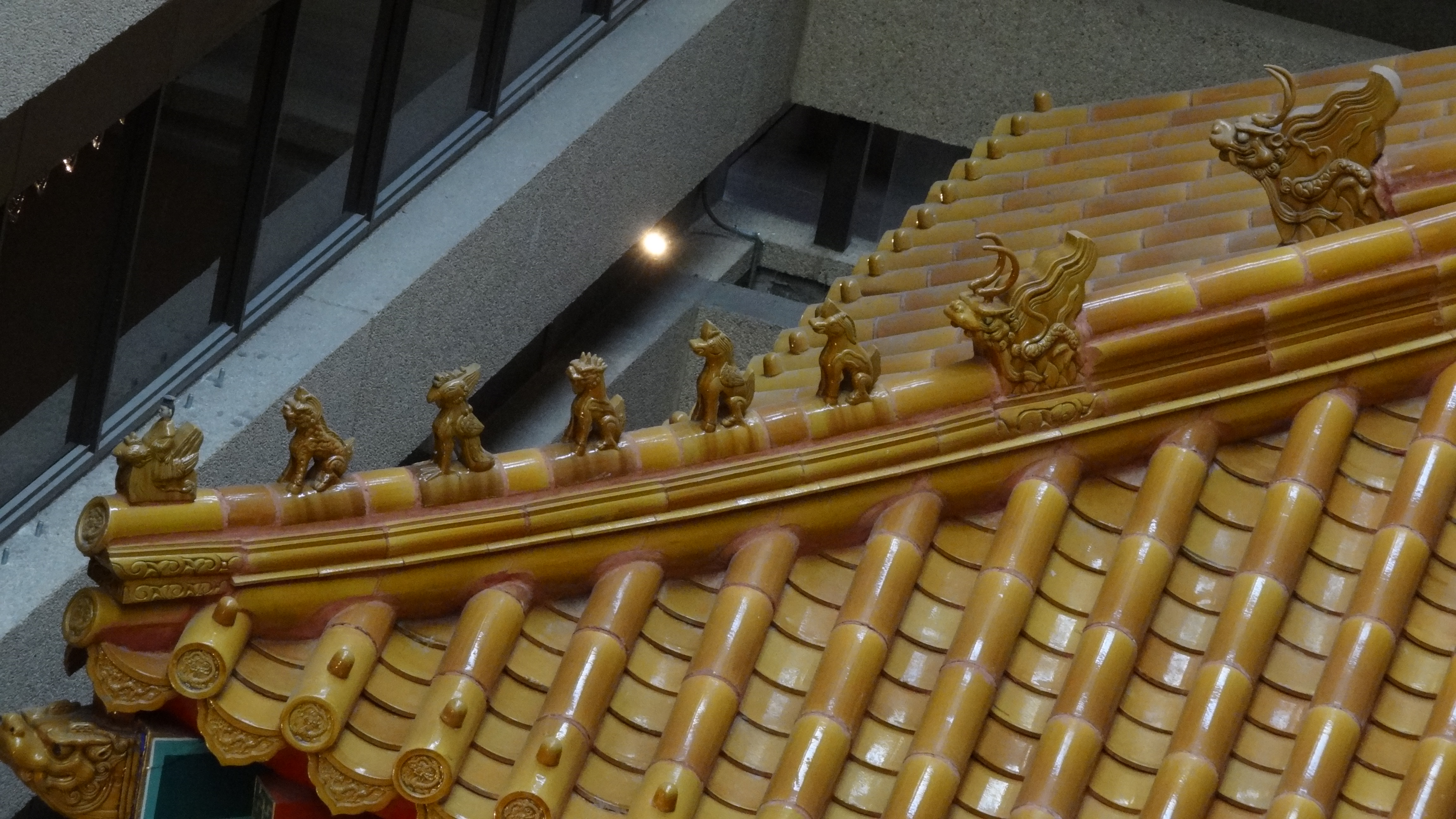
Roof Tiles and figures on the Imperial Palace Reconstruction at the Royal Ontario Museum

== Bibliography ==
- Steinhardt, Nancy Shatzman (1984). Chinese traditional architecture. New York: China Institute in America.
