= Tomb of General Zu Dashou =

Chinese object in the Royal Ontario Museum in Canada

Coordinates: 43°40′03″N 79°23′39″W

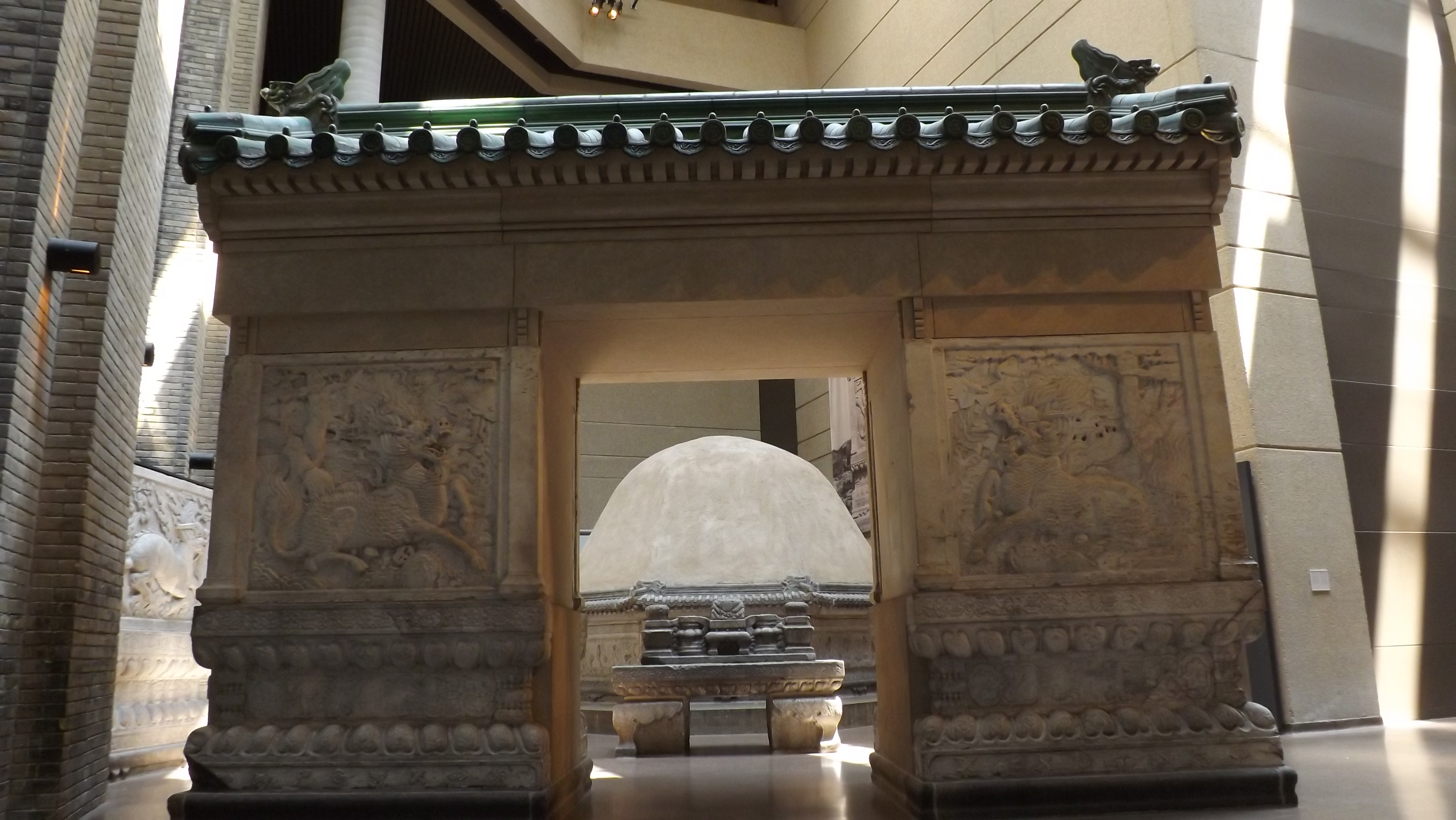
Archway and burial mound through arch, Royal Ontario Museum

The Tomb of General Zu Dashou (also known as the "Ming Tomb") is one of the earliest pieces in the Royal Ontario Museum’s collections, and on the museum's list of Iconic Objects.

== History ==
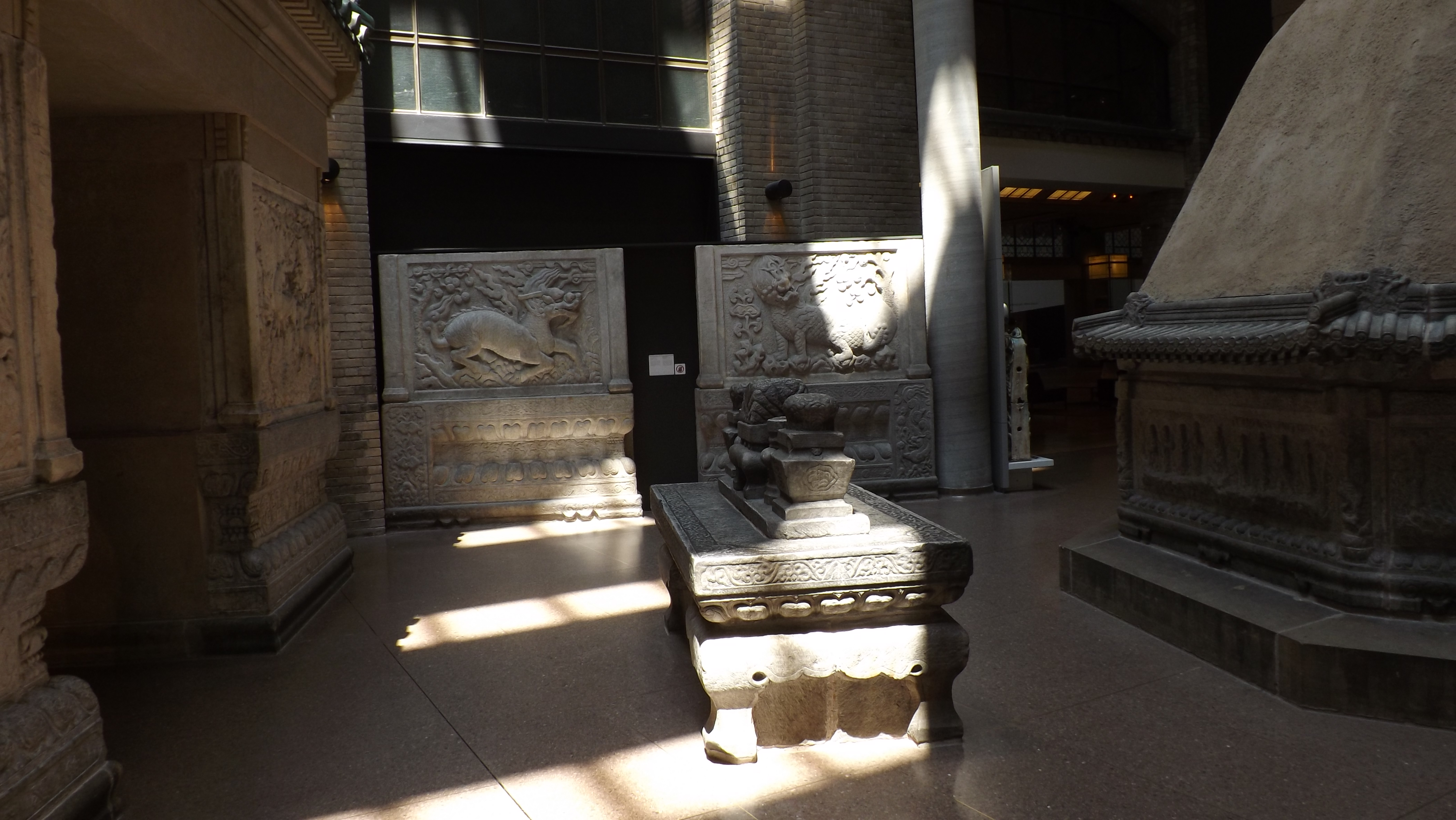
Wall carvings and courtyard of the Ming Tomb exhibit, Royal Ontario Museum

Zu Dashou (died 1656) was a general of the late Ming dynasty whose bravery as a defender of the dynasty against the Manchus earned him an esteemed place in Chinese history. In 1631, the general gave the enemy army one of his loyal sons as a hostage in hopes to speed up negotiations and relieve the people of Dalinghe of constant warfare. By the time the Ming dynasty fell in 1644, Zu Dashou and a number of his sons had switched loyalties and served the new Qing dynasty.

In 1656, the general died and construction on his tomb began. The scale of the tomb is an indication of the respect and esteem General Zu held even amongst his former enemies.

In the early 20th century, Charles T. Currelly, the managing director of the museum at the time, was offered a chance to purchase a number of Chinese artifacts George Crofts, a wealthy British merchant who was trading in the Chinese fur business, sought for and collected.

In 1921, the tomb and the associated artifacts arrived at the museum and became a focal point of the collection. Originally there was little provenance (or history) relating the artifacts to their long history and it was only suspected that this tomb belonged to General Zu. Research into the tomb and its history has continued over the decades. In 2005, curator Klaas Ruitenbeek's research confirmed that the tomb was originally built for and contained the remains of General Zu Dashou and his three wives.

Today, the altar, stone burial mound, archway and other artifacts are arranged to replicate the burial area as it was found in Yongtai Village (near Beijing) in 1919. Other tombs in the complex suggest that this tomb was part of a family burial plot, as a number of his sons were buried nearby.

== Imagery ==
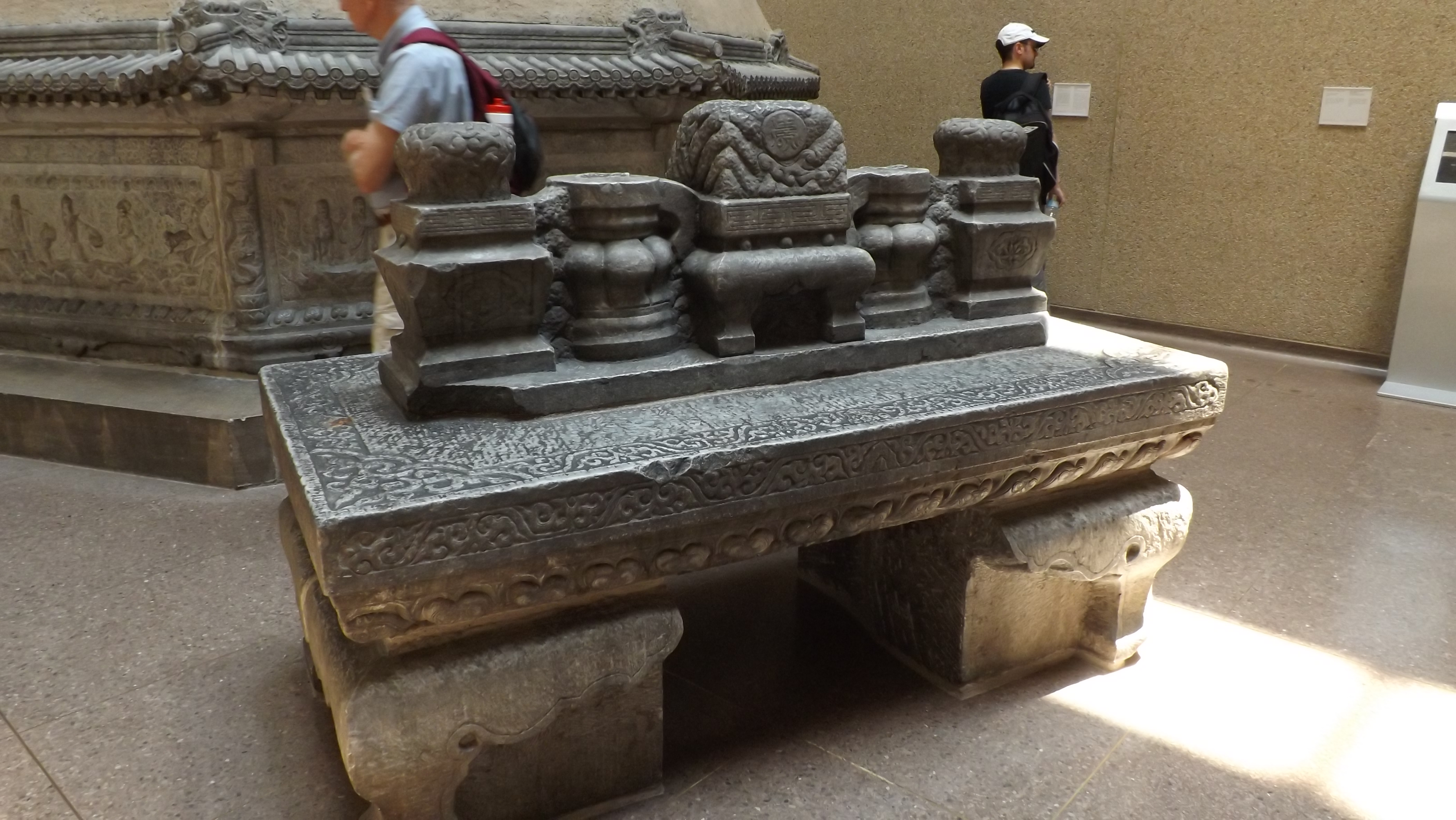
Ming Tomb altar, Royal Ontario Museum

The tomb complex is full of imagery representing good fortune and immortality. Like many cultures across the world, burial imagery acts as a charm for those crossing to an after life as well as serving as a visual reminder of the departed, and their good deeds, to those who remained. Family members would make offerings to their ancestors, including General Zu, several times a year. Most of these offerings included ceramic tomb gifts.

Symbols in the tomb complex include:

- Deer is the symbol for longevity
- Monkeys near the bees nest is a pun for high rank.
- Qilin are mystical animals (many of the carvings represent qilin)

Other images include dragons, bamboo, and lotus flowers.

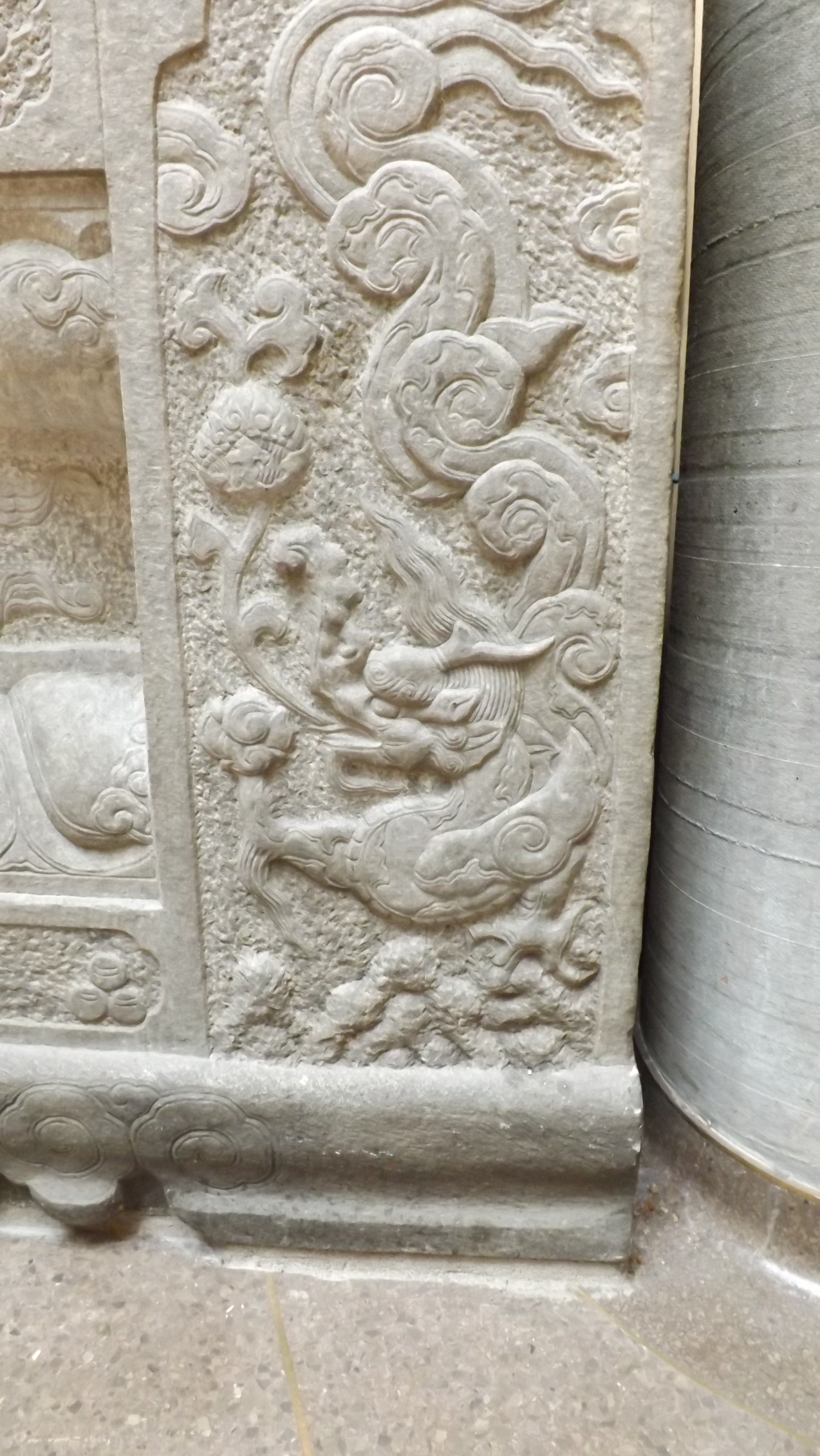
Ming Tomb archway, Royal Ontario Museum

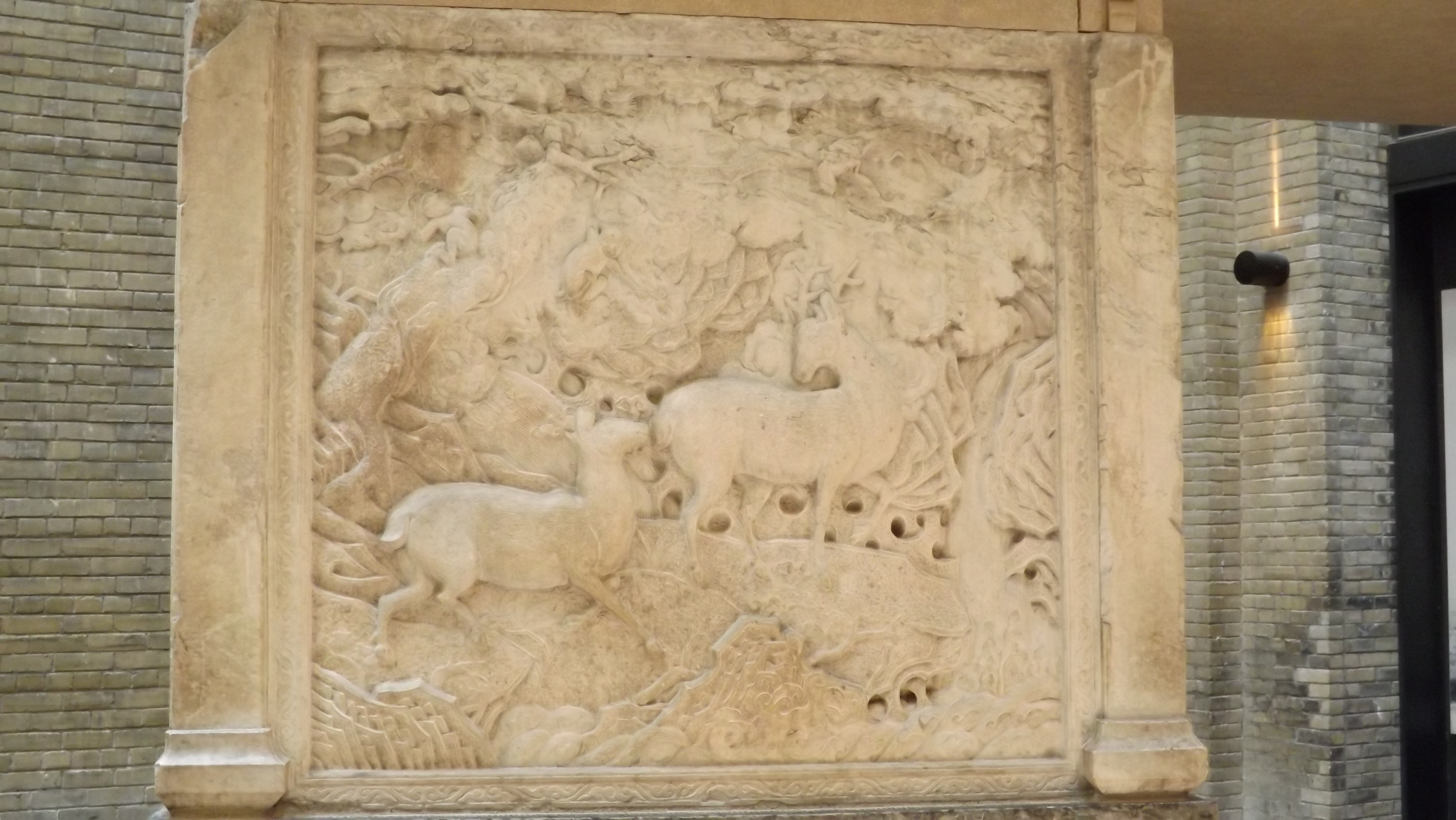
Archway, view from burial mound, Royal Ontario Museum

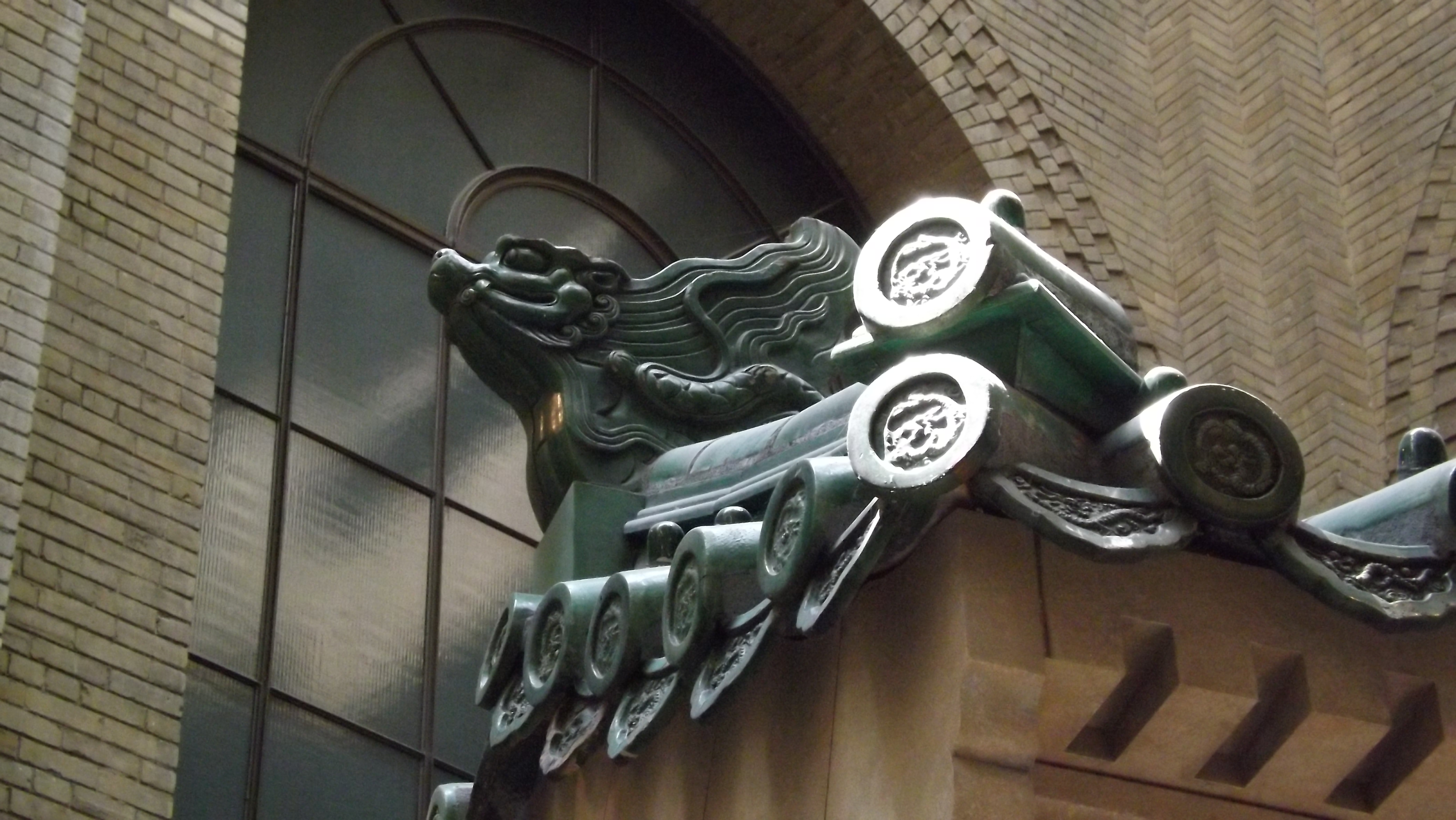
Archway, view from burial mound, Royal Ontario Museum

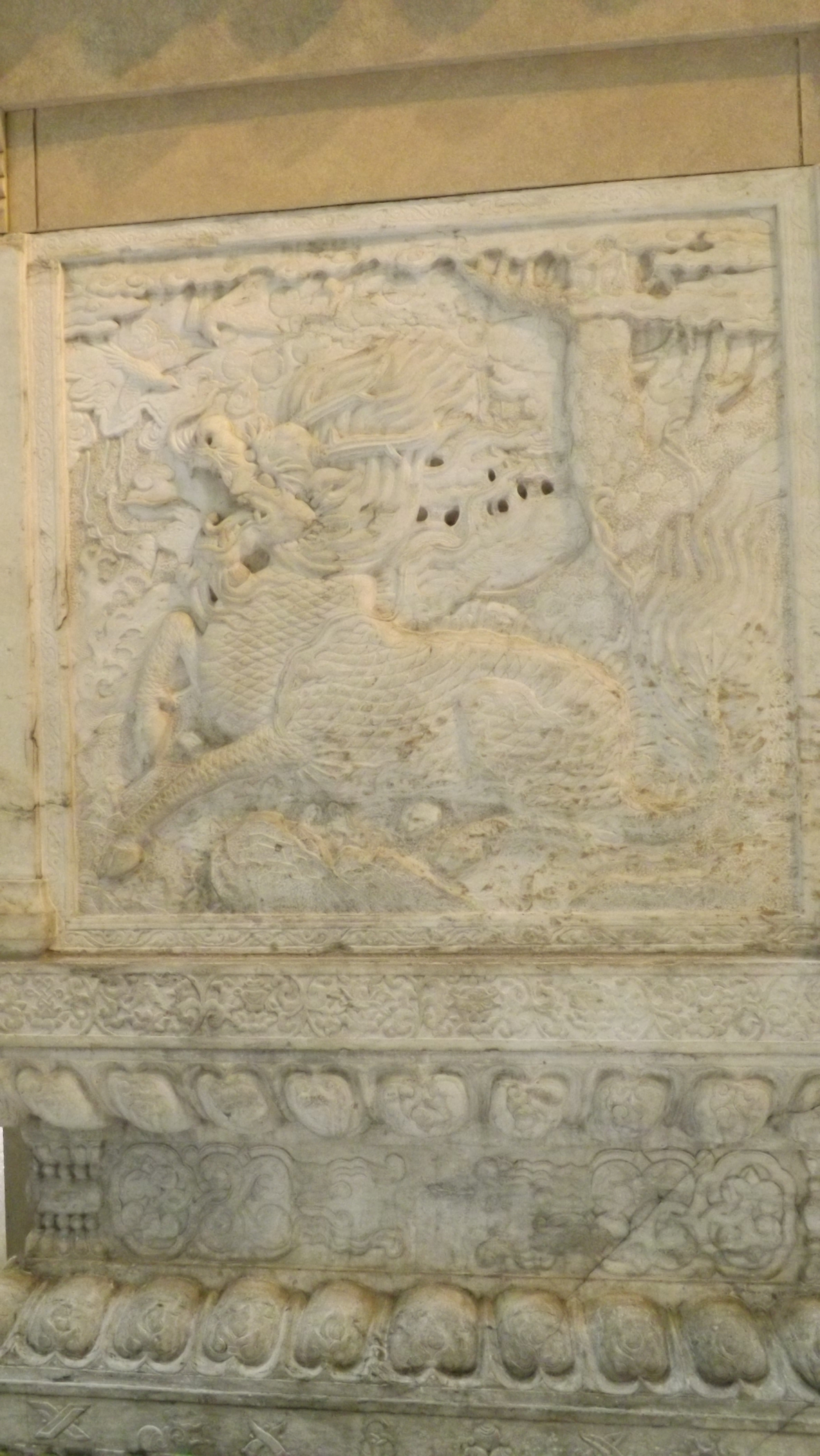
Wall carvings, Royal Ontario Museum

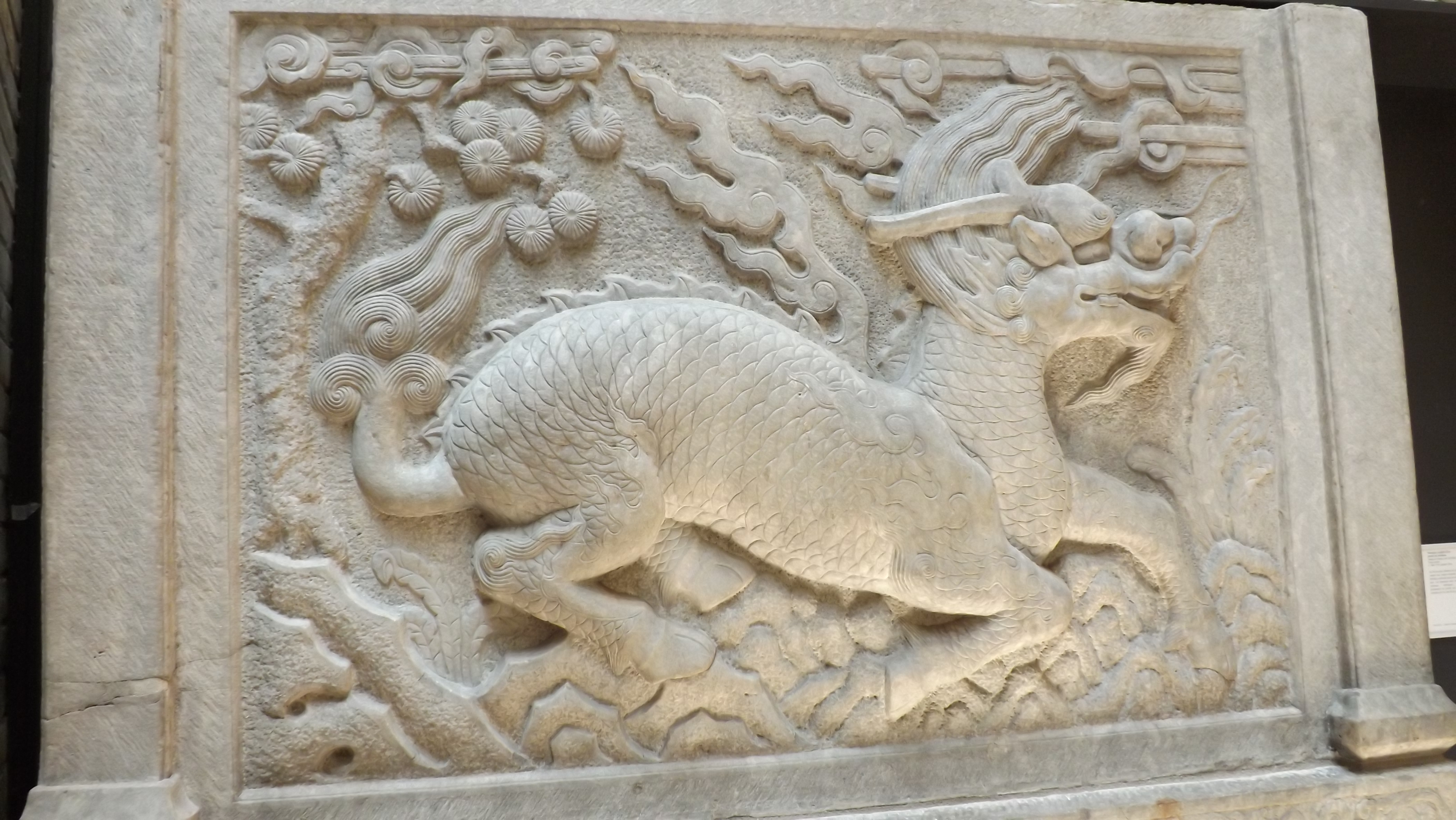
Ming Tomb exhibit, Royal Ontario Museum

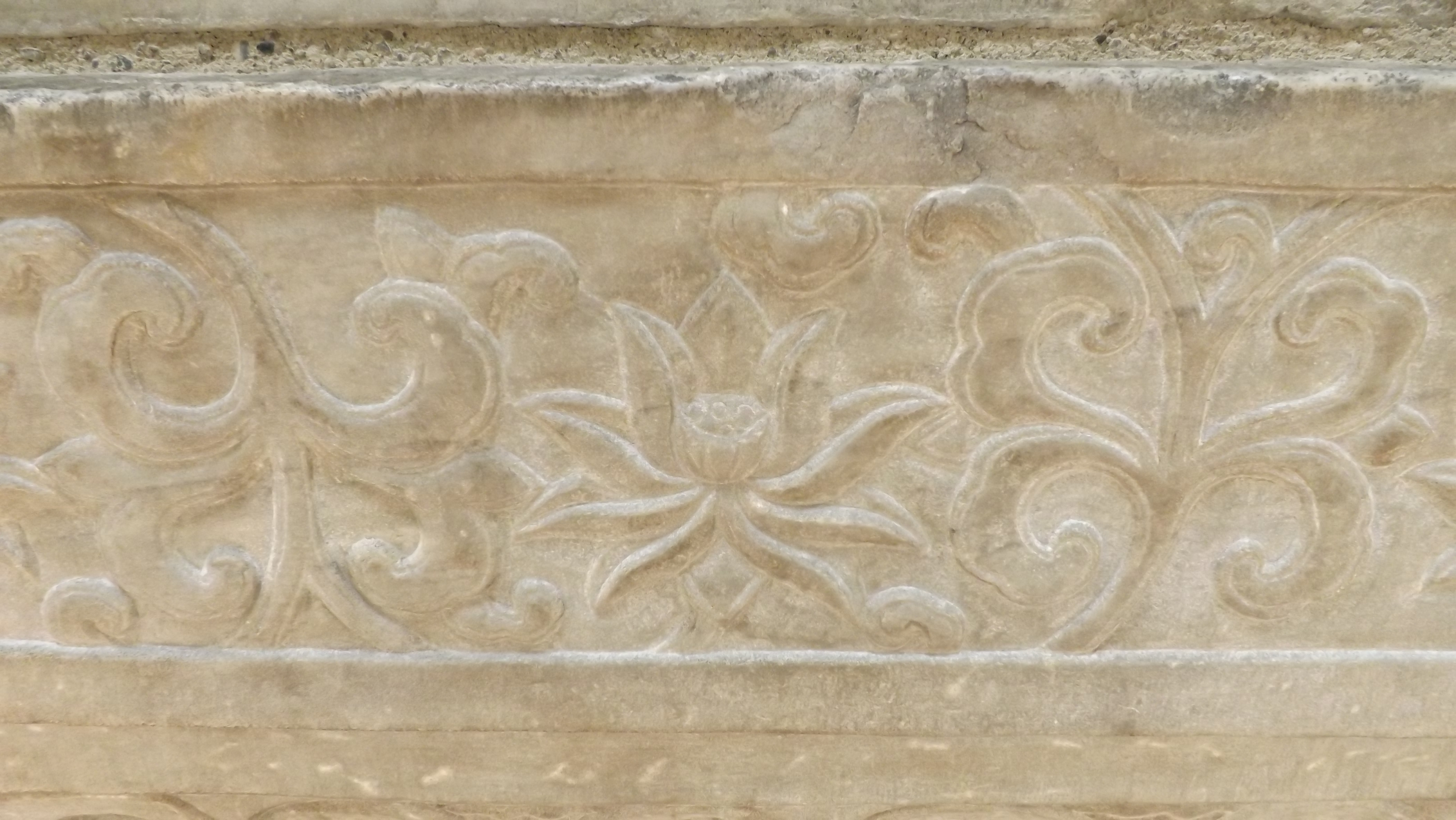
Archway carving, Royal Ontario Museum

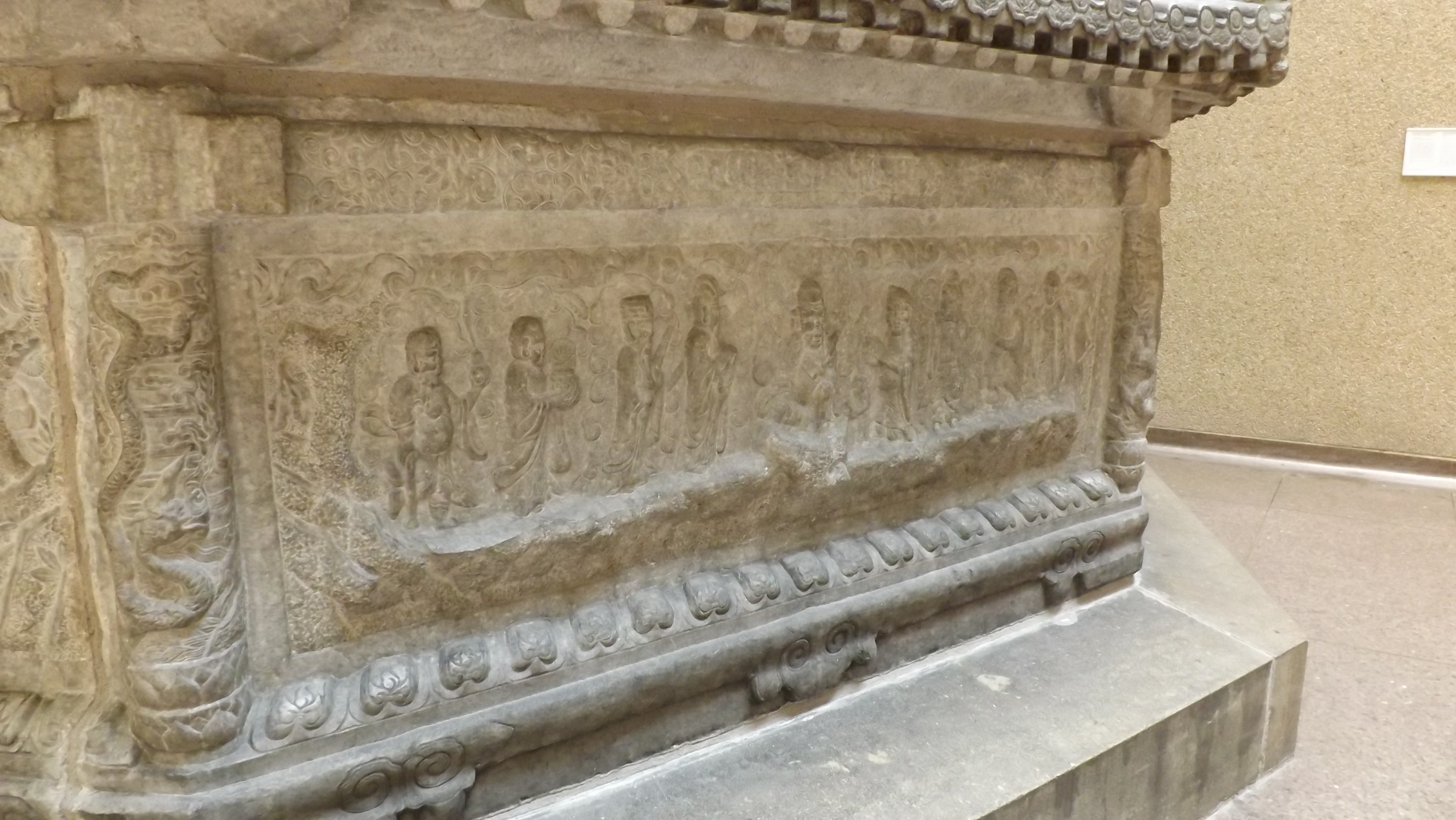
Tomb base, Royal Ontario Museum

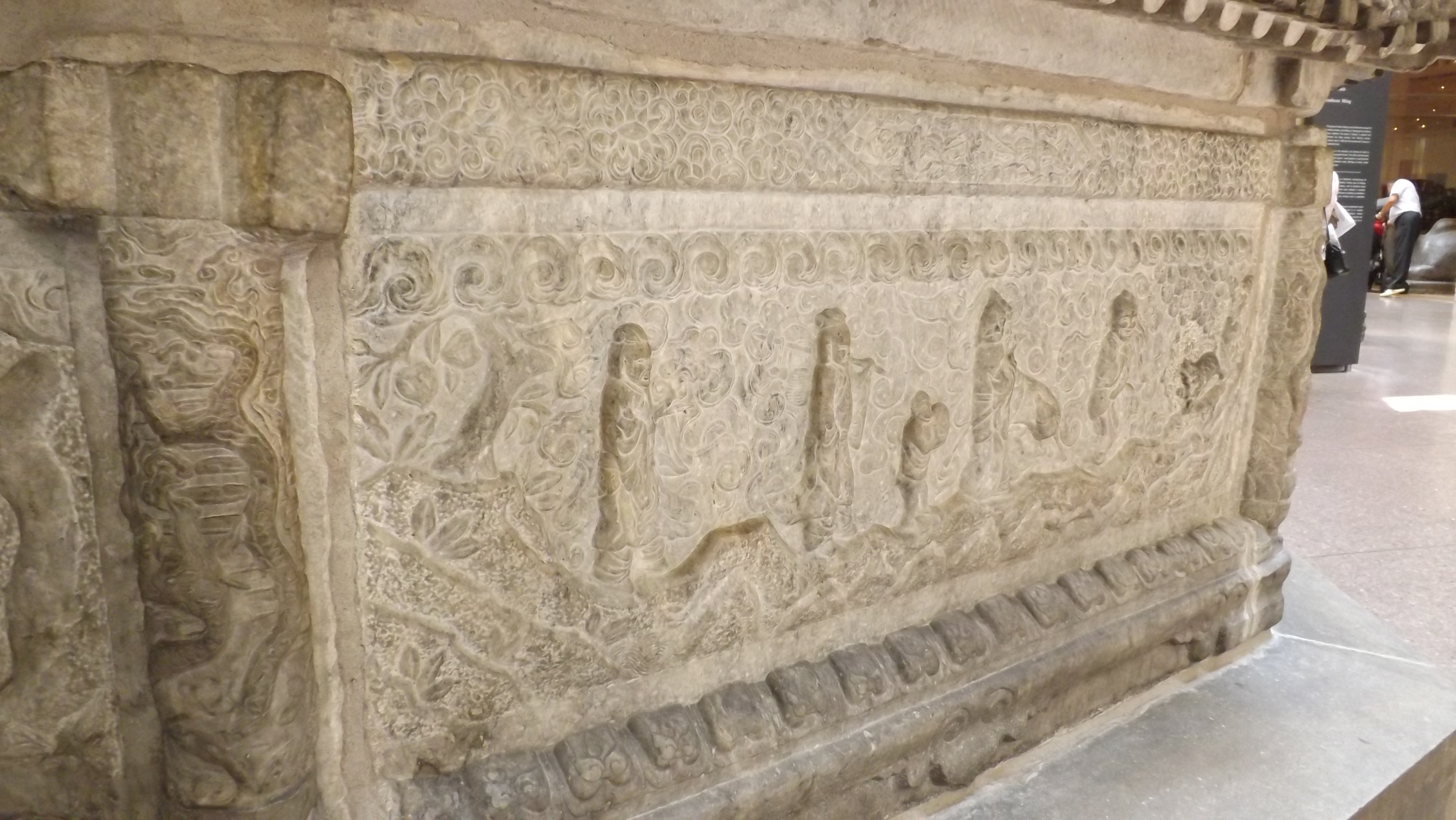
Tomb base, Royal Ontario Museum
